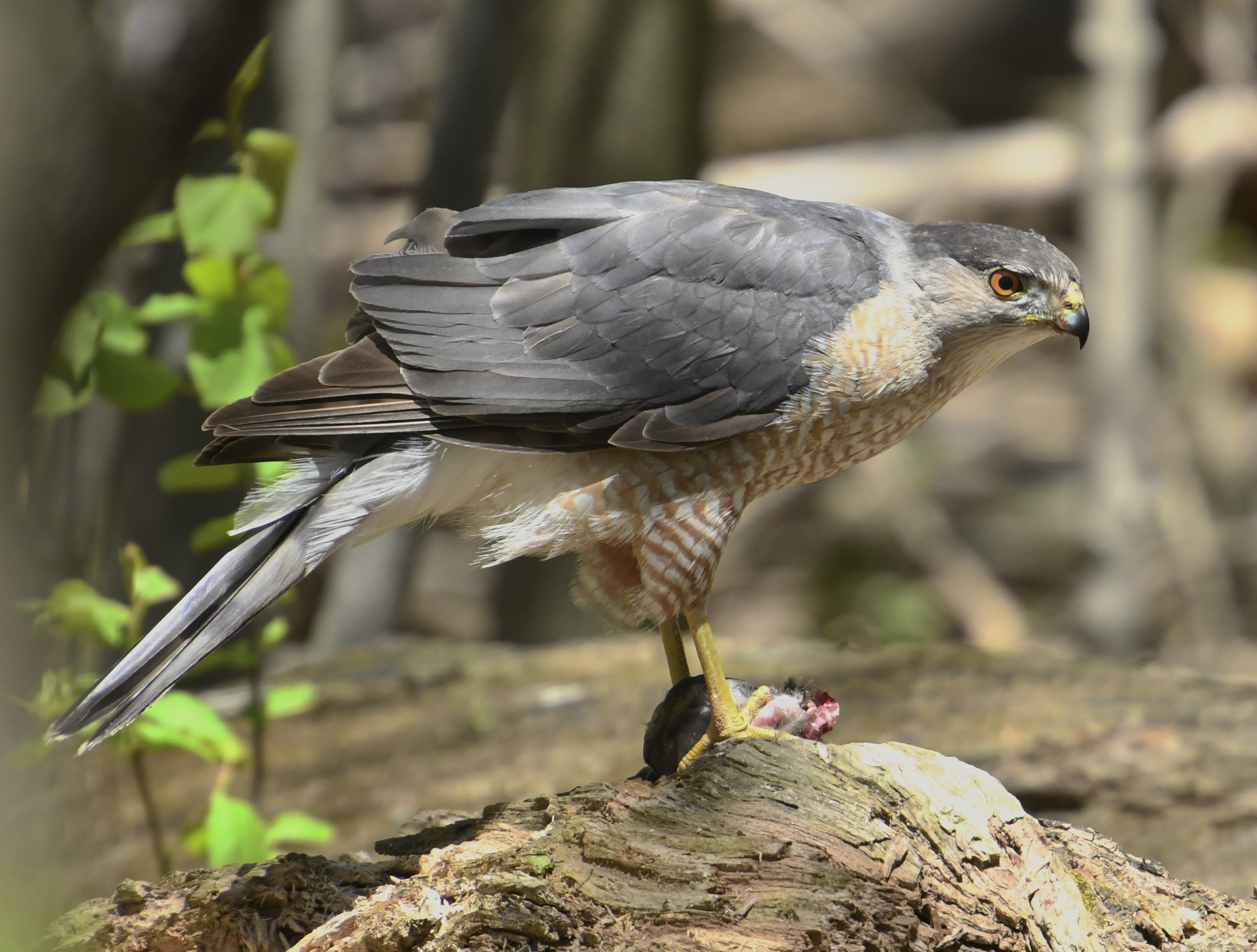
- adult
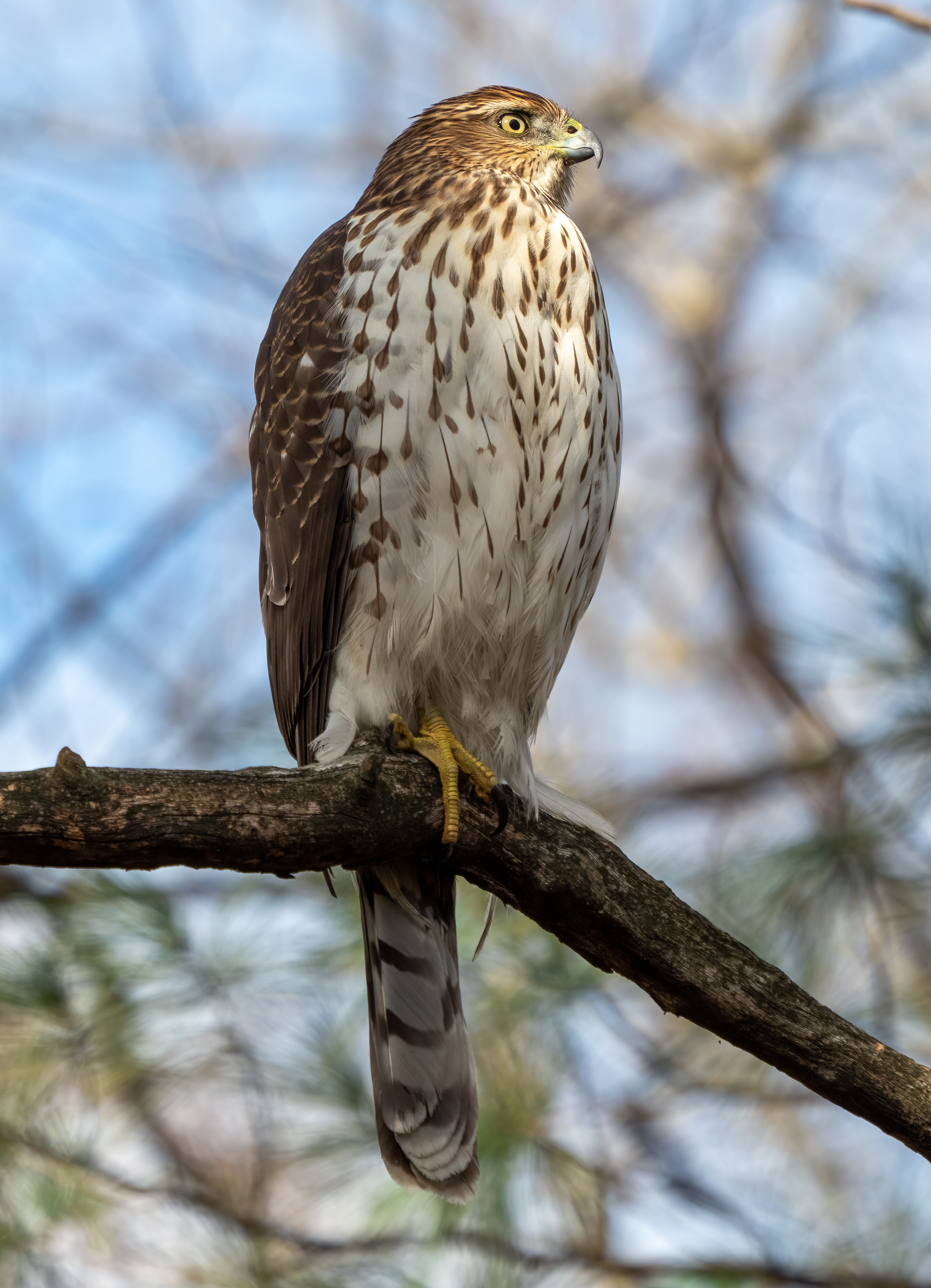
- juvenile

Conservation status
- Least Concern (IUCN 3.1)

Scientific classification
- Kingdom: Animalia
- Phylum: Chordata
- Class: Aves
- Order: Accipitriformes
- Family: Accipitridae
- Genus: Astur
- Species: A. cooperii

Binomial name
- Astur cooperii (Bonaparte, 1828)
- Breeding Year-round Non-breeding

= Cooper's hawk =

Species of bird

Cooper's hawk (Astur cooperii) is a medium-sized hawk native to the North American continent and found from southern Canada to Mexico. This species was formerly placed in the genus Accipiter.

As in many birds of prey, the male is smaller than the female. The birds found east of the Mississippi River tend to be larger on average than the birds found to the west. It is easily confused with the smaller but similar sharp-shinned hawk (Accipiter striatus).

The species was named in 1828 by Charles Lucien Bonaparte in honor of his friend and fellow ornithologist, William Cooper. Other common names for Cooper's hawk include: big blue darter, chicken hawk, flying cross, hen hawk, quail hawk, striker, and swift hawk. Many of the names applied to Cooper's hawks refer to their ability to hunt large and evasive prey using extremely well-developed agility.

This species primarily hunts small to medium-sized birds, but also commonly takes small mammals and sometimes reptiles.

Like most related hawks, Cooper's hawks prefer to nest in tall trees with extensive canopy cover and can commonly produce up to two to four fledglings depending on conditions.

Breeding attempts may be compromised by poor weather, predators, and anthropogenic causes, in particular the use of industrial pesticides and other chemical pollution in the 20th century. Despite historic declines due to anthropogenic causes, the bird's population is increasing as of 2024.

== Taxonomy ==
Video: Astur cooperii

Cooper's hawk was formally described by the French naturalist Charles Lucien Bonaparte in 1828 from a specimen collected near Bordentown, New Jersey. Bonaparte later coined the binomial name, Falco cooperii. The specific epithet and the common name were chosen to honor naturalist William Cooper, one of the founders of the New York Lyceum of Natural History (later the New York Academy of Sciences) in New York City. Other common names include Big Blue Darter, and the Chickenhawk.

Cooper's hawk was formerly placed in the genus Accipiter. In 2024, a comprehensive molecular phylogenetic study of the family Accipitridae confirmed that the genus was polyphyletic. To resolve the non-monophyly, Accipiter was divided into six separate genera. The genus, Astur, was introduced in 1828 by French naturalist Charles Lucien Bonaparte alongside the Eurasian goshawk (Astur gentilis), which was later designated as the type species. The genus was then resurrected to accommodate the Cooper's Hawk, alongside eight other species previously placed in Accipiter.

Apparently, Cooper's hawk was the earliest Astur known to colonize North America with a well-defined fossil record dating back perhaps 0.5-1 million years (the goshawk came second). Despite the considerably wider range of the Sharp-Shinned Hawk, still considered as Accipiter, the ancestors of the Sharp-Shinned Hawk was the last to arrive via the Bering Land Bridge. Further genetic testing has indicated the Cooper's Hawk is more closely related to the American Goshawk, despite the several superficial characteristics Cooper's Hawks may share with the Sharp-Shinned Hawks, the species of which finding a close relative in the Eurasian sparrowhawk. Any characterics shared by the two species were most likely obtained through convergent evolution.

In 2014, a naturally-occur hybrid between a Cooper's Hawk and an Northern Goshawk was captured in Cape May. Using data gathered from mitochondrial and nuclear genes, it was confirmed that the hybrids was the resault of a cross between a male Cooper's Hawk, and female Northern Goshawk. This may indicate a northward expansion of the Cooper's Hawk into the Northern Goshawk's historic range.

There are no currently recognized subspecies of Cooper's hawk. The previously described subspecies, A. c. mexicanus, was discounted due to being weakly differentiated. Genetic markers indicate that westerly birds, such those in British Columbia, are genetically different from those in the Upper Midwest, indicating that Cooper's Hawks were restricted to at least two Pleistocene glacial refugia, with the Rocky Mountains acting as a natural barrier to gene flow between the population of hawks on either side.

Several of the other similarly sized North American members within the genus Astur appear to be closely related, possibly within a species complex, to Cooper's Hawk. Namely, the bicolored hawk (A. bicolor), widely distributed from southern Mexico to Central South America, and the Chilean hawk (A. chilensis). While there is some degree of difference distinguishing these species (e.g. appearance, distribution, and behavior), the Cooper's hawk is now often considered a sister group to the Gundlach's hawk (A. gundlachi), a species of hawk endemic to Cuba.

In general, the relationship between Cooper's and Gundlach's hawks is muddled and genetic testing indicated that Gundlach's possibly may be insufficiently distinct to separate the species. Almost certainly, Cooper's hawk would at least qualify as the paraspecies for Gundlach's hawk, and datum have indicated fairly recent colonization and hybridization between the two.

== Description ==
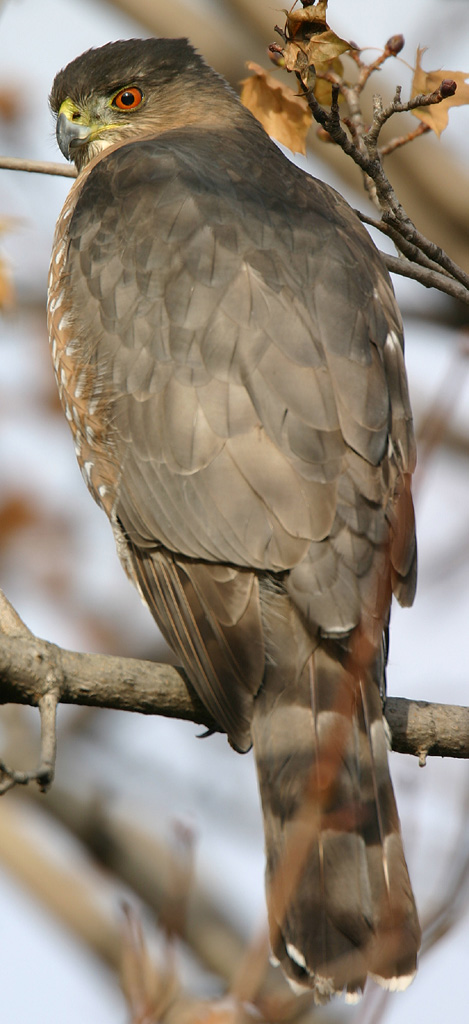
Adults may be either brown-grey or blue-grey above, with a distinctive, sizable head.

The Cooper's Hawk is a medium-sized hawk, though it errs on the smaller size compared to other species within Astur. Compared to related species, it tends to have moderate-length wings, a long, often graduated or even wedge-shaped tail, and long though moderately thick legs and toes. Its eyes tend to be set well forward in the sides of the relatively large and squarish-looking head (though the head can look somewhat rounded if the feathers on the nape are held flush) and a relatively short but robust bill. It has a hooked bill well-adapted for tearing the flesh of prey, as is typical of raptors.

Generally, Cooper's hawks can be considered secretive, often perching within the canopy, but uses more open perches, especially in the western part of the range or in winter, when they may use leafless or isolated trees, utility poles, or exposed stumps. On perched hawks, the wing tips tend to appear to cover less than one-third of the tail, sometimes seeming to barely cover the covert feathers.

As adults, they may be a solid blue-gray or brown-gray color above. Adults usually have a well-defined crown of blackish-brown feathers above a paler nape and hind neck offset against their streaked, rufous cheeks. Their tails are blue-gray on top and pale underneath, barred with three black bands in a rather even pattern and ending in a rather conspicuous white tip. The adult's underside shows a whitish base color overlaid heavily with coarse, irregular rufous to cinnamon bands, though these narrow into marginal shaft streaks around the throat. Against the rich color on the rest of the underside, the pure white crissum on adults is conspicuous. Adult females typically are slightly more brownish or grayish above, while some adult males can range rarely into almost a powder blue color.

Although little regional variation is seen in the plumage, adult coloring in the Pacific Northwest typically is slightly darker overall. Aberrant pale plumage was recorded in at least four birds, all of which were almost completely white and lacked any underside streaking. These birds had faded back color and lacked strong barring on the tail. An aberrant dark female was also recorded. As a juvenile, she had a blackish-brown (rather than mid-brown) back and dark, inky feathers below with grayish ground color barely showing. Later, she produced an aberrant male with similar characteristics that successfully fledged. The latter two were possible cases of melanism; such dark variations are virtually unprecedented in any Astur or Accipiter species.

Juveniles of the species are generally dark brown above, though the feathers are not infrequently edged with rufous to cinnamon and have a variable whitish mottling about the back, wing coverts, and mainly the scapulars. Juveniles tend to have streaking or washing of tawny on the cheeks, ending in a light nuchal strip, giving them a hooded appearance unlike the capped appearance of adults (some juveniles, unlike adults, also may manifest a slim supercilium). The crown is brown on juveniles rather than blackish as in adults. The tail is similar to that of the adult but more brownish and sometimes shows an additional fourth band. The juvenile has more pale white to cream base color showing than older birds, with variable dusky throat striping and mid-brown streaks, which appear as sharply defined from about the lower throat to the lower breast. The juvenile may have brown to black spots or bars on the thighs with thin black streaks mostly ending at the belly and conspicuous white crissum and undertail coverts. Juveniles may tend to appear more "disheveled" and less compact than adults in feather composition.

In flight, though usually considered medium-sized, Cooper's hawks appear fairly small, as emphasized by the short wings relative to the elongated tail (unlike unrelated hawks, the wingspan is usually less than twice as broad as the total length). The species tends to have rounded wings, a long, rounded tail, and long legs, much like other Astur and Accipiter species. Cooper's hawks have a strong flight with stiff beats and short glides, tending to do so on quite level wings with wrist thrust forward yet the head consistently projects. The five outer functional primaries are notched on their inner webs, the outermost is the longest, the next outermost nearly as long. When soaring, these hawks do so on flattish, or more commonly, slightly raised wings, with fairly straight leading edges. Against the barred underbody on adults, the wings are more or less flecked in similar color, with pale greyish flight feathers and a broadly white-tipped tail correspondingly barred with dark gray. Meanwhile, the upper side of adults is essentially all blue-grey. Juveniles are mostly dark above, though manifest a hooded effect on the head and rufous-buff edges and especially whitish mottling; the latter can be fairly apparent. Juveniles are mainly whitish below with neatly dark streaks about the wing linings, breast, flanks, and thighs, with bars on the axillaries and flight feathers. The tail of the juvenile has a broadly white tip and bars like adults, but the ground color is a paler shade of gray.

Adults' eyes range from light orange to red, with males typically darker in eye color, while those of juveniles are yellow. Among 370 breeding hawks from different parts of the range, 1-year-old males usually had light orange eyes and 1-year-old females usually yellow eyes. Males two or older typically have either orange (40.4%) or dark orange (32.3%) eyes, while females' eyes at this stage were light orange or lighter. From the second year, the eyes may grow darker still, but stop darkening soon thereafter. Three-year or older males were found to have predominantly dark orange (37.3% vs 21.6% of similar-aged females), red (34.6% vs 3.3% of similar-aged females) or mid-orange (26.6% vs 55% of similar-aged females). The purpose of bright eye color in the hawks may be correlated to feeding stimulation of nestling hawks (i.e. darker orange or red objects may be more perceptible and tend to be pecked at more so than duller colors). The eyes of this hawk, as in most predatory birds, face forward, enabling good depth perception for hunting and catching prey while flying at top speeds.

The molt begins in late April–May and takes about 4 months. The female usually begins to molt about 7–10 days sooner than the male, occurring inward towards the body on the wing feathers. Tail molt may generally start with the middle tail feathers, proceeding posteriorly to the upper tail coverts, also starting with the median feathers on the scapulars. Arrested molt has been recorded in the late nesting period, often pausing after the third primary is molted, or especially when food supplies are down during the brooding stage, and may be resumed after the stress of feeding the brooding diminishes.

=== Size ===
Cooper's hawks are fairly variable in size, with females being considerably larger than males. Females may measure in at around 20% larger linearly and around 40% (though the upper limit may be 125% ) heavier. However, populations of Cooper's hawks west of the Rocky Mountains tend to show slightly less pronounced sexual dimorphism than their eastern counterparts.

Sexual dimorphism in Cooper's hawks is most reliably measured by wing size, talon size, then body mass. Although some margin of error exists, within a given region, dimensions of the two sexes never overlap (except marginally in tarsal and tail lengths). In general, Astur and Accipiter species are among the most sexually dimorphic in size of all raptorial birds, which may be due to greater male efficiency through smaller size and resulting agility in food gathering for the family group. Meanwhile, the female may be better suited to the rigors of brooding (including perhaps most nest defense) due to her larger size, also allowing the sexes to compete less on the same food sources.

In the American southwest, though, the species reportedly may reach its largest sizes, but little evidence shows that these birds are distinctly larger than the large-bodied individuals measured in the more northeasterly parts of the species' range in North America, from eastern North Dakota to New Jersey. The size variation evidenced in Cooper's hawks is apparently the most pronounced of any of the three North American species of Astur/Accipiter. Cooper's hawks, though, are one of an estimated 25% of studied bird species that do not appear to correspond to Bergmann's rule (i.e. being larger where living farther north) instead varying in size much more so by longitude. Total length of full-grown birds can vary from 35 to 46 cm (14 to 18 in) in males and 42 to 50 cm (17 to 20 in) in females. Wingspan may range from 62 to 99 cm (24 to 39 in), with an average around 84 cm (33 in).

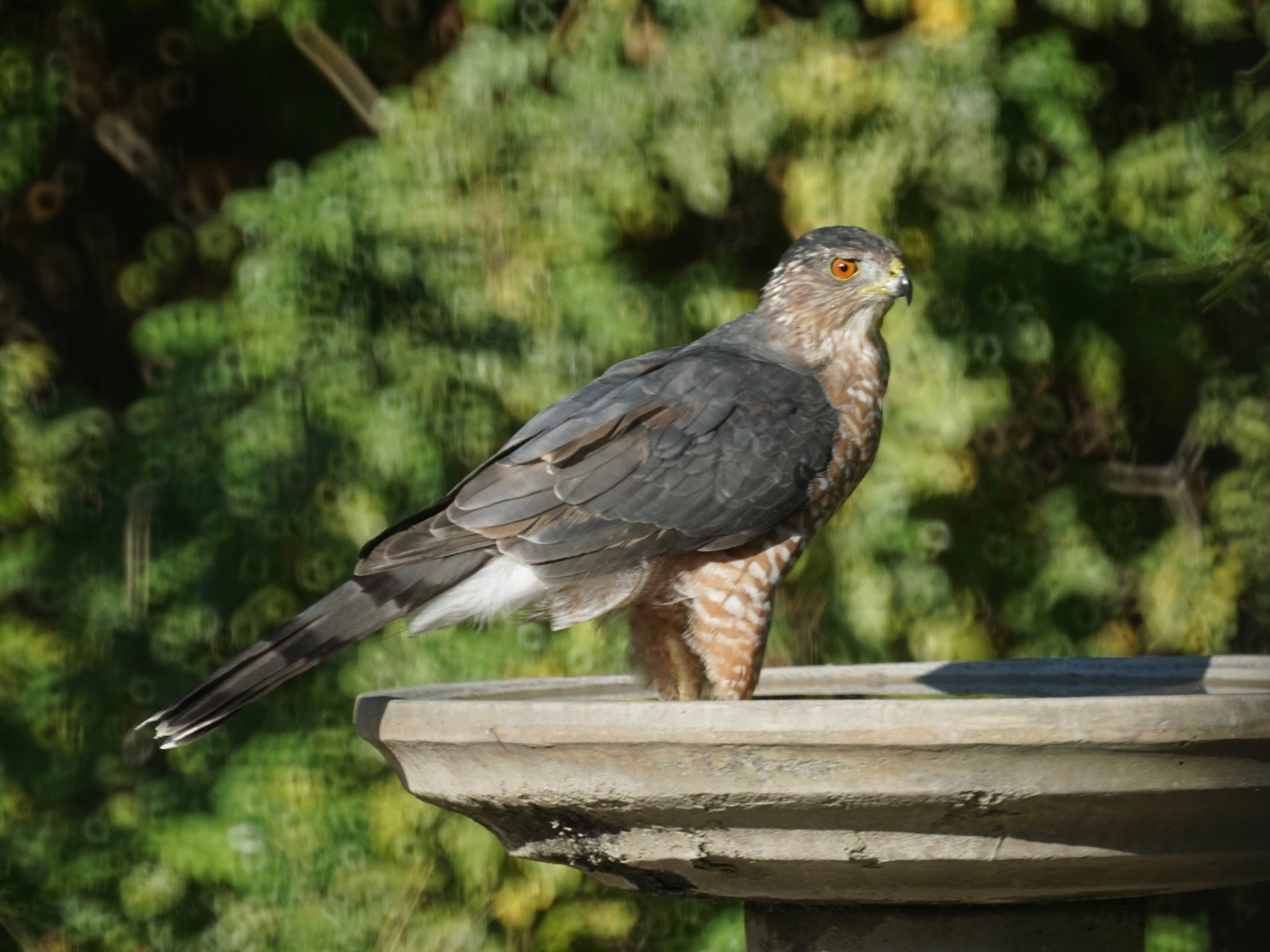
An adult Cooper's hawk illustrates its midsized frame and very long tail.

Among standard measurements, the wing chord may vary from 214 to 252 mm (8.4 to 9.9 in) in males and from 247 to 278 mm (9.7 to 10.9 in) in females. Wing chord is generally commensurate with body mass, largest in the heavier hawks of eastern North Dakota, where males averaged 232.6 mm (9.16 in) and females 264.3 mm (10.41 in), and in Wisconsin, where males averaged 236.9 mm (9.33 in) and females 267.1 mm (10.52 in) (those from Cape May also being similar to those two samples).

=== Voice ===
Cooper's hawk vocalization
A Cooper's hawk calling from an urban park in Minnesota

During breeding, Cooper's hawks may utter well over 40 claimed call variations, which would rank them as having among the most varied collection of such for any raptor, but probably quite subtle (marginal differences in harshness, clarity, tempo and volume). The typical call of a Cooper's hawk is a harsh, cackling yelp, which may be translated as keh-keh-keh, with males tending to have a higher-pitched, less-raspy, and faster-paced voice than females. Some variants by males, though, were deeper than the female's version of said calls. A still more modulated and raucous version is given during the dawn chorus. Some studies have indicated that pairs nesting in more deeply wooded areas may vocalize more frequently due to inferior sight lines. Some evidence may indicate that individual hawks' voices may become lower pitched with age. When coming with food to the nest or while displaying during courtship, the male may let out a nighthawk-like kik; apparently, this call is more prevalent in pairs using thicker woods. Infrequently, a female may utter the kik call, as well, apparently when looking for her mate or gathering nesting materials. Many soft calls have been recorded in intimate or "conversational" interactions, exclusively between breeding pairs and between mothers and their broods.

The initial call of the young is a cheep or chirrp, which by the time they are fledging alters to a penetrating hunger call, eeeeeeee-oo or tseeeee-ar (among different transliterations). The higher-pitched calls of the young may even extend to females nesting within their first year while still in immature plumage. Females may have their own hunger cry, whaaaa, heard especially in poorer food areas, when the male appears. Nonetheless, this female call also has been uttered in different contexts, such as during nest building or a "postural bowing" display, thus communicating to the male that approaching her is not dangerous for him (as Astur/Accipiter females can be dangerous to the much smaller males). Generally, Cooper's hawks are silent outside the breeding season. Rarely, though, some males that appear to be isolated from any other hawks of their species have been known to call during winter.

=== Confusion species ===
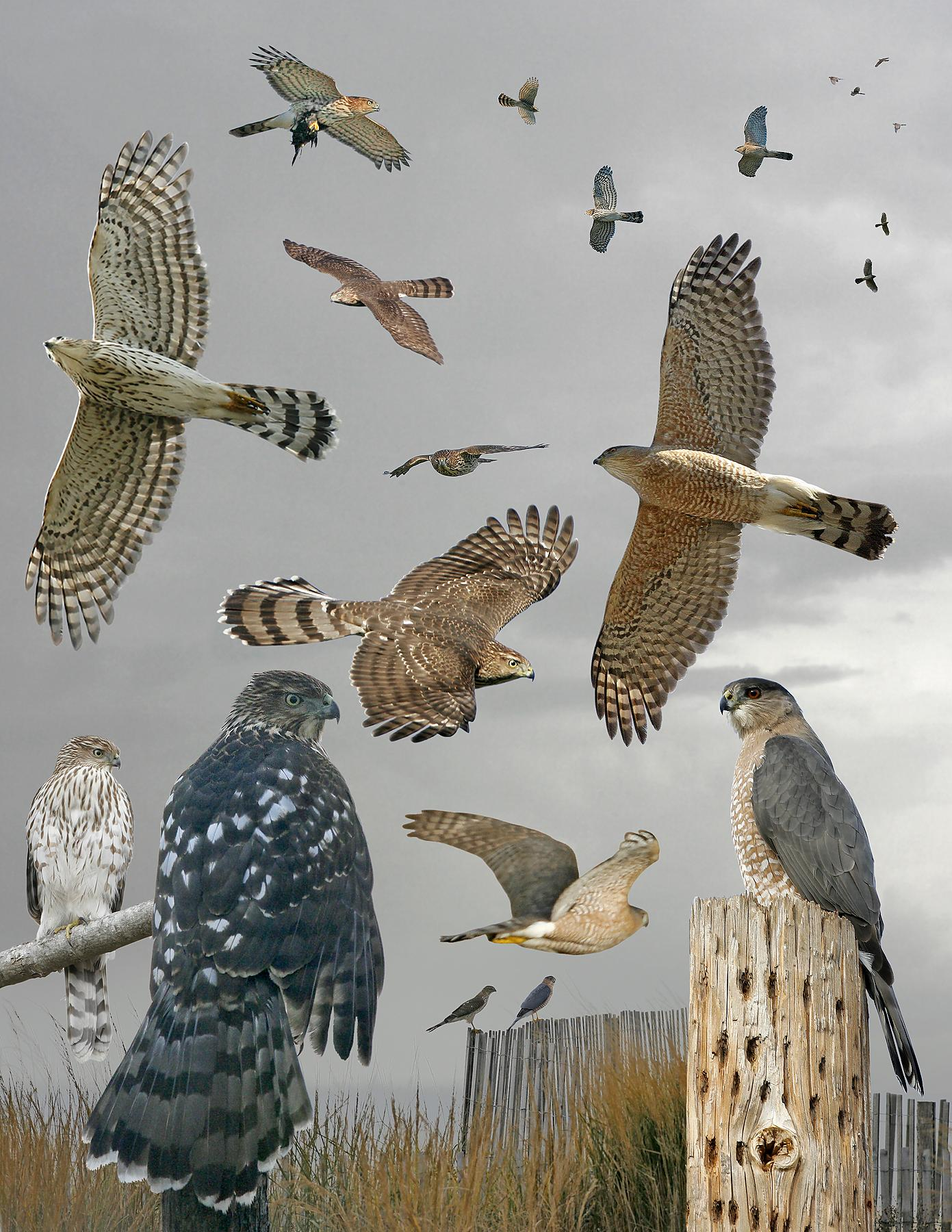
Composite image of Cooper's hawks for identification

Accipiter and Astur species in North America are arguably the most vexing raptors to identify there. The other two species in North America are the smaller sharp-shinned hawk (Accipiter striatus) and the larger American goshawk (Astur atricapillus). Compared to the other two species, Cooper's hawks have an intermediate amount of feathering at top of the tarsus, as well as intermediate relative middle toe length and eye proportions, but have relatively the longest tail and the shortest wings of the three. Cooper's and sharp-shinned hawks are very similar (sometimes considered almost identical) in plumage characteristics at all stages of development. Most Cooper's hawks are considerably larger than most sharp-shinned hawks. Generally, a Cooper's species is crow-sized, with the males about the size of a small crow and the females the size of a large crow, while most sharp-shinned hawks are about the size of a large jay. Also in the hand, Cooper's hawks and sharp-shinned hawks may be fairly reliably distinguished by their sizes, with the smallest male Cooper's always being heavier and larger clawed than the largest female sharp-shinned hawk (with a 97–98% difference in dimensions of the wing and tail). However, in the field, especially when hawks must be identified in at a distance or at unfavorable angles (such as when migrating) or at a brief glance (such as when hunting), even experienced birdwatchers may not always be able to certainly distinguish the two species, especially female sharp-shins against the nearly similarly sized male Cooper's.

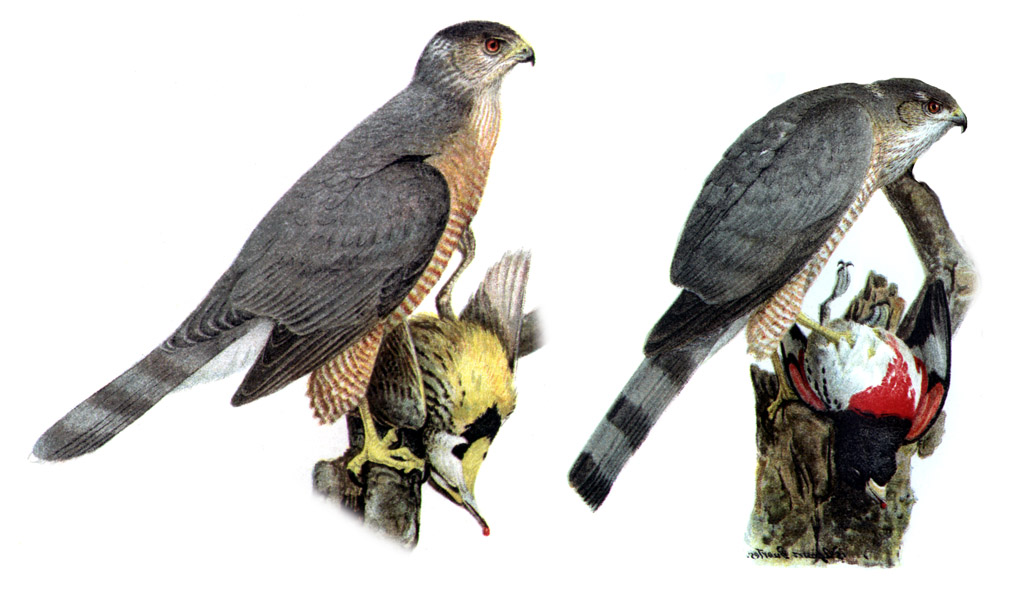
Comparison of a male Cooper's hawk (left) with prey and a female sharp-shinned hawk (right) with prey: Both prey items are about one-third the weight of the respective hawks.

As for the American goshawk, the smallest male is still usually "clearly" larger than most large female Cooper's hawks.

More unlikely to be mistaken for a Cooper's hawk are some buteonine hawks such as gray hawks (Buteo plagiatus), roadside hawks (Rupornis magnirostris) (in Mexico and points south) and broad-winged hawks (Buteo platypterus) which are all similar in size to Cooper's as well as the slightly larger red-shouldered hawk (Buteo lineatus). Even the most similar buteonine hawks have notably different proportions than a Cooper's hawk, possessing relatively much longer wings and a much shorter tail. Given reasonable views, all such species are fairly to extremely different in plumage even in juvenile form.

== Distribution and habitat ==
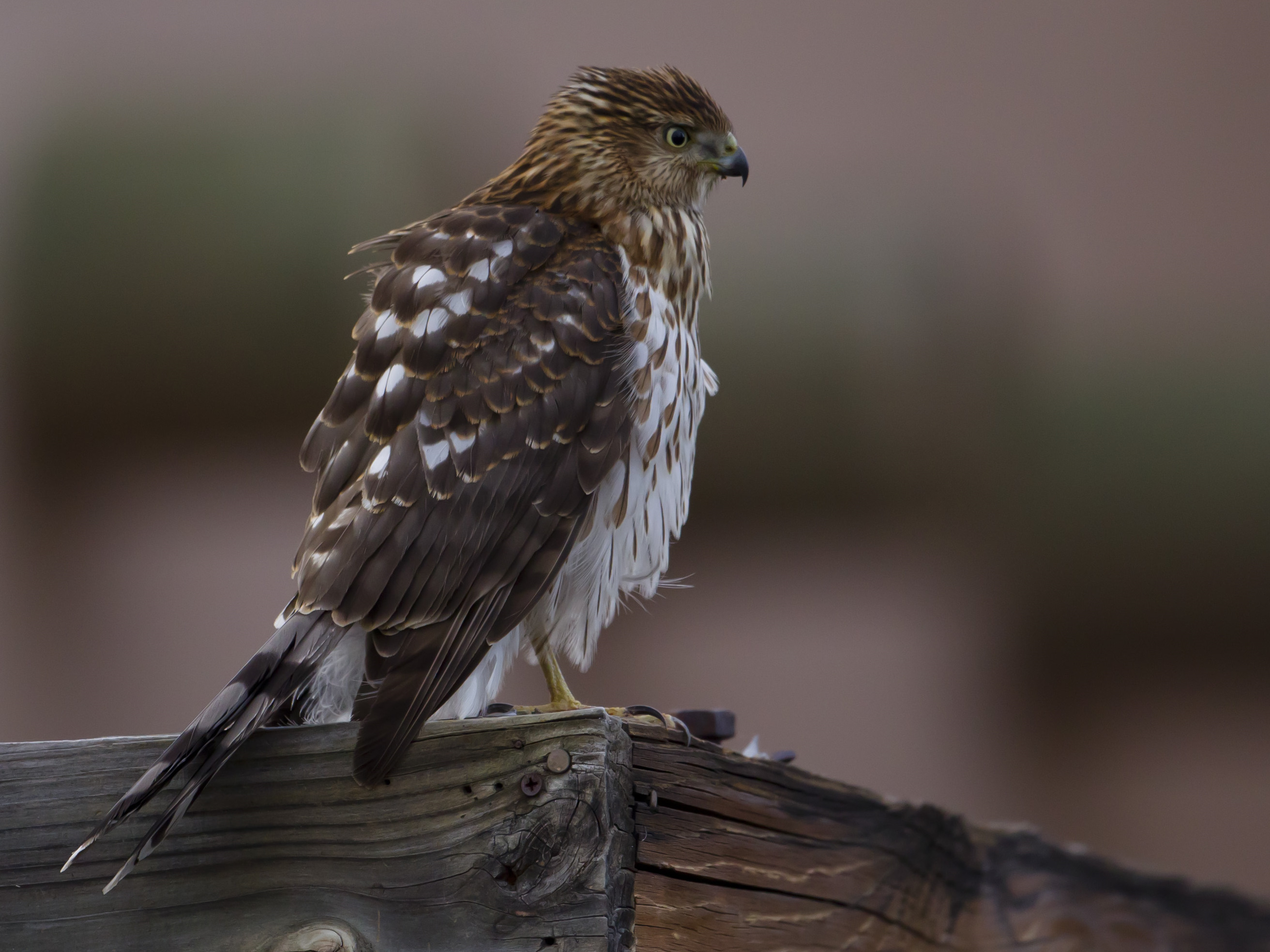
A juvenile Cooper's hawk making use of a temporary perch in the open

Cooper's hawk's breeding range extends from southern Canada to northern Mexico. In southern Canada, they breed (but do not normally winter) in the southerly parts of the provinces of British Columbia, Alberta, Saskatchewan, Manitoba, Ontario, Quebec to extreme southwestern Nova Scotia. The northern extent of their breeding range reaches roughly to Jasper National Park and Cedar Lake, Manitoba. Cooper's hawks can be found across the entirety of the contiguous United States at some part of the year, excepting the northernmost region of Maine. Their breeding range terminates along the Gulf Coast and south Florida, and south of the Rio Grande, excepting their Mexican breeding range consisting of northern Baja California, the mountains from eastern Sonora and Chihuahua to Durango, also recently in northern Coahuila, formerly east into Nuevo Leon and south to Michoacán and possibly still in Guerrero. In Oaxaca, records show that the species has been recorded year-around with the first confirmed breeding reported in 2001.

In winter, they are found up to the southern half of Washington, the southern two-thirds of Idaho and Wyoming, southern South Dakota, the southern parts of Minnesota, Wisconsin, and Michigan, extreme southwestern Ontario, southwestern and southeastern New York, and New England through all but northwestern Massachusetts and to the southeastern part of New Hampshire. In winter, they range regularly throughout the parts of the southern United States, where they do not breed, such as all Gulf Coast areas and in South Florida. Wintering Cooper's hawks are common through all parts of Mexico except the Yucatán Peninsula, with Central American populations occurring in Guatemala and the border regions of Honduras and Nicaragua.

=== Habitat ===
Cooper's hawks tend to occur in various types of temperate deciduous forest and mixed forest. They are also adaptable in all seasons to forested mountainous regions, especially foothills. The species may further may occur in some pure conifer forest, including the extreme southern part of the taiga, but also in many parts of the west. The species can habituate favorably while breeding to various kinds of open woodlands, including small woodlots, riparian woodlands in dry country, pinyon woodlands, farmlands and floodplains.

In denser forest areas, these hawks tend to prefer easy access to edges, clearings, roads, and waterways. For example, average distances between waterways and nests in Wisconsin and Utah were 66.1 and 224 m (217 and 735 ft), respectively. In the Appalachians, no detectable preference for access to water was seen. Forest edges, in particular, tend to be key, as these are peak hunting grounds for these hawks. Cooper's hawks usually occur at elevations from sea level to 2,500 m (8,200 ft), more infrequently up to 3,000 m (9,800 ft).

In the American southwest and northwestern Mexico, they are commonly considered a bird of wooded foothills, often dwelling above 1,000 m (3,300 ft).

Although they often live in areas where deciduous trees are predominant, almost throughout the range, they are often attracted to stands of conifers, which due to their density, provide more extensive shelter and perhaps a more sturdy nesting site. So in Massachusetts and Wisconsin, they most often used stands of white pines (Pinus strobus). Additional Wisconsin studies showed that exotic conifer stands now support many Cooper's hawks even where native woodland is available. Tall, native deciduous tree stands may still be used extensively elsewhere, i.e. American beeches (Fagus grandifolia) in New York (nearly 40% of nest trees used) and oaks in Maryland (60% of trees used as nests). This species often prefers fairly mature forest, i.e. in two different areas of Oregon, Cooper's hawks preferred areas with trees of 30–60 years old (and 656 trees per ha) and 50–70 years old (and 1159 trees per ha), respectively. On average, the number of trees per hectare in Arkansas were found to be 935.7. Canopy coverage is key to nesting Cooper's hawks, needing to be about 55–70%, averaging 55% in Wisconsin and 69.8% in Arizona.

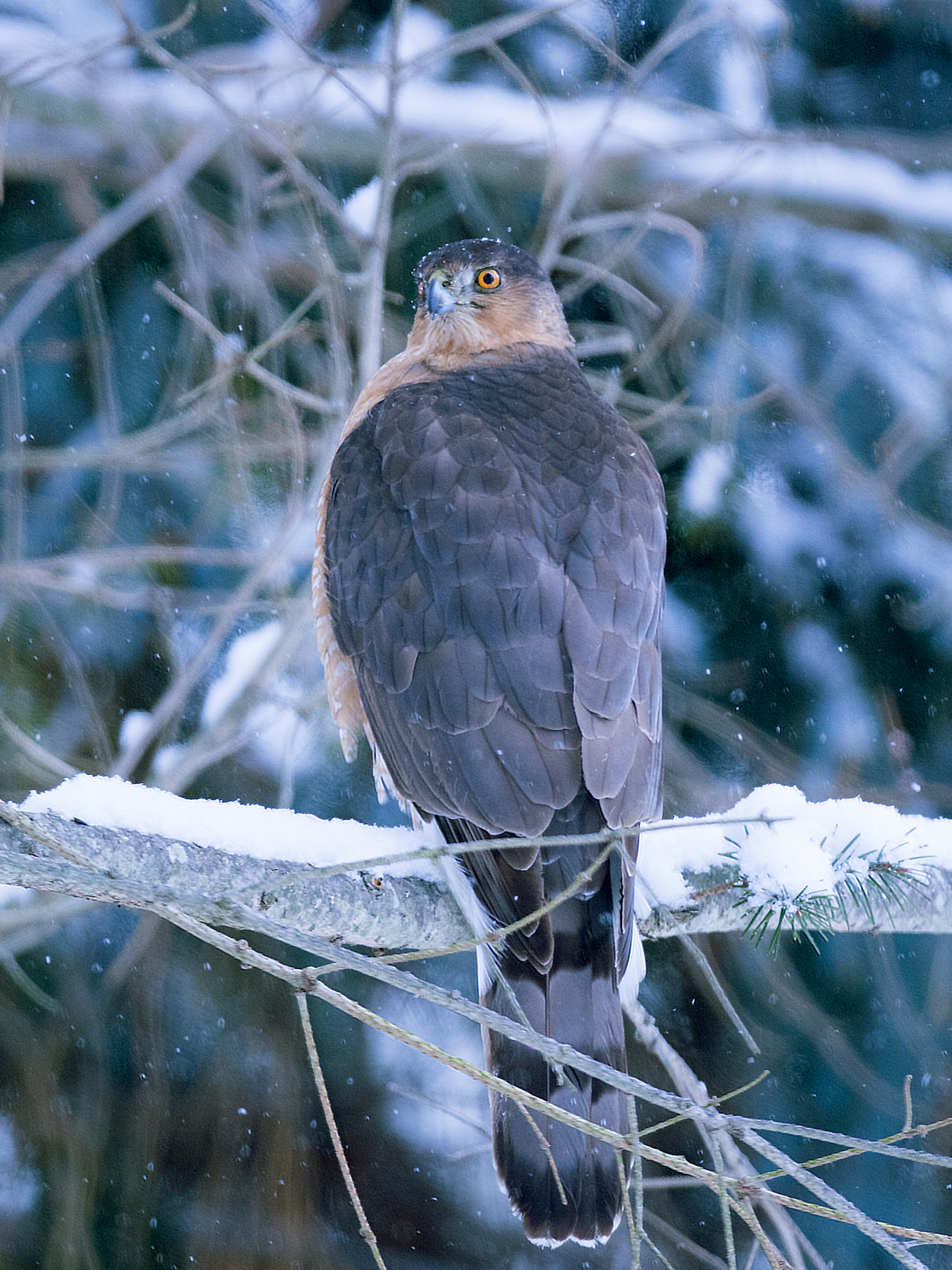
Cooper's hawk are regular in wintery, snowy areas in the cooler months

More so than breeding habitat, wintering habitat seems to be highly opportunistic. They may be found in any environment with some trees, including open woods, parkland, and scrub areas. In Central America, wintering Cooper's hawks have been recorded in unusual habitats such as stunted cloud forest and treeless montane grassland. In most parts of the range, Cooper's hawks have shown to be somewhat adaptive to all gradients of human development, including urbanized areas, and they can even nest in many cities. They were once thought to be averse to them, but are now fairly common in urban and suburban areas, even when nesting. The species may even making use of isolated trees in suburbs, industrial parks, and strip and shopping malls though large urban parks and other available wooded habitat is usually preferred in such areas when nesting. Cities provide plenty of prey species such as pigeons and doves and invasive species of birds for Cooper's hawk prey.

== Behavior ==
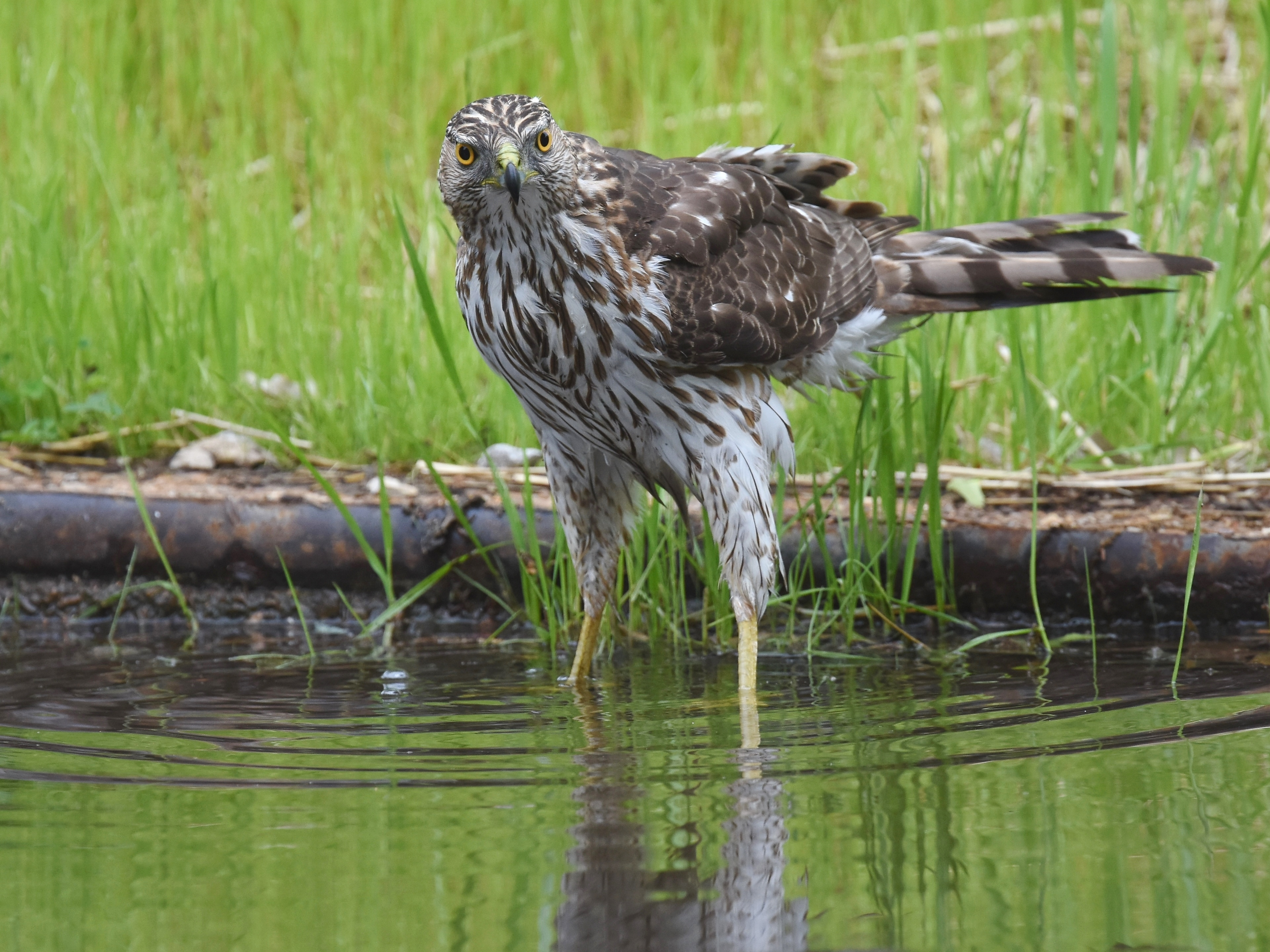
A young Cooper's hawk makes use of a large roadside puddle as a bath

This species tends to be active earlier in the morning than sharp-shinned hawks and in the morning than in the afternoon. These hawks may readily take to conifers to roost, generally sleeping with their heads tucked in. During daylight hours, they tend to preen while sitting on a perch about 11 times a day, and may take about up to 20 minutes to do so. When drinking, Cooper's hawks prefer relatively secluded waterways. In more arid regions, they may seek artificial bodies of water to drink from. Although a rare behavior, several cases of juvenile hawks proning, wherein they lie on their backs along a branch (or rarely the ground), apparently as a form of sunning, have been reported. Cooper's hawks may walk on ground to gather nesting materials or hunt. Their well-developed muscle mass powers their flight, especially helping with acceleration during hunts and when carrying heavy prey, but some other nonraptorial birds may have similar muscularity relative to their mass, such as the Canada goose (Branta canadensis) and even pied-billed grebes (Podilymbus podiceps), and these ample muscle masses may be correlated with migratory (rather than hunting) behavior. Cooper's hawks have been recorded as engaging in an exaggerated, nighthawk-like flight in noncourtship circumstances, such as during migration or by recent fledglings.

=== Migration ===
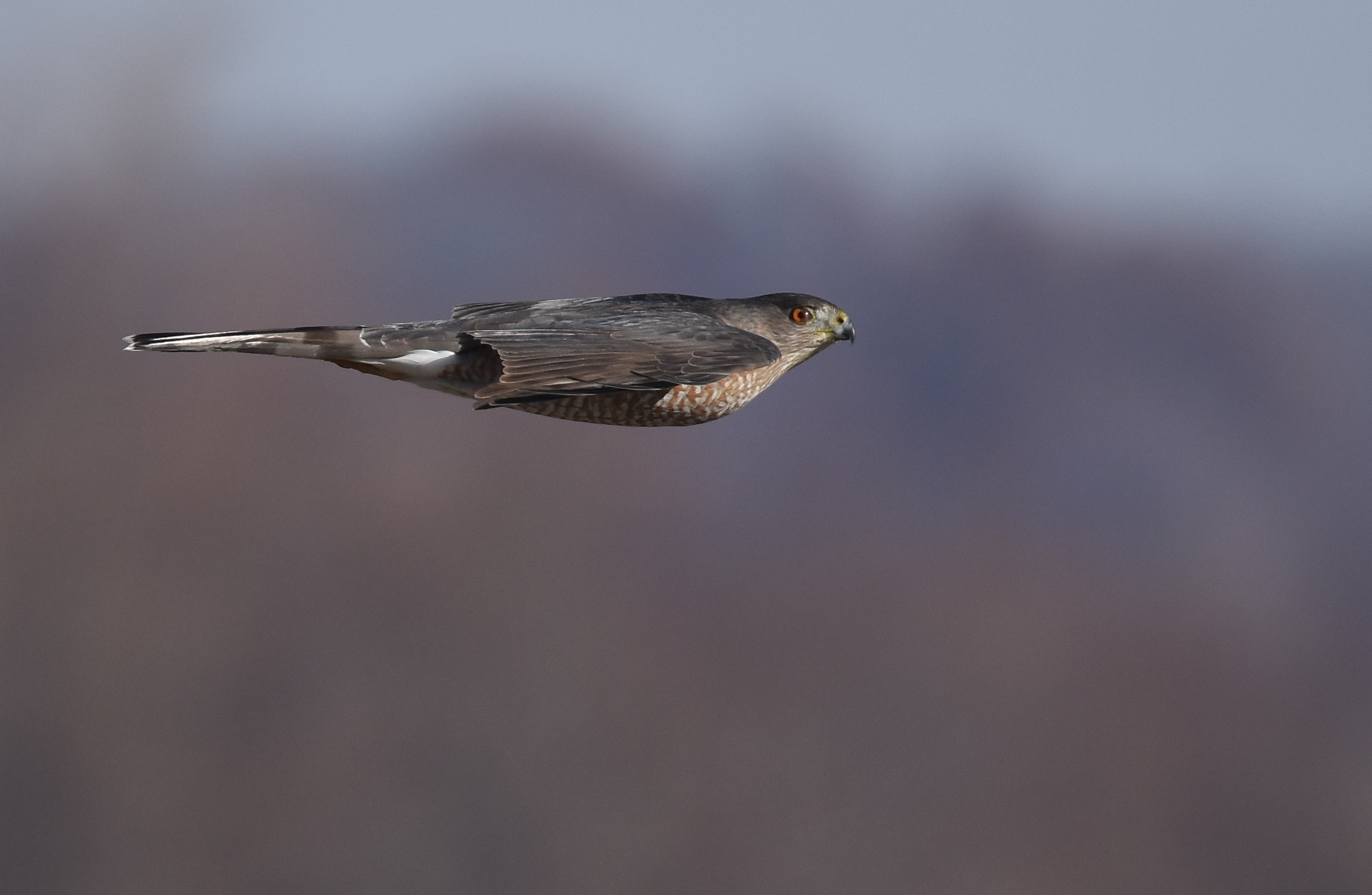
The distinctive long-tailed, large headed form of Cooper's hawk in flight; short wings, seen when flapping, are also characteristic.

Like most diurnal birds of prey in the Northern Hemisphere, Cooper's hawks are partial migrants; they tend to be most migratory in the north and largely to partially sedentary elsewhere. With individual exceptions, hawks of the species largely migrate out of nearly all of their range in southern Canada and cooler parts of the Pacific Northwest, essentially all of Montana and northern parts of surrounding states, North Dakota and northern South Dakota), the northern parts of the Great Lake states, northern New York, and much of New England. Despite being classed as sedentary, banding studies have revealed that many Cooper's hawks south of the typical migratory populations engage in some variety of seasonal winter movements.

Migratory movements in the autumn are generally between late August and mid-October, peaking at the end of September and beginning of October in the East, but sometimes migration extends into November. Meanwhile, spring northward migration may vary from the end of February to May, with the last ones leaving Mexico in April and very late individuals were passing over South Texas in late May. Generally, spring migration is more dispersed and less consistent than fall migration. Evidence from the Great Lakes region found that spring migration is occurring sooner due to warming temperatures in recent years. Migration appears to be timed to coincide with that of the main prey, medium-sized birds. In migration, first-year juveniles precede two-year-old hawks, which themselves precede adults when moving south in fall. Furthermore, females of all ages tend to migrate sooner and spend longer in winter quarters than like-aged males, the latter staying relatively north and traveling back again earlier. At regular western migration sites, the average differencein timing for Cooper's hawks of the earlier females and later males of like age was five days.

At coastal migration sites like Cape May, first-year Cooper's hawks are far more regularly encountered than older individuals, with the juveniles accounting for 92.7% of recorded individuals of the species (juveniles of various other raptor species also generally seem to favor coastal over montane migration when it is available).

== Diet ==
=== Hunting methods ===
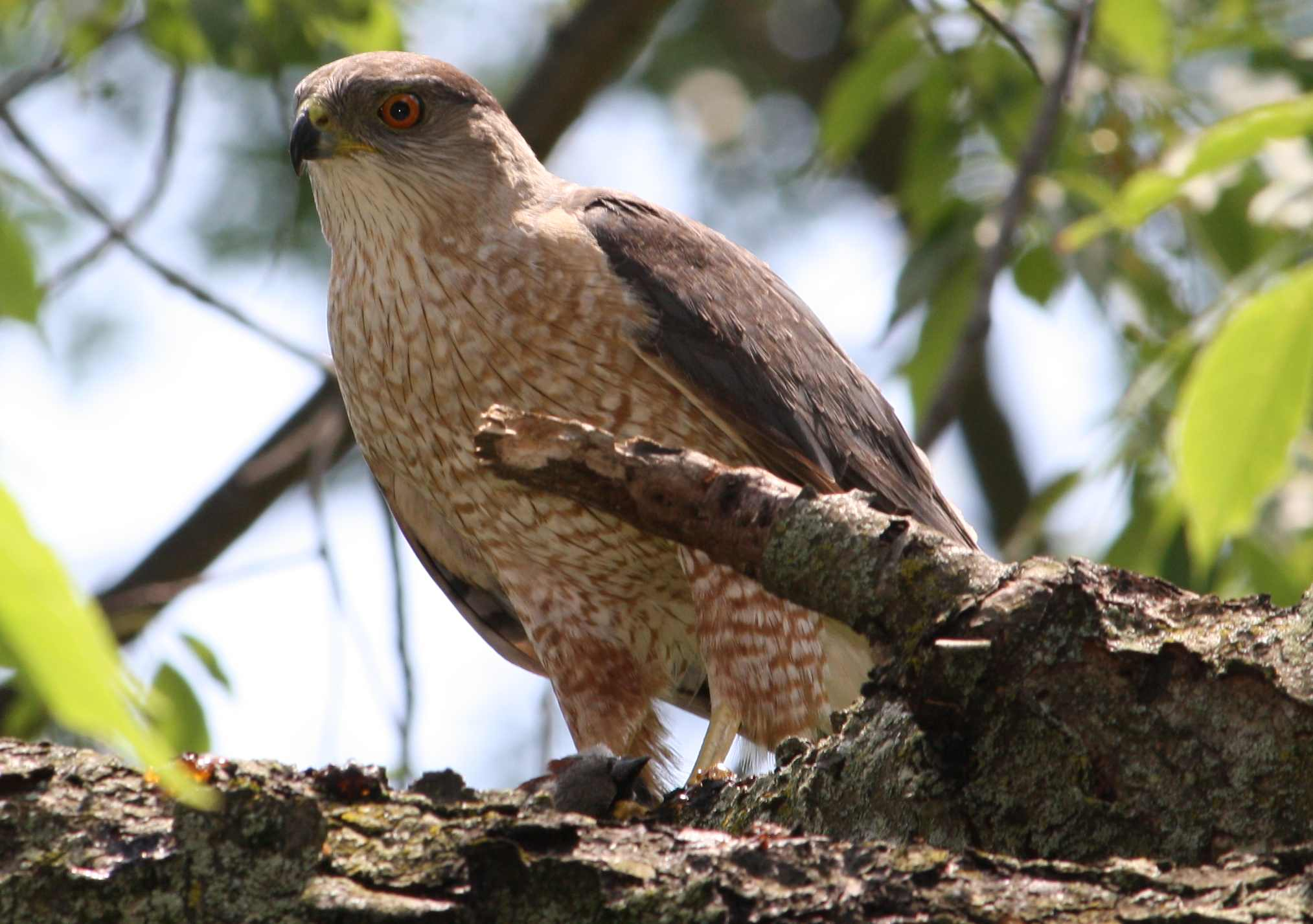
An adult Cooper's hawk with a typical bird kill, appearing to be a male house sparrow

Cooper's hawks are known as bold and aggressive predators. Given their dietary habits, these hawks bore a poor reputation well into the 20th century, with one account describing the species as "noxious", an "avian outlaw", and "a relentless tyrant and murderer of small birds". Another describes the species as "bloodthirsty" and a "villain". Early accounts underestimated the opportunistic nature of Cooper's hawks' hunting behavior and provided little insight into the actual effect the hawks have on their prey.

If it sees birds when flying, a hunting hawk does not fly directly to them, but instead circles around to available trees and bushes, often perching for a few moments before launching its attack. If birds become aware of it, the hawk tends to gain height quickly in hopes of intercepting some prey. Compared to some other North American raptors that are more likely to watch for prey on the ground and/or in the open, Cooper's hawks had a rather enlarged binocular field. During hunts, these hawks may suddenly alight when detecting an available mammal. Sometimes, Cooper's hawks engage in tandem hunts with one dashing around after the prey, while another waits on the other side of a tree trunk or wooded thicket. Many birds are caught when they inadvertently fly around a tree where a hawk is perched inconspicuously. Young Cooper's hawks are impetuous about crashing into bushes after prey, sometimes even into thorny cover such as barberries, whereas adults are said to be more "prudent". They may chase prey into cover or from bush to bush. The first instance of nonpiratical scavenging on carrion was recorded when a Cooper's hawk was seen eating at a white-tailed deer (Odocoileus virginianus) carcass.

When hunting bats, they can follow all twists and turns, and may succeed in capture in up to 90% of hunts. Much like goshawks, Cooper's hawks sometimes capture rabbits by pursuing on the ground, half-running, half-flying. Other on-foot hunting efforts, especially when chasing quail, have been detected, as well. When hunting sparrows, Cooper's hawks may make multiple passes on a bush before success, and the efforts can take up to 45 minutes. During hunts of feral pigeons (Columba livia) in urban areas, they have been seen to engage in open-air stoops to capture the prey. An unusual harrier-like flight was seen in a Cooper's hawk before an attack on aquatic prey in a marsh. Most prey is killed by repeatedly kneading the talons, with the kneading sometimes going on even after death, although in some cases, birds are plucked while still alive. Despite its gracile appearance, a Cooper's hawk is extremely powerful for its size and presumably able to capture larger prey relative to its size than other raptors such as falcons and Buteo species (including red-tailed hawks (B. jamaicensis)) due to its unusually high velocity on foot and resulting impact during prey capture. At times after capture, Cooper's hawks have been seen to hold still-living prey underwater, presumably trying to drown it. Subsequent to the prey's demise, they may eat the victim headfirst, followed by the viscera, with the meat eaten lastly. Like other raptors that most regularly take birds, Cooper's hawk was profiled in a study as an "attacker" rather than a "searcher" (i.e. mammal-hunters such as Buteo). "Attackers" such as Accipiter and Astur hawks and large falcons usually had lower hunting success rates, which averaged among the attacker species at 27%, due to the difficulty of capturing the prey. In 45 observations in Missouri, 15 hunts were successful.

=== Prey spectrum ===
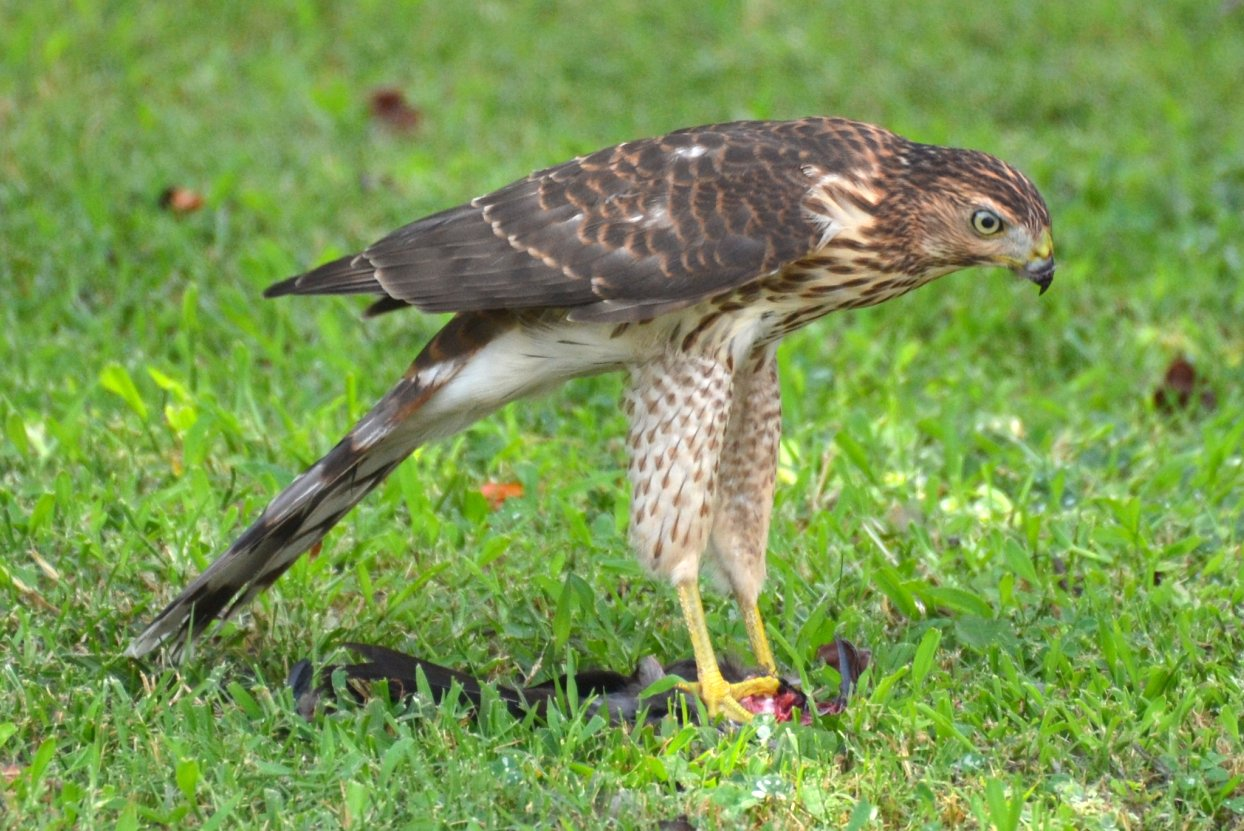
A Cooper's hawk with a common grackle as its prey

Cooper's hawks may consume well over 300 prey species from across the range. They are known to consume vertebrate prey almost exclusively. Often small to medium-sized birds are the preferred food, but also many small mammals, and in more arid vicinities, lizards are regularly taken. Infrequently, frogs may be eaten, as are (rarely) insects and fish in nearly dry watercourses. Birds in general form about 50–85% of diet. One estimate is that globally birds form about 71.1% of the diet, 17.9% mammals, 8.9% reptiles and 2.1% other prey. Cooper's hawks generally prefers birds on the ground or at shrub level.

=== Birds ===
==== Predation rates and passerines ====
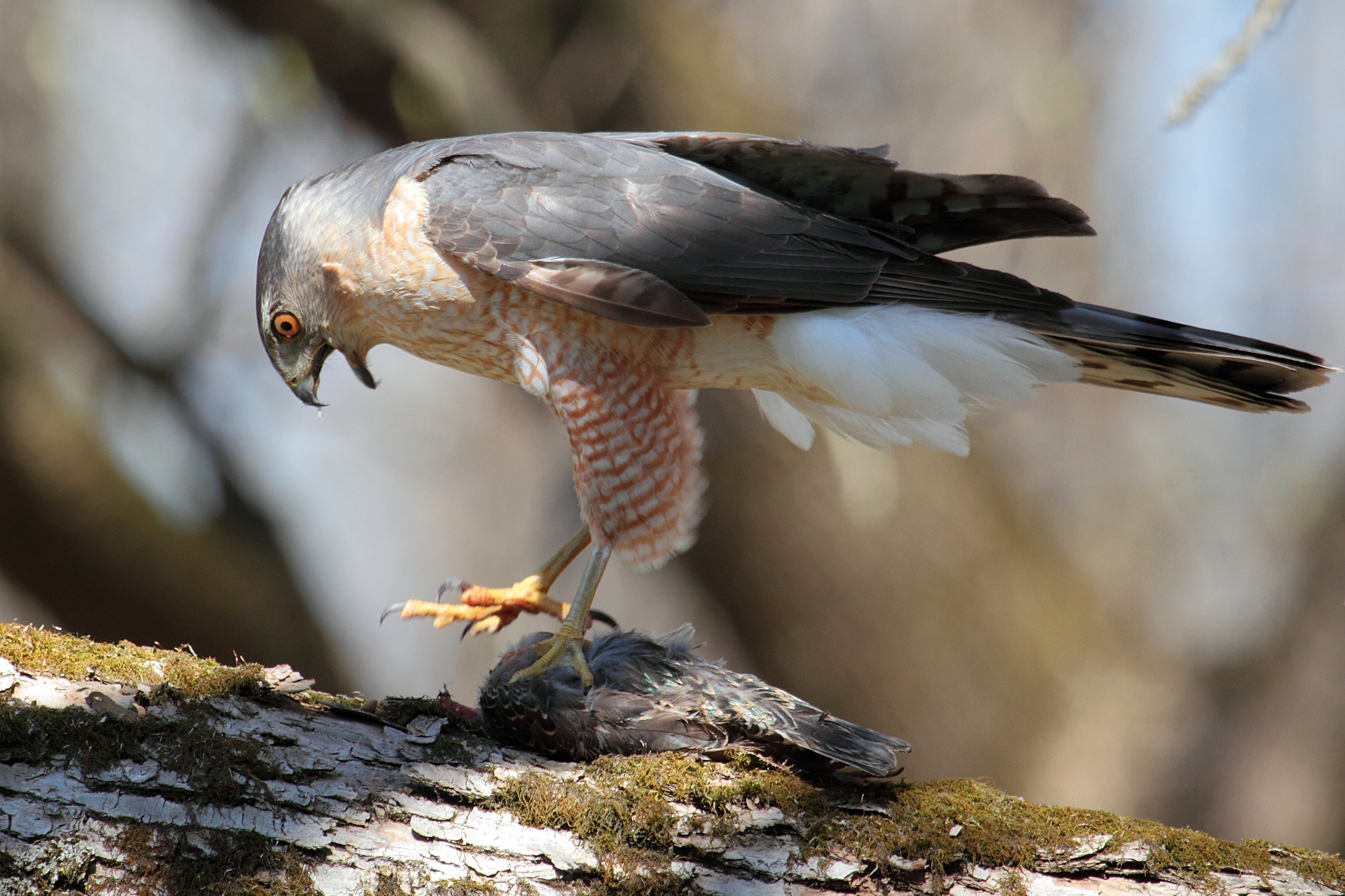
An adult Cooper's hawk that has caught a common starling, one of the most widely taken prey for this species.

Birds are by far the leading prey for Cooper's hawks in most areas. A wide diversity of birds, considerably over 250 species, are known to be taken, constituting more than three-quarters of known prey species for these hawks. A Cooper's hawk is estimated to kill an average of two birds a day, or 700 birds a year. Although prior data mostly reflected the taking of adult birds, a study in Wisconsin revealed that Cooper's hawks may largely take young of the year, mostly fledglings but also not infrequently nestlings, during the breeding season. 74% of ageable bird prey in this study were young of the year. Similarly, in Michigan during summer, immature birds were more than 2.5 times more often delivered to Cooper's hawk nests than adult birds. In one case, a Cooper's hawk was seen to fly away with an entire occupied nest of American goldfinches (Spinus tristis). One study determined that birds that nest in the canopy level tended to nest fairly close to this hawk but those with mid-level, shrub level and ground level nests nested farther away, indicating that non-canopy-nesting birds are generally taken during the breeding season. Key to prey selection for Cooper's hawk is the availability and abundance of birds in a given region. Therefore, the extremely numerous American robin (Turdus migratorius) appears to be the most widely reported prey species. Robins were the leading prey species in northwestern Oregon, at 19.6% of 281 prey items, Lopez Island, Washington, 23.4% of 107 prey items, in Victoria, British Columbia, at 34.6% of 2896 prey items and prominent but ranked second also in California (Berkeley and Albany) food studies, 24.5% of 1057 prey items. The robin is regularly hunted in all seasons due to its commonality in exurban regions, with both adults, at estimated averages of 79 to 81.2 g (2.79 to 2.86 oz) when taken, and young being relatively easy for them to access. Beyond the common robin, nearly all thrushes in North America (excluding one species whose breeding range is largely north of Cooper's range and one rare, little-studied species) are opportunistically hunted by Cooper's hawks. The closest rival to the robin in being most widely taken as prey for Cooper's hawks may be the common starling (Sturnus vulgaris), a non-native bird in North America with mean weights when taken of 79 to 82 g (2.8 to 2.9 oz). The starling was the main food for these hawks in Ithaca, New York, at 28.2% of 857 prey items, and Terre Haute, Indiana, at 56.5% of 57 prey items, and taken in large but somewhat secondary numbers in Missouri, Michigan, and Victoria, British Columbia. In the urban environment of Terre Haute, it was found that starlings were taken in almost the same proportion as starlings were of all birds observed by researchers (i.e. they were 60% of 2146 individual birds seen).

Over 60% of the bird species known in Cooper's hawks' prey spectrum are passerines (including thrushes and starlings). Other medium-sized to largish-bodied families of passerines tend to be most often selected. In many circumstances, Cooper's hawks hunt corvids, large, intelligent and social passerines, with the smallish jays being particularly popular.

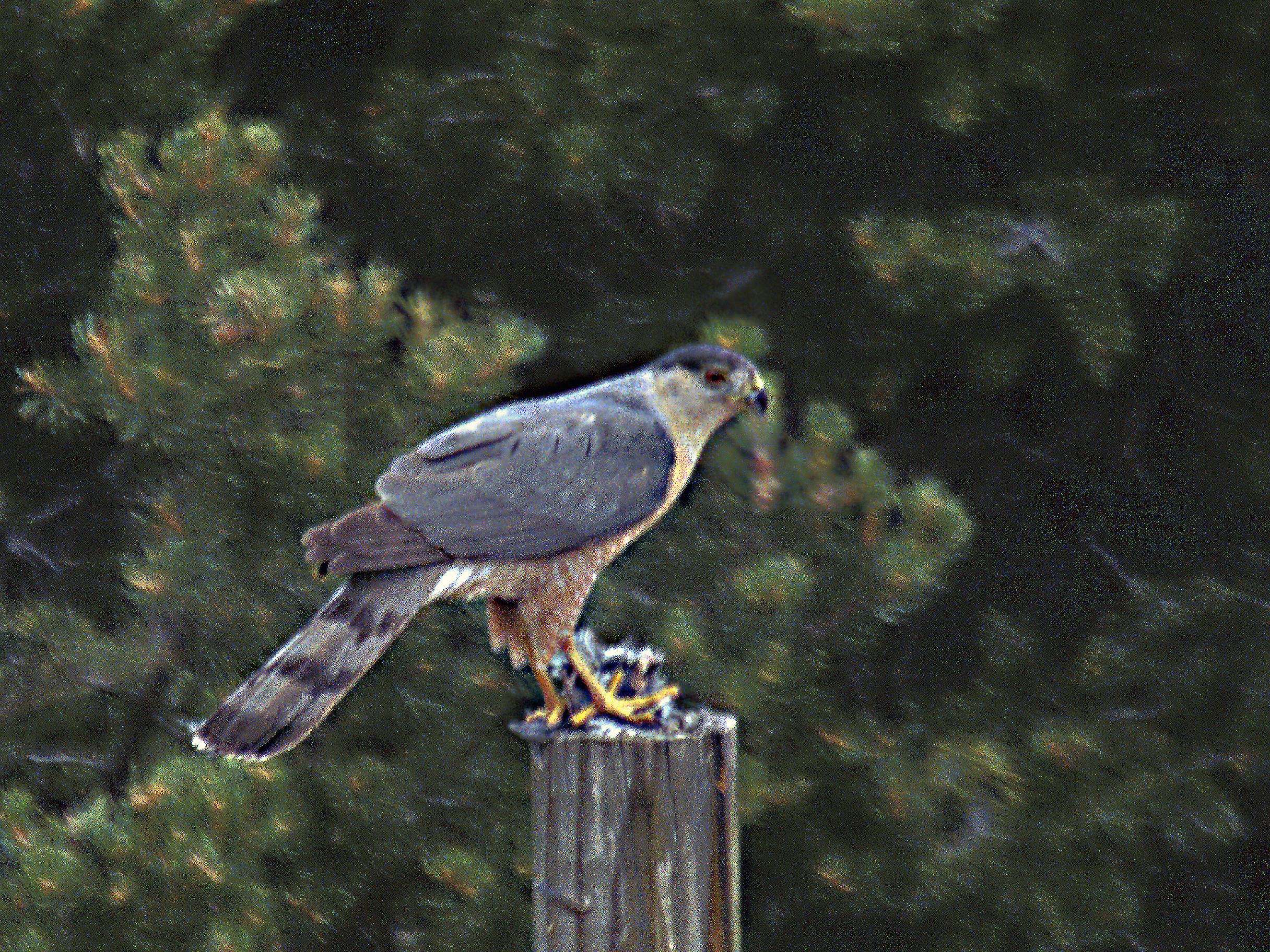
Eating a finch in a backyard with feeders

Other passerine families (i.e. outside thrushes, corvids, and icterids) tend to not be as large-bodied, so by no means neglected, are seldom equal in overall (biomass). About 15 species of tyrant flycatcher, several species each of vireos, swallows, tits, nuthatches, wrens, mimids, about a dozen species of finches, cardinalids, and a huge diversity of American sparrows and New World warblers (nearly 30 species each) are known to be taken by Cooper's hawks. A lower diversity are taken of shrikes, larks, penduline tits, aegithalids, treecreepers, dippers, silky-flycatchers and longspurs. The more numerous native passerines, such as northern cardinals (Cardinalis cardinalis) and northern mockingbirds (Mimus polyglottos), have good reason to fear these hawks, as they are widely and regularly taken as are even common birds of less than half their size (around 20 g (0.71 oz)), such as song sparrows (Melospiza melodia), dark-eyed juncos (Junco hiemalis), and house finches (Haemorhous mexicanus). During harsh late winter weather in Wisconsin, Cooper's hawks were recorded to eke out an existence living largely off of pine siskins (Spinus pinus). In modern terms, certainly the most commonly taken small bird would be the non-native, 29 g (1.0 oz) house sparrow (Passer domesticus). Although not known to be taken profusely in all studied urban locales, house sparrows were the leading prey in a study from Michigan, were nearly a third of observed delivered prey at nests in Victoria, British Columbia (although were outnumbered by robins in prey remains) and reportedly were the leading prey in Milwaukee and in Grand Forks, North Dakota. Flycatchers are not hugely significant in Cooper's hawk's foods, but the local effect of the hawks on populations can be considerable. For example, willow flycatchers (Empidonax traillii) in California suffered a 76% rate of nest predation, among which Cooper's hawks were a considerable contributor, and dusky flycatchers (Empidonax oberholseri) experienced a rate of 96% predation elsewhere in California, with 25% attributable to Cooper's. Similar determent to the local nesting attempts of other small passerines such as warblers has also been reported. Chickadees seem to regard Cooper's hawks as a moderate threat based on their anti-predator response, with smaller raptors (which are presumably more dangerous) such as sharp-shinned hawks and small owls evoking a rather more aggressive response by chickadees. While usually the smallest avian prey selected by Cooper's hawks are various warblers (presumably taken mainly by male hawks), down to the size of the 7 g (0.25 oz) Wilson's warbler (Cardellina pusilla), even smaller passerines are known to be hunted. The smallest known avian prey species have included the 6.8 g (0.24 oz) verdin (Auriparus flaviceps), the 6.3 g (0.22 oz) ruby-crowned kinglet (Corthylio calendula) and the 5.3 g (0.19 oz) bushtit (Psaltriparus minimus). Even smaller birds, the hummingbirds, are essentially immune to Cooper's hawks (due to their own extreme agility) and were seen to incidentally benefit from nesting close to the hawks in California, due to a low risk of predators approaching while the hawks are present.

==== Columbids and woodpeckers ====
Cooper's hawk eating a bird, likely a mourning dove, in New York City

Outside of passerines, almost certainly the most important avian prey type is the pigeon and dove family. Especially for those living in urban areas, Cooper's hawks have seemed to take to living heavily off of doves, particularly the abundant and widely found mourning dove (Zenaida macroura), at 119 g (4.2 oz). Mourning doves appear to be hunted regularly in almost any part of the two species' mutual range.

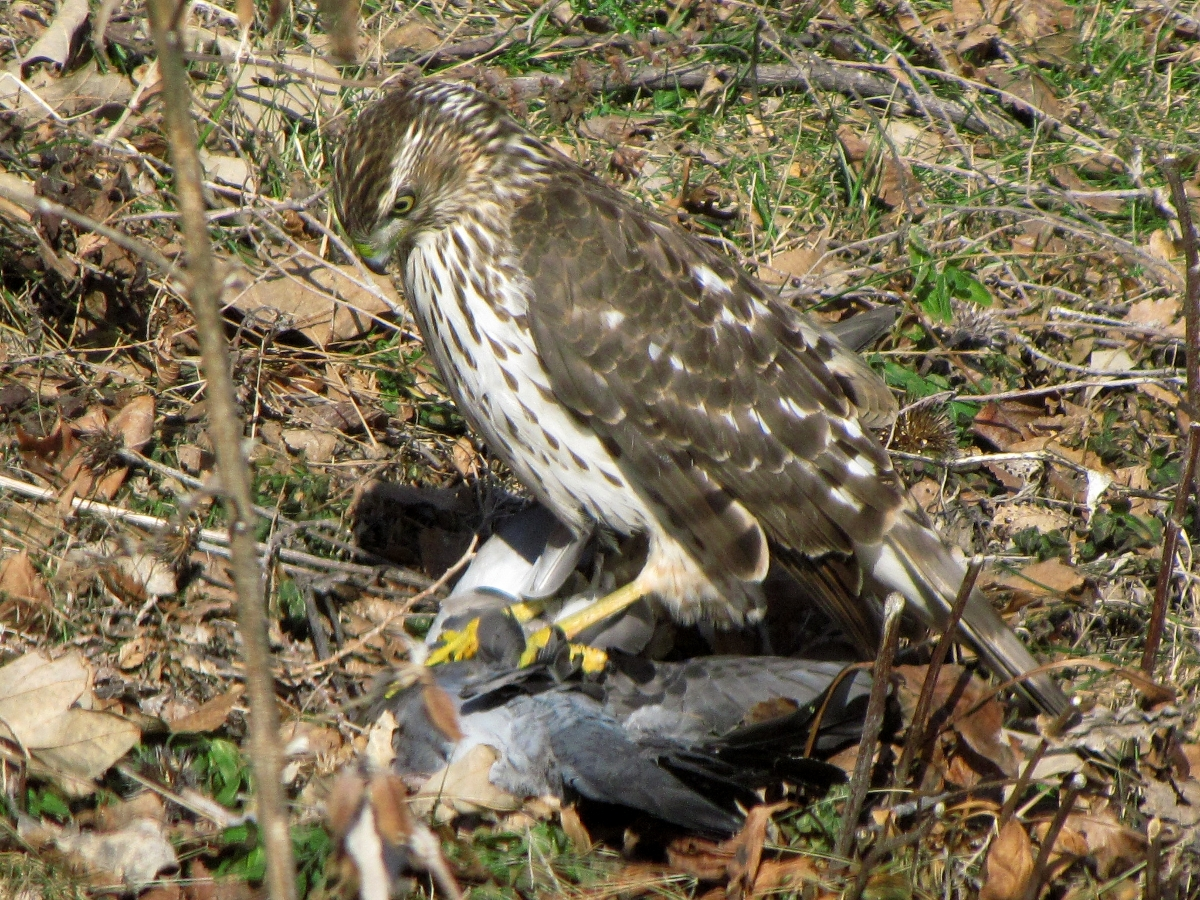
An immature Cooper's hawk who has caught a pigeon

Another popular prey family is the woodpeckers. A rather numerous and widely distributed species, the 132 g (4.7 oz) northern flicker (Colaptes auratus), is a particular dietary staple of Cooper's hawks, being about the third most widely reported prey species. The flicker was the main prey in northern New Mexico, at 22.5% of 316 prey items, and in southern Wisconsin, at 22% of 77 prey items. Flickers are common prey elsewhere as well, such as in Ithaca, New York. Medium-sized woodpeckers, such as red-headed woodpeckers (Melanerpes erythrocephalus) and red-bellied woodpeckers (Melanerpes carolinus) were important secondary prey in different parts of the range. In South Carolina, it was found that 15% of the red-headed woodpeckers in a study population were killed by hawks. All told, about 20 species (almost all in North America but for a couple poorly studied species) of woodpecker are known to be taken, ranging from the smallest, the 25.6 g (0.90 oz) downy woodpecker (Dryobates pubescens), to the largest, the 287 g (10.1 oz) pileated woodpecker (Dryocopus pileatus). The response of woodpeckers to a sighted Cooper's hawks varies, with evidence showing that downy woodpecker and flickers would behave more boldly and themselves may scold the hawk if part of a mixed flock but, if alone, the woodpecker will typically try to flee. Despite the regularity of predation of woodpeckers that are in the open, a study in British Columbia shows indicated Cooper's hawks seldom prey upon woodpecker nests, perhaps due to being unable to access their secluded, smallish nest holes, with the study showing that the most regular predators of such nests were various mammals (from deermice to bears).

==== Galliforms ====
Certainly the most controversial aspect of Cooper's hawks are their predations upon galliforms. By far the most regularly selected types are New World quail. Coveys of quail that attempt to evade predators by running into thick vegetation (which can allow them to successfully escape many predators) often find that Cooper's hawks are undeterred by this, as the hawks may chase them either on the wing or on foot into thickets. However, one grouse was seen to successfully evade a hunting Cooper's hawk by diving belly first into about a foot of snow. Cooper's hawks are often regarded as perhaps the most regular natural predator of northern bobwhites (Colinus virginianus). Indeed, the rate of predation by Cooper's does appear to exceed that committed by other species of hawk as well as that by large owls. For instance, during winter in Wisconsin, Cooper's hawks were thought to kill 3.4–12.5% of the local bobwhite population. However, the bobwhite appears to be a secondary prey species in all known studies and no evidence shows that Cooper's hawk predation alone can deplete bobwhite populations, unlike causes directly contributable to man such as overhunting and habitat destruction. In Washington, female Cooper's hawks took many California quails (Callipepla californica), which constitute an estimated 47% of the prey selected by female hawks, but the impact was too small to affect the quail's overall population. In the rural areas outside of Tucson, Gambel's quail (Callipepla gambelii) were found to be the most regularly selected prey species, at 15.2% of 79 prey items. A study of pellets in northwestern Mexico to determine if the local Cooper's hawks were regularly taking Montezuma quail (Cyrtonyx montezumae), finding that only one pellet consisted entirely of quail, the other pellets showing that hawks were mainly taking other prey, mostly doves. Most regularly found galliforms in North America (including well-established exotics such as chukars (Alectoris chukar) and common pheasants (Phasianus colchicus)) are known to fall prey occasionally to Cooper's hawks. These include assorted native grouse, including even the grassland-dwelling species (but excluding the more northerly distributed ptarmigans). Juveniles usually are the more vulnerable and more regularly taken of non-quail galliforms by Cooper's hawks, but the hawks can take adults quite regularly despite the prey's relatively large size. Adult ruffed grouse (Bonasa umbellus), weighing an estimated mean of 619 g (1.365 lb) when taken, are not infrequently exploited as prey, while adult sooty grouse (Dendragapus fuliginosus), estimated to weigh 1,050 g (2.31 lb) when taken have also been known to be taken repeatedly. Adult male sharp-tailed grouse (Tympanuchus phasianellus), which average 1,031 g (2.273 lb), are also known have been successfully preyed upon by Cooper's hawks. Even more impressive accounts show adult common pheasant estimated to weigh up to 1,158 g (2.553 lb) can be preyed upon by Cooper's hawks. One wild turkey (Meleagris gallopavo) taken in Florida was cited with a weight of 5,336 g (11.764 lb), which is the size of an adult. However, given that this is of enormous size relative to a Cooper's hawk, it would require verification that the turkey was this large and was taken alive by the hawk. Not unexpectedly, turkey poults are known to fall prey to Cooper's hawks.

==== Other birds ====
Beyond aforementioned families and orders, other types of birds are taken relatively infrequently. Usually moderate to low numbers of water birds are taken of any variety. About 5 species each of duck and heron, a dozen species of shorebird and a smaller assortment of grebes and rails are known in the prey spectrum. Even among water birds, nonetheless, a wide diversity may be taken, from the tiny 22.9 g (0.81 oz) least sandpiper (Calidris minutilla) to an adult mallard (Anas platyrhynchos) estimated to weigh 1,150 g (2.54 lb) when taken. Adult ducks and herons of roughly equal weight to Cooper's hawks and other largish adult water birds including ring-billed gulls (Larus delewarensis) and American coots (Fulica americana) are sometimes tackled by these hawks. Particularly frequency was recorded of 312.7 g (11.03 oz) western cattle egrets (Ardea ibis) in north Florida, where the egrets were the fourth most regularly recorded prey species. Assorted families of land birds are fairly rare as reported in food studies, including some nightjars, trogons, swifts, kingfishers, parrots and assorted other raptorial birds.

=== Mammals ===
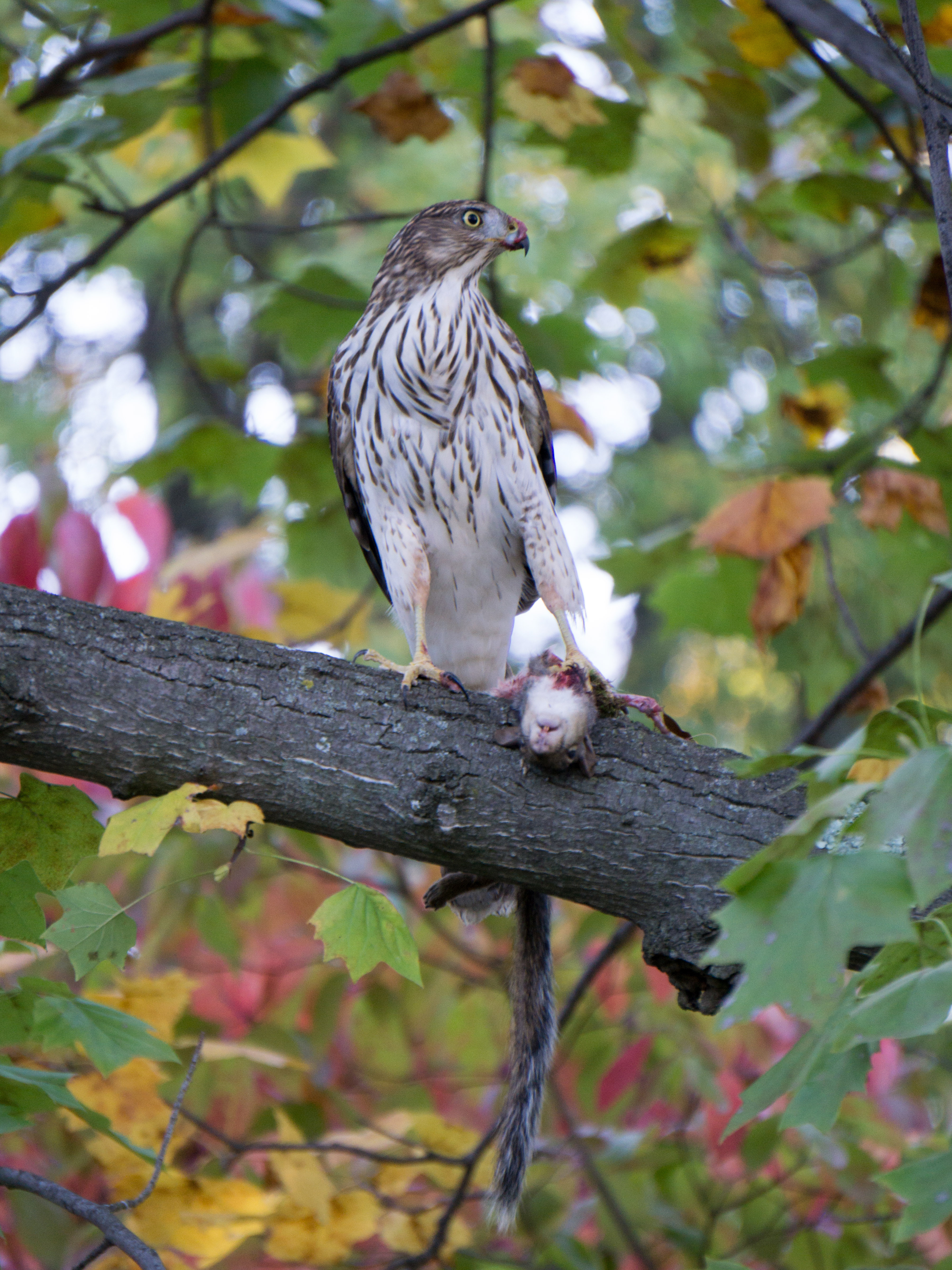
A tree squirrel is an ample meal for a juvenile Cooper's hawk

A lower diversity of species and lower overall numbers of mammals are taken relative to bird prey but mammalian prey can be locally important. Chipmunks are often regularly hunted in various regions, though only about one-third of North American chipmunks are known in the prey spectrum. High balances of the relatively large 96 g (3.4 oz) eastern chipmunk (Tamias striatus) were found in studies from New York, Michigan and Wisconsin. The eastern chipmunk appeared to dominate the foods of Cooper's hawks in the Green Ridge State Forest in Maryland, at 49.1% of 57 prey items and mammals altogether made up an exceptional 66.9% of the foods. In the western United States, fewer chipmunks are identifiable but such prey is fairly commonly detected. High balances of chipmunks were found in food studies from Oregon, especially in eastern Oregon where chipmunks (unidentified to species) were the leading prey type, at 22.5% of 120 prey items. The most common chipmunk prey in Oregon is probably the 89.3 g (3.15 oz) Townsend's chipmunk (Neotamias townsendii) but Cooper's hawks may take chipmunks down to the size of the 48 g (1.7 oz) least chipmunk (Neotamias minimus). Mammals distantly related to chipmunks, such as ground squirrels (including antelope squirrels) can be taken in locally high volume. Golden-mantled ground squirrels (Callospermophilus lateralis) were the second most important prey in eastern Oregon at 16.6%. Thirteen-lined ground squirrels (Ictidomys tridecemlineatus) were the second most common prey species in a study from Wisconsin and also important in the diet in North Dakota (where they were the most significant contributor of biomass, constituting 23.4%). Golden-mantled and thirteen-lined ground squirrels are fairly small for ground squirrels, the earlier averaging 166 g (5.9 oz), the latter of similar size. A few larger ground squirrels may be hunted, such as California ground squirrels (Otospermophilus beecheyi) and rock squirrels (Otospermophilus variegatus), both averaging over 600 g (1.3 lb) in adults, albeit infrequently. Tree squirrels are widely taken but secondary prey for Cooper's hawks. The smallish, roughly 200 g (7.1 oz) American red squirrel (Tamiasciurus hudsonicus) are not infrequent prey in northerly locations. About 36 red squirrels were recorded in the foods of Cooper's hawk in Ithaca, New York and these squirrels appear to have specific alarm calls that are provoked by these hawks, however the rate of predation by Cooper's appears to be low relative to other predators overall. Reported when taking red squirrels, male Cooper's hawks, being relatively small, may tear the prey into pieces that can be transported by them to the nest. Numerous other tree squirrels are taken occasionally by Cooper's hawks. Sizes of tree squirrels taken by Cooper's hawks were studied in Missouri. Eastern gray squirrels (Sciurus carolinensis) were taken of up to adult size but fox squirrels (Sciurus niger) were only taken as juveniles, as the adults, sometimes scaling up to 1,350 g (2.98 lb), were apparently too formidable for Cooper's. The estimated weights of both the gray and fox squirrels taken in Missouri was 450 g (16 oz), with the gray contributing 10.9% of the biomass.

About 20 non-sciurid rodent species may be taken by Coopers hawks but are rarely significant in the foods. Both American species of flying squirrels, woodrats, commoner Peromyscus mice, some species of vole and lemming, cotton rats, jumping mice, kangaroo rats and non-native rodents may all be prey occasionally, although most species of these are fairly nocturnal and thus of limited access. Few of these types of rodents are taken frequently enough to warrant much individual mention. Unidentified woodrats, at a mean estimated mass of 256.6 g (9.05 oz) were significant to the biomass of Cooper's hawks in northwestern Oregon. In North Dakota, Peromyscus mice made up an unusually high 13.5% of the foods. In the city of Burnaby, when bird feeders began to attract black rats (Rattus rattus), Cooper's hawk's came to locally take significant numbers of both young and adult rats. The first verified predation by a Cooper's hawk on a brown rat (Rattus norvegicus) was recently reported, also in British Columbia. One broad study found a somewhat unexpected correlation was found positively relating the previous summer's rodent density to the number of Cooper's hawks. This could be coincidental as rodent populations are probably driven by acorn production in the year prior to the rodent increases, and many of the birds taken regularly by Cooper's are also partially acorn dependent. Occasionally, Cooper's hawks may capture profitable mammalian prey such as rabbits and hares. Mainly, predation has been reported on the cottontail rabbits. Strong numbers of mountain cottontail (Sylvilagus nuttallii), averaging about 716 g (1.579 lb) when taken, were reported in northwestern Oregon (7.82% and fifth most regular prey species). In the rural vicinity of Tucson, cottontail rabbits were the second most regularly selected type of prey, at 12.7%. Fairly strong numbers of cottontails were also reported in New Mexico and Durango. In Missouri, the widely found eastern cottontail (Sylvilagus floridanus) was the most significant contributor of biomass, making up 14.5% of the total biomass. On average, in Missouri, the body mass of eastern cottontails caught was 600 g (1.3 lb), indicating juvenile eastern cottontails are usually caught. However, there are several known cases of adult eastern cottontails falling prey to Cooper's hawks, including cottontails estimated to weigh from 1,100 to 1,290 g (2.43 to 2.84 lb). Various species of non-cottontail leporids may occasionally be caught, including young black-tailed jackrabbits (Lepus californicus), pygmy rabbits (Brachylagus idahoensis) as well as fairly large numbers of feral European rabbits (Oryctolagus cuniculus) in Victoria, British Columbia.

Mammals of other orders are taken quite infrequently, with a low volume of shrews and moles reported. Cooper's hawks are considered a potential predator of the smaller species of weasel and were recorded in Florida to kill a striped skunk (Mephitis mephitis) kit estimated to weigh about 661 g (1.457 lb). Occasionally, Cooper's hawks are known to hunt bats. They are said to usually capture bats on the wing rather than search them out. Findings were that in Carlsbad Caverns that Cooper's (and also sharp-shinned) hawks were the most efficient avian predators of bats near the cave entrance (rating as more successful than most Buteo hawks and particularly more so than larger and less agile raptors like red-tailed hawks and large owls). Per observation in Carlsbad, due to their agility, Cooper's can match the evasive flight of a bat and may be successful in about 90% of observed pursuits. Apart from their well-documented predation of Mexican free-tailed bats (Tadarida brasiliensis), quite little is known about which bat species Cooper's hawk's may prey upon and at what level do the local hawks depend on such prey. Apart from caves, sometimes Cooper's hawks have been seen to capture bats in urbanized areas.

=== Other prey ===
In some areas, respectable numbers of reptiles may be hunted. All told, nearly 30 species of reptile may be hunted by Cooper's hawks. In the eastern part of the range, even in biodiverse locations for reptilian species such as Florida, a very low volume of such prey are reportedly taken by Cooper's hawks. In Arkansas, a small sample of road-killed Cooper's hawks showed that small reptiles were more common than birds amongst the stomach contents, with Bougainville's skinks (Lerista bougainvillii) and ring-necked snakes (Diadophis punctatus) constituting about 40% of the diet. Strong detection of reptilian prey is known in more western locations, especially farther south. In fact, of avian predators in one Californian study's estimation, Cooper's hawks showed the most reliance on lizards locally, but that Cooper's was not locally common in the study area so had relatively limited impact. In California, it was found that 69% of the diet was reptiles, most of which were assorted lizards (led by whiptail lizards, nearly 2.8 kg (6.2 lb) of which were estimated to be found in one nest). In rural areas outside of Tucson, a fairly strong presence of (unidentified to species) spiny lizards, at 13% of 77 prey items, although overall in all areas of the Tucson metropolitan, reptiles constituted a lower 8% of the total 228 prey items. In Durango, reptiles were a pronounced part of Cooper's hawk diet. Here, the most frequently identified prey species was the Mexican Plateau horned lizard (Phrynosoma orbiculare) (11.5% of 191 prey items), followed by the northern flicker and thirdly the crevice spiny lizard (Sceloporus poinsettii) (10.47%, plus other unidentified spiny lizards making up a further 4.2% of the diet). In Arizona, spiny lizards were similarly detected to have a strong prey-predator relationship with Cooper's hawks as well. Most lizards encountered and hunted by Cooper's hawks are fairly small but, despite being more scarcely selected, snake prey may show greater size variation. Snakes known to be taken have ranged in size from the 6 g (0.21 oz) redbelly snake (Storeria occipitomaculata) to the a young black rat snake (Pantherophis obsoletus), estimated to weigh 200 g (7.1 oz), and the gopher snake (Pituophis catenifer) (adults of the latter two snake species can average roughly 890 g (1.96 lb) for both species and may be too formidable for these hawks). Unlike with reptiles, there is little evidence that Cooper's hawk regularly hunts amphibians in any area, despite a few species being known in the prey spectrum. While some authors have posited that as much as 2.1% of Cooper's hawks' global prey consists of invertebrates, prevailing food studies tend to find scant to none evidence of such prey; however, a truly exceptional case of Cooper's hawks found dead in Arkansas showed that beetles and moths/butterflies each represented 12.5% of detected prey items.

=== Interspecific predatory relationships ===
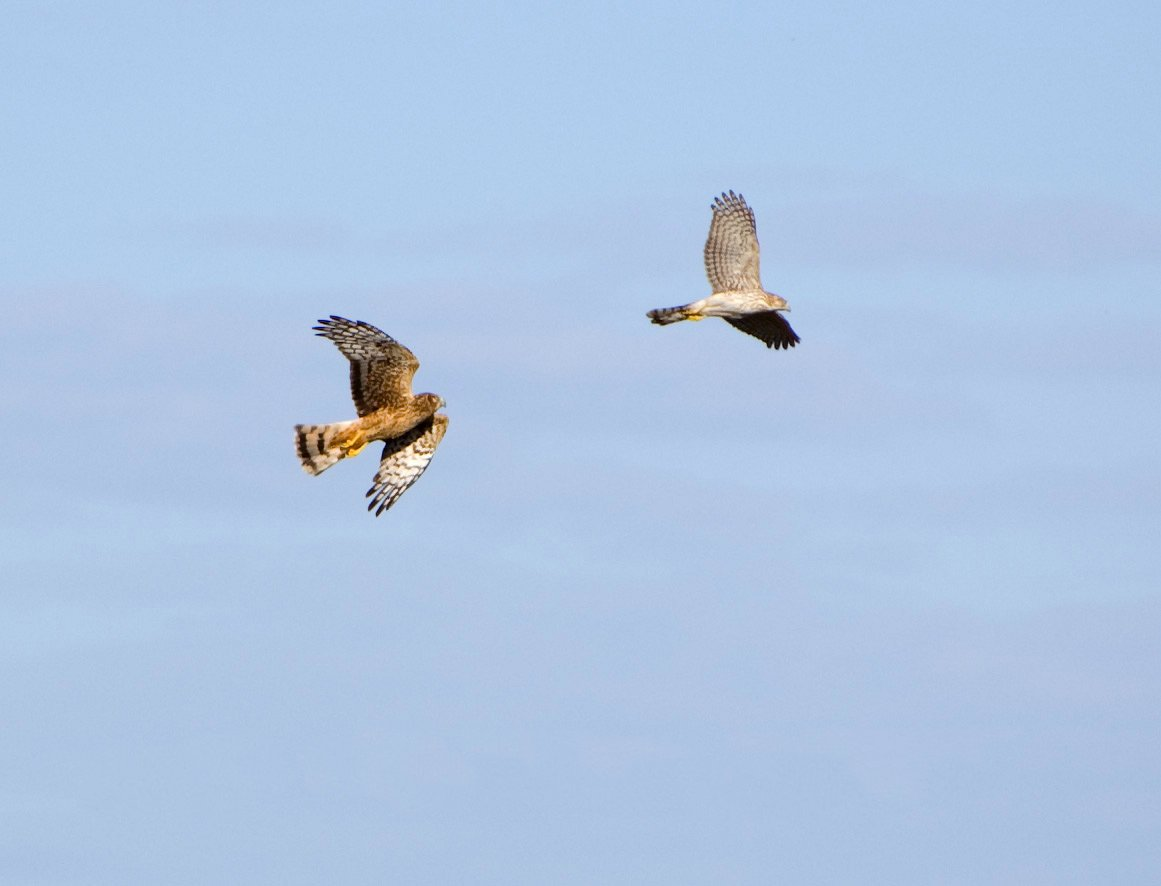
Other raptors can be intolerant of sharing resources with Cooper's hawks, the likely reason this northern harrier is chasing this young Cooper's hawk.

Of special interest is how Cooper's hawks live alongside sharp-shinned hawks and American goshawks. Little distinguishes outright the distribution, habitat, ecology and prey spectrum of sharp-shinned hawks from Cooper's hawks. Throughout the range of Cooper's hawk, sharp-shins may be found breeding, migrating and wintering in similar areas. So too is there much overlap between the ranges of Cooper's hawks and American goshawks, such as throughout southern Canada, the western United States, the Upper Midwest (and sometimes in the Northeastern United States) and during times of passage. In general, sharp-shinned hawks tend to use younger and denser stands of trees than do Cooper's. Meanwhile, goshawks tend to favor old-growth forest area with taller and older trees and generally lower tree densities. However, all three species prefer fairly enclosed canopies over their nesting areas, i.e. canopy coverage are generally thought to need to be at least at 60–70%. A particular opportunity was taken to study the three hawks' ecology when living near one another in Oregon. Unusually, nests were not consistently well spaced between the species, and 2 sharp-shin nests were approximately 300 m (980 ft) from active Cooper's nests, while 5 Cooper's nests were 300 to 450 m (980 to 1,480 ft) from active goshawk nests. However, the patch habitat and dietary behavior of each species was still fairly partitioned. Here, for sharp-shinned hawks, the tree stands averaged 22–50 years old and had a mean density of 1180 trees per hectare (ha), while Cooper's stands averaged 30–70 years old and had a mean of 907 trees per ha while the goshawk used in oldest and most open stands, with trees of an average age of 150 years, and a mean of 482 trees per ha. The data from the Jemez Mountains of New Mexico was largely corresponding with the goshawk occurring in areas with a median of 781 trees per ha, Cooper's in areas with a median of 1229 trees per ha and the sharp-shins in a median of 1482 tree per ha. In the New Mexico data, goshawks used the largest trees with the lowest median canopy coverage (77.4% vs 78.4% for Cooper' s and 83.1% for sharp-shins). In a study from northern Utah, Cooper's hawks were intermediate in most habitat characteristics, being at median elevation (1,782 m (5,846 ft)), nest height (8 m (26 ft) against 6 m (20 ft) for sharp-shins and 12 m (39 ft) for goshawk) and in areas of intermediate branch density. However, Cooper's nests were the closest in Utah to areas disturbed by humans (147 m (482 ft) against 161 m (528 ft) for sharp-shinned and 250 m (820 ft) for goshawk), also closest to water (220 m (720 ft) against 444 m (1,457 ft) in sharp-shins and 394 m (1,293 ft) for goshawk). There is often some level of distinction in habitat between Cooper's and the sharp-shinned hawk. Compared to sharp-shinned hawks in Wisconsin and Oregon, Cooper's hawks use woods with fewer conifers, less dense stands of trees and stands with taller trees. Often, sharp-shinned hawk nests are lower in the trees and placed in much denser vegetation (often even the sharp-shins with their smaller frames themselves accidentally strike against branches while attempting to enter the nest), to hide the nest more sufficiently against predators. The habitat used by the two species in Missouri was less distinct (i.e. similar tree species used). However, the sharp-shinned hawk nests in Missouri were at much higher elevations, i.e. 343 m (1,125 ft) above sea level, than those of Cooper's (which were at a mean elevation of 151.3 m (496 ft); more surprisingly the stand density was higher here for Cooper's, at a mean of 935.7 trees per ha than those used by sharp-shins, at a mean of 599.3 trees per ha. There was some level of temporal differences between the two species in study in Indiana, where Cooper's hawks were generally active in the early morning but sharp-shinned hawks did not become active until later in the morning (hypothetically to avoid more severe intraguild predation by large owls due to its smaller size). In northern New Jersey, compared to nesting goshawks, Cooper's hawks used flatter lands that were closer to roads, other openings and human habitations. However, canopy coverage averaged high in New Jersey data for Cooper's, at 89.1%.

Cooper's hawk has a mean home range size that was comparable to the roughly half as large-bodied Eurasian sparrowhawk, at 1,190 ha (2,900 acres) for Cooper's and 835 ha (2,060 acres) for the sparrowhawk. However, data shows that in North America, the home range size of Accipiter and Astur species corresponded to the birds' body size, i.e. 2,600 ha (6,400 acres) mean for the goshawk and 458 ha (1,130 acres) mean for the sharp-shinned hawk. The aforementioned Oregon studies also studied at length the dietary differences between the three American Accipiter/Astur hawk species. Cooper's hawks prey sizes were intermediate in keeping with body size, at around 135 g (4.8 oz) versus a mean prey size of 306.6 g (10.81 oz) for the goshawk in eastern Oregon and 12.8 and 28.4 g (0.45 and 1.00 oz) for sharp-shins in northwestern and eastern Oregon, respectively. The amount of mammals in the diet in Oregon also increased with the body size of the species. The diets of the three species were also studied in the Chiricahua Mountains of Arizona. There was some diet overlap in preferred prey for Cooper's hawks with both the sharp-shinned hawk and the American goshawk. In the case of the goshawk and Cooper's, both hawks regularly took Steller's jays and band-tailed pigeons (Patagioenas fasciata). With the sharp-shinned hawk, Cooper's locally also shared a liking for American robins and black-headed grosbeaks (Pheucticus melanocephalus). However, unlike either the sharp-shinned hawk or the goshawk in the Chiricahuas, Cooper's hawks regularly took chipmunks and lizards as well. Furthermore, the nests of Cooper's and goshawks were fairly evenly spaced, at about 1.6 km (0.99 mi) apart, indicating that they maintain exclusive territories (almost as if within the same species), while sharp-shinned hawk nests were closer to goshawk nests but in much denser habitats. When chickens were experimentally exposed to each of the three American Accipiters, they reacted the most aggressively to the sharp-shinned hawk (as they pose little to no threat to adult poultry), intermediately to Cooper's and with strong attempts to evade and escape when exposed to the goshawk, which is very capable and ready to dispatch adult poultry. Many studies have contrasted the diet of Cooper's and sharp-shinned hawk in other areas as well, with the sharp-shinned hawk much more regularly selecting birds weighing under about 28 g (0.99 oz), a fair amount overlap in birds of 28 to 40 g (0.99 to 1.41 oz) and 40 to 75 g (1.4 to 2.6 oz) weight classes but birds over this weight range are increasingly more often taken almost exclusively by Cooper's. Also, the sharp-shinned hawk appears to hunt more so birds that dwell at the canopy level in the woodlands (as opposed to ground to shrub height-dwelling birds) within the forest and prefers to attack in heavier cover than Cooper's seemingly.

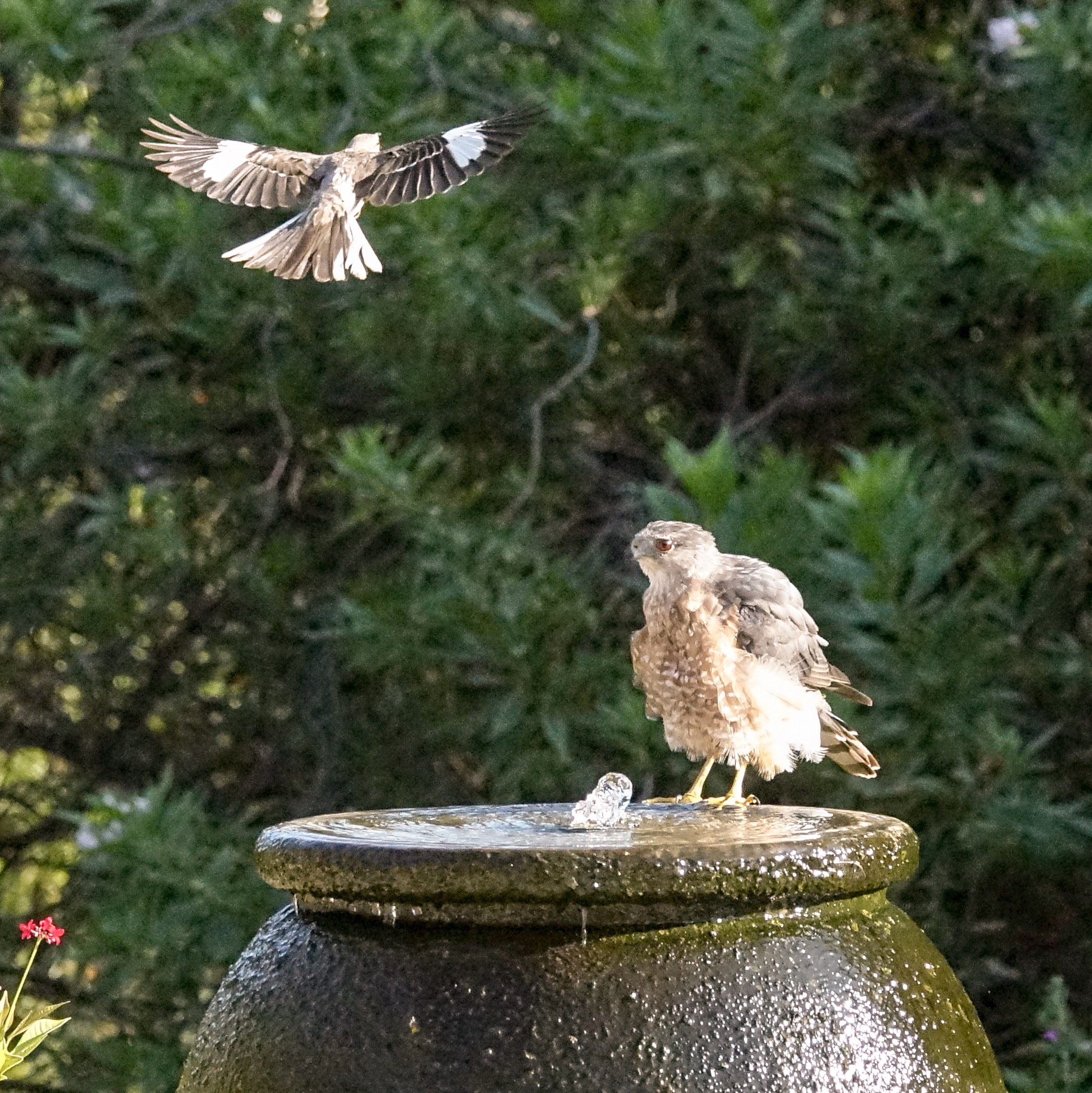
A mockingbird flying in to dive-bomb a Cooper's hawk

The ecology of Cooper's hawks has also been studied in contrast to other diurnal raptors as well. In the raptor guild within southern Michigan, the overall food breadth and size was studied against red-tailed hawks, red-shouldered hawks and American kestrels. Here, although the food niche breadth (mean number of prey species per study site) of Cooper's was relatively low at 1.79, Cooper's hawk had the largest mean prey sizes at 67.4 g (2.38 oz), which was considerably higher than even the much larger red-tailed hawk (mean prey mass of 43.4 g (1.53 oz)). In southern Wisconsin, the food niche breadth was rather higher for Cooper's at 6.9 and the mean prey mass, at 109.9 g (3.88 oz), was second only to the red-tailed hawk's. In the Wisconsin data, the red-shouldered, the broad-winged and rough-legged hawks (Buteo lagopus) as well as the northern harrier, peregrine falcon (Falco peregrinus) and the American kestrel all had lower mean prey masses. Much farther south in Durango, Mexico, while there was overlap in the class of prey selected by Cooper's hawks with the other studied raptor species, American kestrels, red-tailed and zone-tailed hawks (Buteo albonotatus), there was minimal overlap in which prey species were usually selected, especially given the difference in habitat usage. Furthermore, in Durango, while Cooper's and the Buteo hawks all took appreciable numbers of adult cotton rats, kestrels selected only young cotton rats. In a study in western Maryland, Cooper's hawks used more mature woodland with a more developed understory and more extensive ground cover than the other woodland nesting hawks, the broad-winged and red-shouldered hawks. While red-tailed hawks nested fairly high in the Maryland data in isolated pines somewhat out of the interior forest, Cooper's nests were at similar height in forest and slightly higher than those of red-shouldered hawks and much higher than those of broad-winged hawks. In what was probably a case of defense of their hunting ground, a female Cooper's hawk was recorded to attack and drive off (without physical contact) a larger peregrine falcon from a perch during winter in Ontario.

Cooper's hawk is usually a top predator in the daytime but is not immune from attack by other predators. The most common predator of this species is almost certainly the great horned owl (Bubo virginianus). This rather large owl (averaging more than three times heavier than a Cooper's hawk) is known to regularly track down fledglings and adults as well as raid the nests of other birds of prey. Many records show great horned owls will visit the nests of birds of prey and pick off the young nightly until the prey resource is exhausted (i.e. all young or sometimes adult birds of prey are killed). Furthermore, given the opportunity, great horned owls readily expropriate the nests built by the raptors they kill as their own. Given its preference for secluded wooded spots near woodland openings, Cooper's hawks are frequently the subject of unwanted attention from horned owls. Both the young, especially around the time they leave the nest or are recently fledged, and adult Cooper's hawks are vulnerable to these owls. While little data has been collected on the overall effect great horned owls have on Cooper's hawk populations, it is known that for the larger, more formidable goshawk that as many as 40% of radiotagged juveniles within a study appeared to meet their demise via horned owls. Due to their threat level, the calls of great horned owls provoke a strong response from Cooper's hawks and banders and researchers usually use stimuli of great horned owls to attract a mobbing Cooper's hawks. Reportedly, Cooper's hawks will temporarily tolerate and possibly even cooperate with crows when one or the other spots a great horned owl in the daytime, both species appearing to join forces to mob the threatening owl out of the vicinity. In one case, after a great horned owl pair failed to successfully breed in a nest built by other Cooper's hawks, a pair of Cooper's who tried to nest was supplanted by horned owls, possibly of the same pair who had previously failed.

Other natural predators of Cooper's hawks that are known are mainly larger diurnal birds of prey. In some cases, their larger cousins, American goshawks, will prey on Cooper's hawks. Widely but somewhat scarcely, red-tailed hawks have been known to prey on Cooper's hawk, while a single instance is known of a Cooper's falling prey to a golden eagle (Aquila chrysaetos). Less is known about the range of nest predators. Among all known predators, only the raccoon (Procyon lotor) can be considered to rival the great horned owl as the most severe threat to nesting attempts, probably consuming mostly nestlings and eggs but also perhaps some older hawks. American crows are known to rob nests of Cooper's hawks as well, especially when the parents have been displaced by the crow's severe mobbing. Smaller diurnal birds of prey are, in turn, threatened by Cooper's hawks. This is especially the case with the American kestrel. After some regional declines, a radiotagging study in Pennsylvania found that of 19 kestrels, 26% were killed by avian predators, with the suspected culprit in a majority of the cases being Cooper's hawks. Some resources have gone as far as to blame the kestrels decline directly on Cooper's hawk predation but subsequent data from the U.S. Breeding Bird Survey and the National Audubon Society Christmas Bird Count appear to discount this theory, instead linking the overall declines to inadvertent human causes. Cooper's hawk are also counted as a predator of merlins (Falco columbarius). The only confirmed accipitrid that Cooper's hawk have been known to prey upon is their smaller cousins, the sharp-shinned hawks. However, in the southeast, Cooper's hawks was counted among the potential, but not yet confirmed, predators of swallow-tailed kites (Elanoides forficatus) and nesting kites appear to engage in anti-predator behavior towards Cooper's hawks. Furthermore, Cooper's hawks that came into the vicinity were considered potential predators and mobbed as such by nesting gray hawks.

Even more so than diurnal raptors, a wide diversity of owls are known to fall prey to Cooper's hawks. Despite the temporal differences of their activity, the intensive hunting methods of Cooper's hawks may allow them to access roosting owls more readily than other types of hawks. Small owls that Cooper's hawk have been known to prey upon have included flammulated owls (Psiloscops flammeolus), eastern screech-owls (Megascops asio), western screech-owls (Megascops kennicottii), whiskered screech-owl (Megascops trichopsis), elf owl (Micrathene whitneyi), northern pygmy owl (Glaucidium gnoma), ferruginous pygmy owl (Glaucidium brasilianum), burrowing owl (Athene cunicularia), boreal owl (Aegolius funereus) and northern saw-whet owl (Aegolius acadicus). Medium to large-sized owls are sometimes also prey for Cooper's hawks have been known to include long-eared owl (Asio otus) and perhaps the rather large spotted owl (Strix occidentalis). Most impressively, an instance was observed where a Cooper's hawk appeared to have preyed upon an adult of the rather larger (averaging about 787 g (1.735 lb)) barred owl (Strix varia). There is also a record of a barred owl preying on a Cooper's hawk as well.

== Breeding ==
=== Breeding territory and prelaying behavior ===
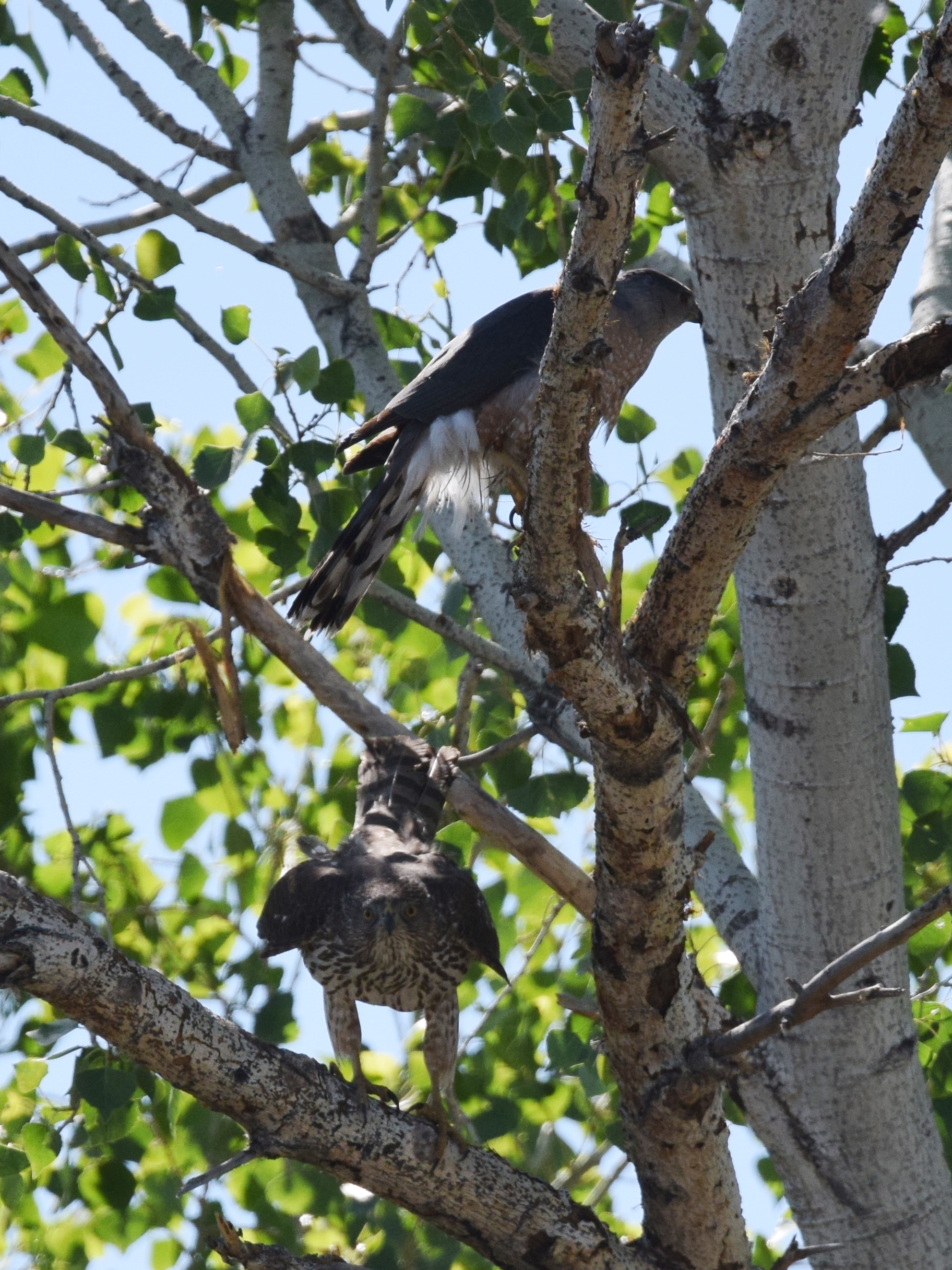
A breeding pair of Cooper's hawks, consisting of an adult male and an immature female.

Cooper's hawk is a solitary bird apart from breeding and rare aggregations during migration. This species usually is considered monogamous. However, pairings of two males (1 young, 1 adult) with a single female have been recorded at least three times. In Grand Forks, North Dakota, a single male has been recorded to successfully mate with two nearby females, with similar records from New Mexico. However, the breeding efforts in Grand Forks were found to be disproportionately producing males, seven to one. A Wisconsin study determined 19.3% of nestlings in a Milwaukee study area were from extra-pair couplings and that 34% of all broods included at least 1 extra-pair young. Despite their generally monogamous breeding system, Cooper's hawks are often rather inconsistent regarding breeding for life (as many other birds of prey do). While males are more or less devoted to same breeding sites throughout lifetime, 23% of adult females in Wisconsin moved to different nesting grounds from 0.8 to 14.6 km (0.50 to 9.07 mi) away, averaging 2.6 km (1.6 mi), in subsequent years. Meanwhile, in Arizona, 3% of males and 10% of females displayed yearly breeding dispersal. However, in the urbanized areas of Tucson, evidence indicates that mate fidelity is higher than elsewhere. In Tucson, it was found that the mean distance of the mated pairs was only 473.4 m (1,553 ft) during the non-breeding season and 36 interactions were recorded almost all in the core range, indicating an unusually close perennial typical pair bond here. The rate of dispersal to a different breeding ground was a much higher at 68% in north Florida.

Data in Wisconsin shows that pairs line up in correspondence with their size, i.e. larger female Cooper's hawks mate with large males and smaller females with smaller males. The data indicated that larger pairs tend to have earlier laying dates, larger broods and more recruits than smaller ones. Relatively large body mass may be a heritable trait. However, no correlation was found between the age of the pair and apparent breeding site quality and time of breeding or annual productivity (though older females may lay slightly earlier than yearlings in most cases). In Arizona, birds of each sex were found to usually pair with like-age individuals. Pairs frequently high circle together. Either sex or the pair together perform in courtship, sometimes over an open field. Courting usually occurs on bright, sunny days, in midmorning. During sky-dances by males, the wings are raised high over back in a wide arch with slow, rhythmic flapping, similar to the flight of a nighthawk, with exaggerated down strokes. Often, much like the American goshawk, the displaying male flares his undertail coverts. Sometimes frequently for a month or so, the pair will perform as such. When perching together, the male usually keeps on a perch at least 1 m (3.3 ft) away from his unpredictable larger mate. The bowing display reported in Wisconsin, usually (but not always) done by the male, may be a sign to the other mate of their readiness to nest build. Breeding may begin as early as February in the southern part of range, but, for the most part, the breeding season is from April to July. In central New York, the male arrives in nesting woods by March, initially defending an area of 100 m (330 ft) or so. Both members of pair arrive by early March in Wisconsin and, in both Pennsylvania and Wisconsin, nest building and copulation is often complete within the month of March. Generally both members of a pair remain on the breeding ground vicinity year-around in Arizona, New Mexico and even in British Columbia.

In Michigan, the density average was 1 pair per 1,554 ha (3,840 acres). In North Dakota, 10–12 pairs were found on 23,310 ha (57,600 acres). 1 nest per 734 ha (1,810 acres) in central Wisconsin, 1 nest per 2,321 ha (5,740 acres) in northwestern Oregon and 1 nest per 2,200 ha (5,400 acres) in eastern Oregon. Minimal distance between active nests is seldom less than 0.7 to 1 km (0.43 to 0.62 mi). Distance between active nest on average was 1.6 km (0.99 mi) in both California and Arizona, 2.4 km (1.5 mi) in New York, 1 km (0.62 mi) in Kansas, 5 km (3.1 mi) in western Oregon and 3.5 km (2.2 mi) in eastern Oregon and 1.6 km (0.99 mi) in central Wisconsin. Mean distance between active nests in Illinois was 5.3 km (3.3 mi). Rather small areas may be defended where hunting occurs near the nest. Typical home range sizes for Cooper's hawks are between 400 and 1,800 ha (990 and 4,450 acres). Home range for a Wisconsin male hawk is around 193 to 571 ha (480 to 1,410 acres) during breeding and about 732 ha (1,810 acres) during non-breeding. Exceptionally close active and successful nests were recorded only 160 m (520 ft) apart in Albuquerque and 270 m (890 ft) in Victoria, British Columbia. Male home ranges in Tucson (sample size 9) averaged 65.5 ha (162 acres), being smaller than in Wisconsin due to better prey concentrations (doves), however juvenile males in rural Tucson areas covered a home range of 771 ha (1,910 acres). Breeding hawks in Oshkosh, Wisconsin had an average home range of 238 ha (590 acres). In southwest Tennessee, a male Cooper's hawk had a home range size of 331 ha (820 acres) and 4 females had an average range of 869 ha (2,150 acres). Slightly smaller home ranges were found for urban males in a California study, at a mean of 481 ha (1,190 acres), than in non-developed areas here, which showed a mean of 609 ha (1,500 acres). Huge male home ranges were found for breeding ones in New Mexico, at 1,206 ha (2,980 acres), and in north Florida, at 1,460 ha (3,600 acres), probably due to dispersed prey resources. Home ranges of females tend to constrict with age. An exceptionally pronounced case of this was in north Florida, where first year female home ranges went from up to about 932 km^{2} (360 sq mi) down to as little as 4 km^{2} (1.5 sq mi). In central New York, the nest sites of various other woodland birds were surprisingly close to those of Cooper's hawks, though some of the nest were occupied by other birds of prey that are not regularly threatened by these hawks (though flickers, one of the birds most at threat by the hawks, were fairly dispersed away from the hawk's nests). As in most accipitrids, copulation is brief (averaging about 4.5 seconds) and frequent (at around 0.9 per hour), with total copulations averaging per season about 372.

=== Nest ===
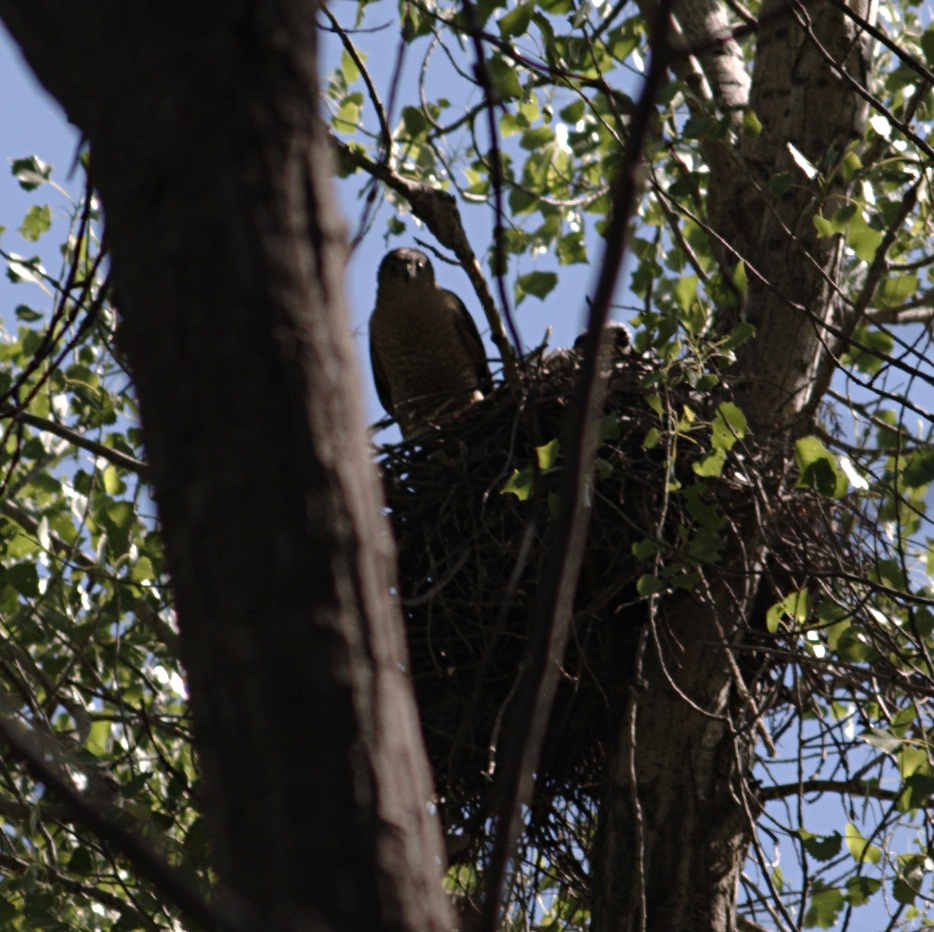
The large, bulky nest of a Cooper's hawk with the female perched on it.

This species builds a bulky platform nest, usually 61 to 76 cm (24 to 30 in) across and 15 to 45 cm (5.9 to 17.7 in) deep. Often the nest is shallower in conifers (i.e. 15 to 20 cm (5.9 to 7.9 in) deep in New York) and deeper in broad-leafed trees (averaging 43 cm (17 in) in New York). Nests average larger in the eastern part of the range than in the west, perhaps in keeping with the eastern hawks' larger average body sizes. While sticks are almost always used, one unusual Florida nest was observed to be made largely of Spanish moss (Tillandsia usneoides). Often nests are lined by Cooper's pair with bark or odd bits of greenery. The male grabs at bark like prey, while the female, if participating, may tear off bark with her bill; the piles of bark may be up to 3 inches deep by the time eggs are laid, though green spray is added considerably less often than other species of hawks such as Buteo. One male, unusually, was seen to be engaging in nest building while helping parent an active brood in mid-summer. Nest are often located at 8 to 15.1 m (26 to 50 ft) above the ground in the main fork or horizontal branch close to the trunk, though are sometimes up to 20 m (66 ft) above the ground, and in trees usually of 21 to 52 cm (8.3 to 20.5 in) in diameter. Usually nest sites are within plots of woodland of at least 4 to 8 ha (9.9 to 19.8 acres) in size, with a canopy coverage usually over 64%, but can be much smaller in some urban vicinities. One unusual nest in North Dakota was in dense shrub rather than a tree and it even successfully produced fledglings. Another unconventional nesting area in North Dakota in the Little Missouri National Grassland and was recorded to have unusually open canopy, at a mean of 55%, and to be in a rather steep sloped area. An unusual nest site in Wisconsin was on a grapevine. Water access is of secondary import. Pine plantations are popular nesting sites across several parts of the range. In Tucson, 70.8% of 48 nests were found to be non-native Eucalyptus trees. Native white pine (Pinus strobus) was preferred in Massachusetts, at 58% of 48 nests, and in Pennsylvania, at 78% of 18 studied nests, and the most used tree in a study from Wisconsin as well, at 35% of 82 nests. Shortleaf pine (Pinus echinata), another native was preferred in Missouri (at 51% of 43 nests) and in Illinois (at 81% of 16 nests). Deciduous trees may be preferred elsewhere in the east, such as American beech (Fagus grandifolia) in New York (39% of 36 nests), oaks in Maryland (66%) and laurel oak (Quercus laurifolia) in north Florida (81% of 77 nests). Douglas firs (Pseudotsuga menziesii) were preferred in northwest Oregon (94% of 18 nests) and also in northeast Oregon as well as in British Columbia (34% of 64 nests), often where mistletoe parasitizes the tree (64% of 31 in the overall state of Oregon were on mistletoe). Ponderosa pine (Pinus ponderosa) were preferred in eastern Oregon (53% of 15 nests) as well as in New Mexico. In the enormous redwood forests of California, all Cooper's hawk nests were in more modestly sized native tan-oaks (Notholithocarpus densiflorus).

It has historically taken to almost be a rule that Cooper's hawk uses a new nest site each year. Exceptionally, though, pairs have used the same nests for up to 4 years, though mostly records show up to 2 to 3 years of use when a nest is reused. As much as 59% of 17 nests (New Mexico) or 66.7% of 12 nests (southern Illinois) may be reused in the following year but this is not usual. In north Florida, 21% of nests were reused in a subsequent year, while in New York, it was around 10%. New nests are often near prior nests, at a mean distance between them of around 170 m (560 ft) in Wisconsin. In Alberta, a female was reported to use a grove of trees over two consecutive years as a nest site, be absent for one year and then returned to nest in the same grove the subsequent year. Nest building usually takes about two weeks. However, if a clutch is lost, a pair may repair and use another nest within four days. A majority of 385 nests (40–60% annually) in Wisconsin built on pre-existing structures. At times, the material is put on the residue of a crow's nest, squirrel's drey or even a woodrat tree nest. In Tucson, nest building was recorded during winter, exceptionally. When grass is found to be incorporated in nest structure, it is an indication that Cooper's is using a nest built by crows as they have never themselves been known to use grass. Oregon nests frequently incorporate mistletoe into the nest, more so those built by pairs with mature females rather than juvenile females. Their nest structure requires about 4.8 support branches. Data is conflicting on whether it is the male or the female who selects the nest site. Males were found to do 70% of the nest building in Wisconsin but the female does not consistently take a secondary role. Mostly, the male gathers nesting materials within 100 to 200 m (330 to 660 ft) of the nest. The male snaps off twigs with his feet to build with, though smaller twigs may be carried in the bill. After an early duet, at as early as 5:30, the male may start nest building at around 6:30. Later in the day, he will hunt, though females also hunt at this stage, much of her food is brought by him. South-facing nests are thought to be avoided, possibly due to solar irradiance reducing soil moisture, tree density and shading or possibly due to the more deciduous local nature of north-facing nest sites. When using a prior years nest, the female reportedly selects and repairs it.

=== Eggs ===
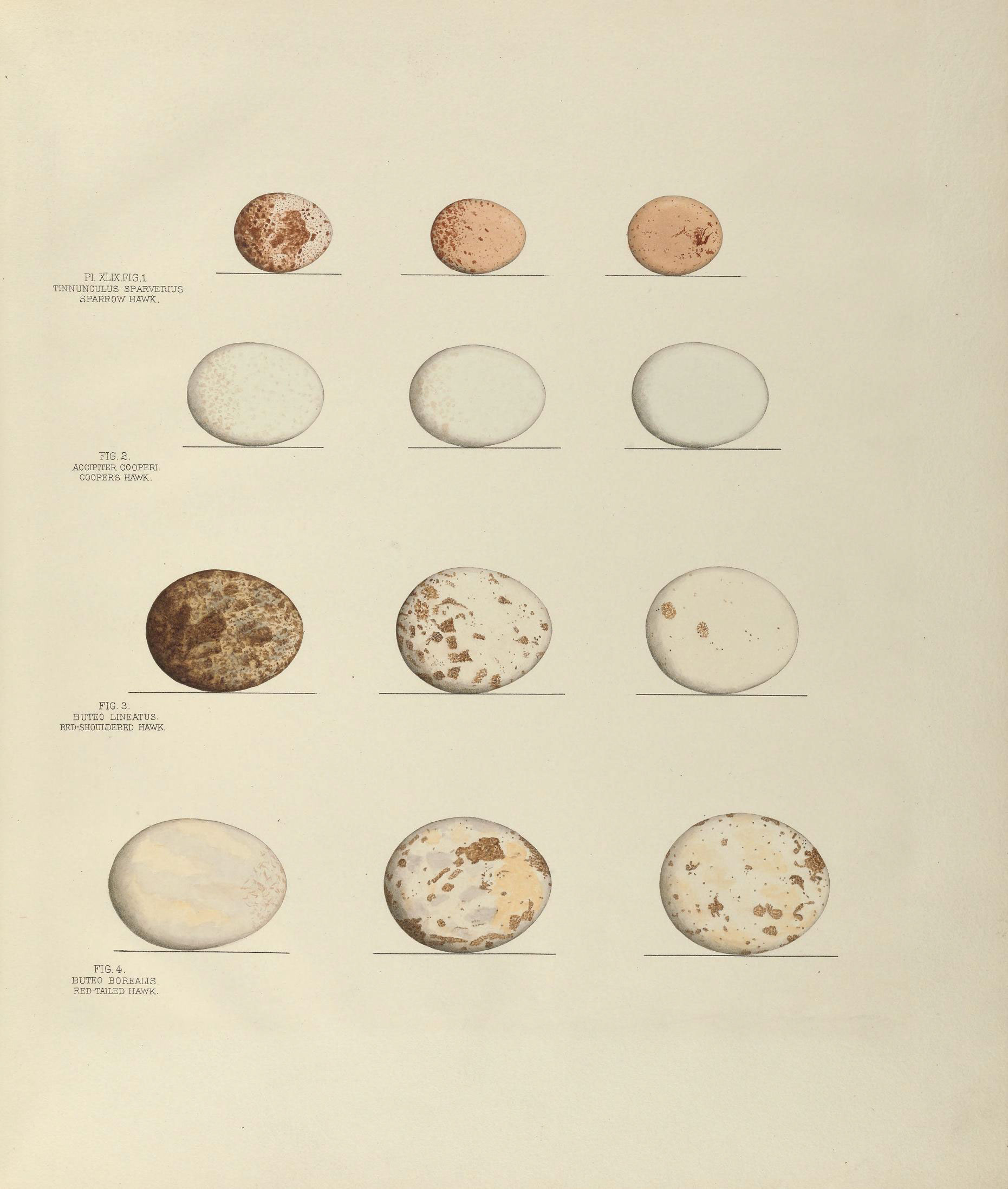
The second row shows the unmarked eggs of Cooper's hawks, compared to those of American kestrels (line 1), red-shouldered hawks (line 3) and red-tailed hawks (line 4).

Egg laying in New York is between after April 24 to June 26 (about 50% from May 10 to 20) with similar dates in New England and also from Ohio to Minnesota. Similar laying dates were also found for Ontario as well as in British Columbia, but more laying date variation was found for the latter province. Data shows that mean egg laying times in Wisconsin may be shifting earlier by up to 4–5 days in different years, but the current mean is 1.3 days. Similar shifts may be occurring in New York state as well. From New Jersey to Virginia, egg laying may be from April 7 to May 23 (about 52% from April 29 to May 11), with similar dates on the opposite coast, from Washington state to California. From Florida to Baja California, egg-laying can began as early February, but, despite the lower latitude, known records show most are between mid-April and early May and can even run into June. Similar egg-laying dates, peaking around late April, are known in Arizona. The mean clutch initiation, in 57 clutches from North Dakota was mid-May and, though pairs arrive more than a month before that, the mean dates are consistently 2–3 weeks later in nests at other similar latitude in British Columbia and Wisconsin. It was determined in Maryland that egg-laying and other mean dates rival or are even later than the longer distance migrating broad-winged hawk, and are much later in general than other Buteo hawks here. Dates of egg laying and other behaviors were also found to average slightly later than the even further migrating Buteo, the Swainson's hawk (Buteo swainsonii). The clutch size averages anywhere from about three to five. Female egg laying is individually consistent from year-to-year, with a variance of a day or two. Often about 3–5 eggs are laid every other day, though can be up to 2 days between the 4th and 5th eggs.

Clutch sizes fell historically from a mean of 3.5 (1929–1945) to 3.1 (1946–1948) and 2.7 (1949–1967) during the use of DDT then back up to 3.3 in 1967–1976 after DDT was banned. 7 of 266 clutches in early museum records were 6 egg clutches while one 7 egg clutch was recorded in Arizona. Records of 2 egg clutches may usually be laid by yearling females. The mean clutch size in 72 clutches was 3.5 and 3.33 in 46 clutches in central Arizona. Clutch sizes were similar in Ontario, at around a mean of 3.4, and in North Dakota, at 3.5. In southern Illinois, the mean clutch size is 4.1. The average clutch size in Wisconsin Cooper's hawks was 4.3, with a little varying range of 3.9 to 4.8 over 6 years. The clutch size in Wisconsin is on average 1–3 eggs smaller in immature females. There was no strong differences in Wisconsin in clutch sizes between urban and rural locations. In British Columbia, the mean clutch size was a particularly high 4.43. A clutch of 5 may be laid in 10 days and hatch in a span of about 3 days. Some authors suspect that clutch size is functionally reliant on habitat quality. The eggs are pale sky blue, fading to dirty white, with a smooth texture. However, an occasional set is reported as lightly spotted. It is reported by some authorities that the spotted eggs are laid by a female that does so each year, however others opine that these are misidentified eggs that were laid by broad-winged hawks. The eggs may measure 43 to 54 mm (1.7 to 2.1 in) in height by 34 to 42 mm (1.3 to 1.7 in) by diameter (averaging 47 mm to 49.1 mm × 37.6 mm to 38.7 mm (1.85 in to 1.93 in × 1.48 in to 1.52 in) in 121 from Ohio and 137 from New York, respectively). California eggs averaged 47.5 mm × 37.6 mm (1.87 in × 1.48 in) in a count of 82. The average weight of eggs is 43 g (1.5 oz) (with a range of 36 to 52 g (1.3 to 1.8 oz)).

=== Parental behavior ===
Incubation starts with the laying of the third egg. Evidence shows that pairs may be able to successfully delay breeding somewhat if it is unusually harsh and snowy early spring. The female mainly incubates (including throughout nighttime) though the male may substitute for 10–30 minutes after he brings his mate food, often doing so for about 2 to 3 times a day. The male usually roosts nearby during incubation, when he begins calling, she may join for 5–10 minutes before quickly flying back. By the third week, she may leave the nest only to take food or to defecate. Incubation lasts for 34–36 days, but sometimes may be down to 30 days. Eggs may be discarded by the mother after hatching but those that never hatch are left in place. The female sleeps on the nest until the young are 2 weeks old. The young were photographed to sleep at night directly under her body until there is not enough room to do so. The male is rarely present at nest longer than 3–4 seconds after hatching but at least once was recorded staying for 3 minutes when coming with prey after the female stops heavily brooding. Most prey deliveries are intercepted by the female slightly away from the nest. However, often the male does not perch far away, averaging about 765 m (2,510 ft), away from the nest during nesting to fledging stages, and occasionally as close as 120 m (390 ft). The nest may be crowded while the nestlings grow, and the female may expand platform with additional sticks. Usually the male Cooper's hawk removes the head and viscera of prey before bringing it, then taking it to plucking stumps, although often the plucking is done right where prey is killed. Rate of feeding depends on brood size but is dictated in part by the availability and size of prey. Only 2 to 3 food deliveries daily are usually necessary during incubation but the male has to hunt constantly once the young are large, rarely plucking and no longer decapitating prey. Peak deliveries are typically needed in about the 4th week. 6–9 deliveries a day are usually necessary for broods of 3 to 5. New Mexican nests with adult females had 95 prey deliveries in 120 hours of observations, whereas nest with younger females (i.e. second years), there were 65 prey deliveries were observed in 120 hours, or 694 fewer prey individuals per square kilometer than nests on territories of adult females. The parents are non-aggressive usually when the nest area is breached but the female may dive and call if a person climbs directly to their nest, sometimes also the male, often doing so silently. The reaction to human intrusion varies among individuals and probably with stage of nesting, hatch date, and probably prior experience. Generally, individuals rarely strike humans. Prolonged visits to the nest by humans, i.e. more than 30 minutes or around an hour, can cause temporary nest abandonment, and can be the cause of up to 1.2% of nest failures. During early incubation, the female often quietly flushes if a person comes up to nest tree or knocks on it but will sometimes call if someone climbs to the nest. After 2 weeks, she may begin to make "half-hearted" dives at the climber. After 3 or 4 weeks, some females still quietly flush but others grow increasingly aggressive with much variance in temperament. The aggressiveness increases around hatching, decreases for the first couple weeks after hatching, then quickly increases after 3 weeks. All dives at climbers are mock ones to early on but after the young are about 3 weeks old, either one of the pair may actually hit and draw blood from the climbers. Despite a reputation as a "somewhat aggressive" or even as being a hawk with a "very aggressive defense" towards humans in nest defense, the actual rate of attacks even at peak times seems to be very low and the reputation is thought to be fairly unearned. Various researchers consider this species less aggressive to intruders than sharp-shinned hawks and goshawks, and some even less so than red-shouldered hawks as well. Anti-predator behavior by parent Cooper's hawks against crows, red-tailed hawks and eastern gray squirrels were observed in Wisconsin to be surprisingly six times more often carried out by the male rather than the female. Female defensive attacks are sufficiently forceful enough to drive away more formidable predators such as bobcats (Lynx rufus) from the nest area. When large quadrupeds walk under the nest, the female may utter a semi-alarm call but does not leave the nest.

=== Development of young ===
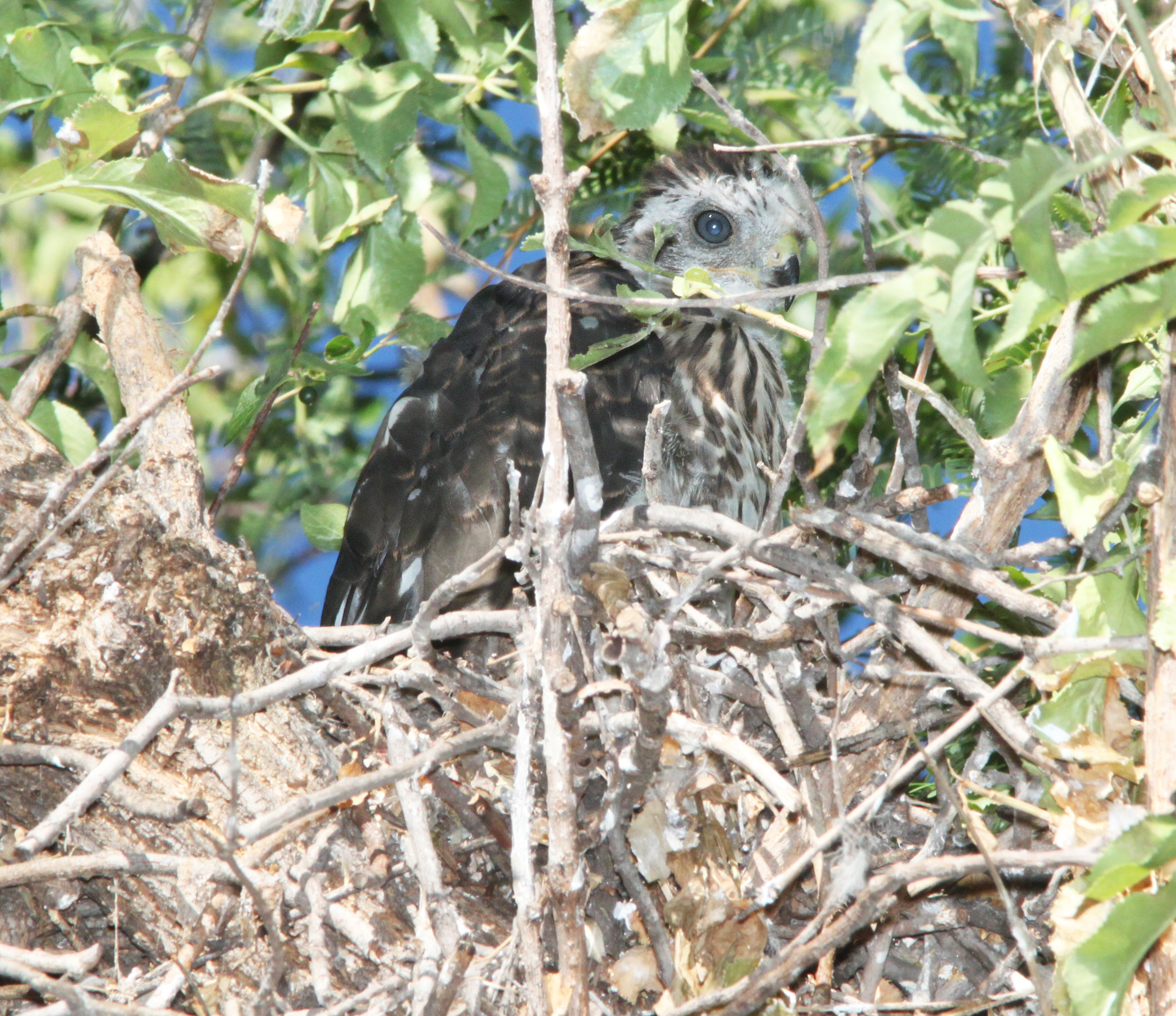
A large nestling Cooper's hawk peers out of the nest

Sex ratio can skew towards male in eggs, nestlings and fledglings in about 54–60% in nests of Cooper's hawks in the region of Milwaukee. However the sex ratio corrected over time in the urban area to an even amount, though it is still skewed outside the city (skewed broods towards males occur in cases where the females may become too costly to bring up, needing longer development stages and more foods). There are similar cases of male skewed ratios recorded now in southwestern cities (i.e. Tucson and Albuquerque). Due to the female usually only beginning incubation with the third egg, the first three eggs often hatch on the same day, while the fourth and fifth eggs often hatch one (rarely up to three) day later. New hatchling young average about 28 g (0.99 oz) in body mass and are about 9 cm (3.5 in) in total length. Hatchlings are covered in white natal down with blue-gray eyes and are tan to pink on many of the bare parts. While growth is slow for about three days, sexual dimorphism by size may begin by to be measurable by about seven days of age. At about 10 days, the nestlings begin to engage in rather feeble standing and wing flapping. The bill (at around 11 days) grows about twice as fast as the tarsus (at around 22 days). At 13 days, the nestlings stretch their legs and often yawn, and at 16 days can be aggressive if the nest is breached by people. Down first becomes deep and fluffy around two weeks, the following week first feathers among dense down, feather production accelerates but growth slows in the fourth week after which both increase for the fifth week. By 16–18 days, the nestlings preen well, starts to rip at prey and flap well. Within first two weeks, the young Cooper's hawks begin to defecate over nest edge but often soil the edge of nest. At three weeks often begin to stand up and feed by themselves and often begin to mantle prey away from each other. The young grow is rapid for the period when they are 17 days old to about 23 days, growth then slows down abruptly before they nearly pause growth to feather out and then thereafter become fully grown. At the age of three weeks a female nestling may stand and be able to fully feed herself. Sometimes smaller, more agile male nest mates may snatch several bits of meat from their larger sister as if taking food from the mother. Siblicide rarely has been proven for this species, and may occur "accidentally" at times. Sometimes a younger sibling that has died from other means may be eaten by the siblings or by the parents. In one case, an entire brood of 4 nestlings from 2.5 to 3.5 weeks old were found dead in the nest, apparently having died due to exposure after consistent heavy rains. Normal departure from nest is 30 days (up to 27 days) for males and 34 days for females, but averaged sooner in Oregon, at 27–30 days. Response to the parents after the young Cooper's becoming branchers depends on their hunger levels. Snyder and Wiley recorded feeding rates of 0.267 per hour for a brood of 2 and 0.564 per hour for a brood of 4. In New York and Wisconsin, the sex ratio of broods roughly even, but slightly male biased in Wisconsin (53.5% or 137 against 119). Food may be brought to the nest for the first ten days after the young leave it, as the young often return to rest on it or even to sun from it. Largely, the young are quiet until they leave the nest when they begin their loud, persistent hunger calls. Around this stage, the young hawks will frequently engage in play with sticks and pinecones. After they are about eight weeks old, they may start to hunt for themselves, but are usually still reliant on parents for food. The young Cooper's hawks are frequently loud, voracious and aggressive in procuring food from the parents. The parents soon seem to lose interest in feeding the young. Fledgling occurs at 27–34 days (males averaging earlier), but the young may often returns to nest and are not fully feathered until about 50–54 days. The siblings often stay within 4 m (13 ft) of each other even after leaving their parents range. Siblings before long-distance dispersal may hunt together, although may too steal prey from one another.

Juveniles Cooper's hawks in mostly urban areas of Arizona wandered somewhat randomly it seems until they were about 2.5–3 months old, when they settled on a wintering ground, averaging 9.7 km (6.0 mi) for females and averaging 7.4 km (4.6 mi) in males away from their respective natal sites. From their initial natal site to the site where they ultimately breed, in Wisconsin the average young male Cooper's hawk settled 7.2 km (4.5 mi) away from their nest of origin and the average young female 27.6 km (17.1 mi) away. Attempts to average mean dispersal distances within another study found farther than expected dispersal distances for Cooper's hawks from across the range. These were estimated at 43 km (27 mi). Greater dispersal distances by female juveniles are probably meant to limit the likelihood of inbreeding. In one instance, a grandson Cooper's mated with his grandmother over 3 years while there were two instances known of full siblings mating in Victoria, British Columbia. Cooper's hawks usually first breed at 2 years old but yearlings can often be reported to average at 6 to 22% of the breeding populations in short 3–6-year studies. Longer-term studies of 16–25 years of large urban populations within Milwaukee, Wisconsin, Tucson, Arizona and Victoria, British Columbia, show yearling females average 16–25% of the breeding population but that breeding by yearling male was uncommon to non-existent. Similarly, 79% more females bred in their first year in study in New Mexico than did males. Despite the considerable number of breeding young females, in Oregon, they averaged about 1 egg smaller and nearly a fledgling smaller than their older female counterparts; while results in Albuquerque were even more skewed towards breeding success for older females. Many studies found no yearling males to be breeding with various populations but 7% of 184 males in Tucson were yearlings over several years of study (78% of which were paired with immature females). Only one breeding male in both Victoria, British Columbia (579 sample size) and in Albuquerque (sample size 305) were yearling while 4.8% of 123 in Milwaukee were yearlings (92% of which were paired with an adult female). In New Mexico, males sometimes bred in their first year where there were rich prey concentrations, but had 37% higher mean annual mortality than those who did not breed until mature plumaged. New Mexican data showed that 14% of 20 males bred in their first year and 71% in their second year while 93% of the local female bred in their first year. In addition to Tucson, other cases of successful breeding by pairs of immatures reported in varied areas such as Indiana and New York. Considerable numbers of juvenile Cooper's hawks breeding may be historically associated with high turnover within populations. Evidence from the Milwaukee area shows a significant reduction in more recent decades of two-year old or younger breeding hawks, which was indicative of a recovering population.

=== Breeding success ===
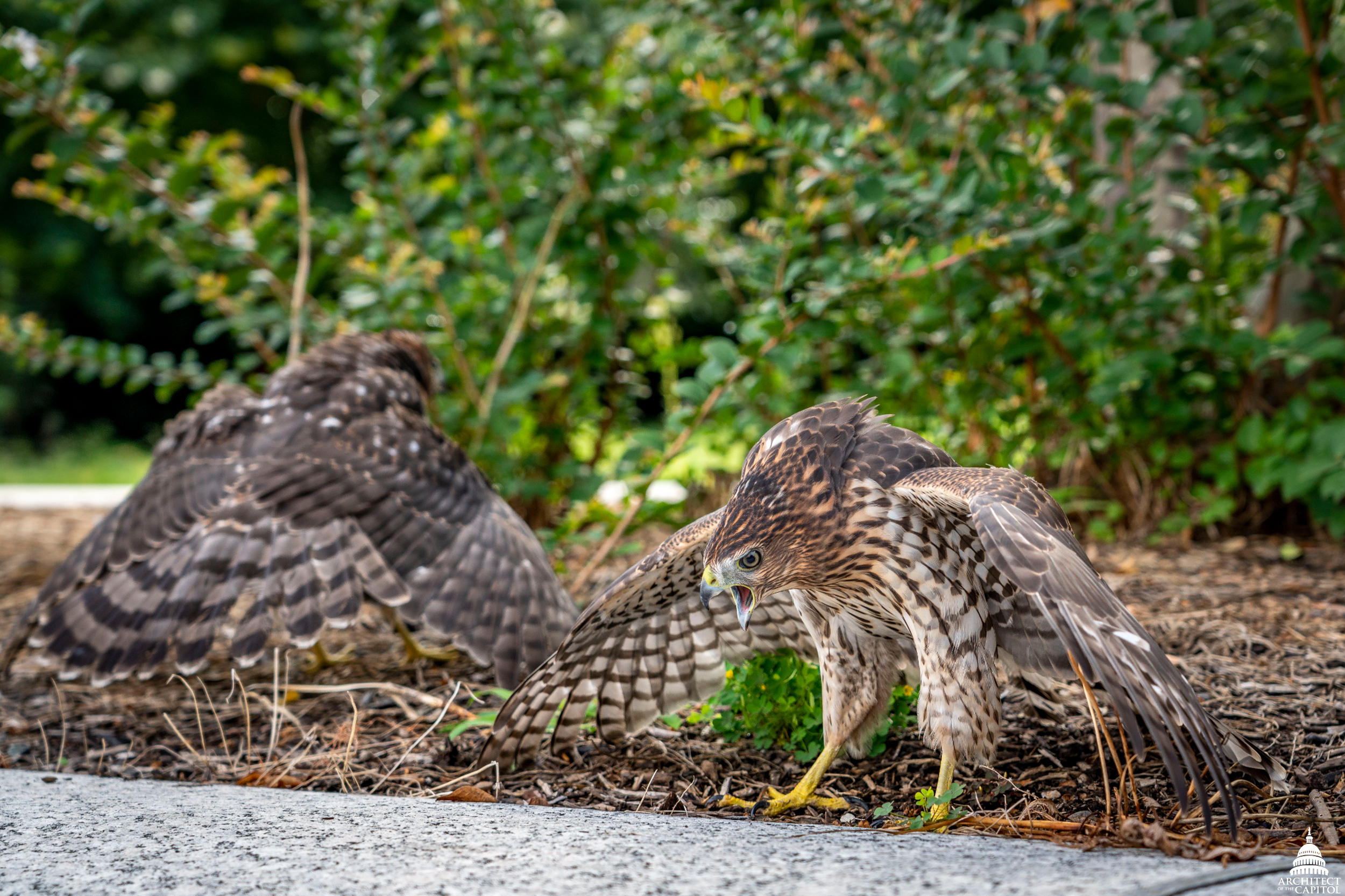
Juvenile sibling Cooper's hawks are loosely social shortly after dispersal

The average of 117 successful laid clutches was 4.18 eggs laid, 3.53 nestlings in successfully hatched clutches and 3.08 young in 26 successfully fledged broods in the Northeastern United States and southeastern Canada. Nesting success in western Pennsylvania in 32 successful nests was 3.2 fledglings; in 6 nests within Michigan, a mean of 3 in all nests got to fledge (4.3 eggs, 3 hatchlings on average); in Wisconsin, 3.5 fledglings were produced from successful nests (68.6% of 83 nests produced at least 1 fledgling); a mean of 2 fledged from 11 nests in Maryland and 2.23 fledglings per 41 successful nests in Arizona. In Illinois, in all breeding attempts (not just successful ones), the mean number of fledglings was 2.8. 81% of New York nests produced fledged young and 75% did so in Pennsylvania. Nesting success rates in western wildland areas may be lower such as in Utah, where 53.5% of nests fledged young, with many of the failures attributable to owl predation. Data from Oregon showed that 74% hatched and 61.4–69% successfully fledged, a much lower rate of nest success than goshawks, at 90.4%, and, surprisingly, than sharp-shinned hawks, at 91.7%. However, in the Oregon data, the number of eggs hatched was higher in Cooper's at 74% than in sharp-shinned hawks, at 69.4% (but not than the goshawk's). In Wisconsin in 2019, all of the eggs in a clutch of seven hatched and all of the young fledged. In North Dakota, better habitat such as upland forest showed much higher breeding success levels (at least 1 fledgling in 86% of 26 nests) than in poorer habitats such as narrow riparian strips, in which 1 fledgling was produced in 57% of 44 nests. Younger forest in North Dakota was surprisingly preferred, with the average estimated age of trees used by Cooper's at 59.9 against a random tree age in the area of 74.6. It was found that adult female who mated with males who provisioned food at a higher rate produced 1.6 more fledglings on average. Yearling females in northeastern Oregon tended to use younger successional stands than older females and tended to have lower productivity in clutch size and brood counts. Among 70 studied male hawks in Wisconsin, the number of fledged young produced in their lifetime was similar in males who did not breed until they were two years old (mean of 8.8 fledglings) compared to those who started breeding as yearlings (mean of 8.7 fledglings), with the most successful studied male having started breeding in his second year and had produced 32 fledglings by the time he was nine years of age. In Arizona and New Mexico, 23% of nests failed altogether and 56.5% of 23 nests in Wisconsin failed during incubation. A high genetic diversity, or allele level, was found in the nestlings of the urbanized population of Tucson, ensuring a hardy local population despite historic concerns about the parasite levels of nestlings in these populations.

=== Longevity and parasitism ===
Cooper's hawks can be a long-living bird. Some authors credit lifespans of up to 8 years of age in the wild. The oldest recorded bird recorded among migrants that bred in Oregon was 10 years and 5 months old. The oldest recorded breeding bird was a 12-year-old female in British Columbia while the oldest recorded wild bird was 20 years, 5 months old, banded in migration. However, the mean age at death recorded in 136 banded Cooper's hawks was 16.3 months. It was estimated for the species that the mortality rate in the first year of life for these hawk is 71–78% while it about 34–37% in the subsequent years. An annual survival rate of 75% was recorded for juvenile males in Tucson while the survival rate for juvenile female here was 64%. The survival rate for Tucson adults was between 69 and 88%. 75% was considered the survival rate of wintering Cooper's hawks in Indiana and southern Illinois but mean mortality between adults and juveniles was estimated to possibly average up to 46.4%. The annual survival rate in Albuquerque was 27–38% for female immatures. No correlation was found to body size or habitat in female survivorship but those in Wisconsin who changed nest sites annually may have had slightly higher survival rates than those who reused a same nest site. The opposite trend was reported for north Florida, wherein females who reused a nest site seemed to have higher survival rates. Historic survival rates (1925–1940) as reported were much lower, with extensive persecution causing an annual mortality that was estimated at 44%. Regular natural causes of mortality in Cooper's hawk, mainly of their young, include hypothermia, windstorms and tree collapses. Clashes between members of the same sex can be lethal, especially those between two males. Although Cooper's hawks are not known to prey on venomous snakes, one was found dead from envenomation next to a burrow holding both a copperhead (Agkistrodon contortrix) and an eastern diamondback rattlesnake (Crotalus adamanteus). Hunting accidents can frequently cause injury, especially in the form of potentially hobbling bone fractures, or sometimes can kill Cooper's hawks, especially those living in urban areas. In Indiana and Illinois, mortality from collisions were somewhat more prevalent in Cooper's hawks than in sharp-shinned hawks but instances of predation on immature sharp-shins were three times more prevalent than predations on immature Cooper's. Despite the risks of urban living, evidence indicates that urban Cooper's seem to be relatively successful, have moderate to low annual survival and reproduce prolifically. Cooper's hawks are known to be vulnerable to West Nile virus with some regularity but sometimes are able to survive despite the viral antibodies being found. Some mortality from West Nile has been reported, unsurprisingly. Fatal infections of the herpes virus have been recorded at least twice in Cooper's hawks. Cooper's hawks, along with great horned owls, had the greatest seroprevalence of Avipoxvirus among several raptorial birds in Illinois.

An extremely high amount of Trichomoniasis was found in nestlings in southeast Arizona. The bacteria was recorded in 95% of urban Cooper's hawk nestlings (though only 8% of non-urban ones) and caused about 50% of recorded nestling deaths, probably roughly doubling the nestling mortality rate compared to the non-urban areas. Adults are less vulnerable to Trichomoniasis infections but there was no variability to be found by sex, time of year or by location. In Wisconsin and British Columbia only 2.7% of 145 studied nestlings had Trichomoniasis. A high balance of the bacterial disease Mycoplasma gallisepticum, common to birds who frequent bird feeders, was found in Cooper's hawks (transmitted from their prey) studied in Illinois (the highest of any six raptor species studied) however effective antibodies were found and no external infection was noted. A high balance of bacterial flora were found the airways of 10 Cooper's hawks, including many with Salmonella (rarely fatal in hawks but can compromise their condition). 91% of 47 tested adults in Wisconsin had Leucocytozoon toddi and 62% had Haemoproteus but only 12% of 33 nestlings there had parasites. A similar blood parasite infection rate was found in northern New York (and California) as well. Compared to sharp-shinned hawks, while migrating off Lake Ontario, Cooper's hawks were found to have higher white blood cell counts (heterophiles, monocytes, and eosinophils) that may have made them more vulnerable to blood parasitism. Haematozoa infection rates were also higher in adults than they were in nestlings in Arizona. Blood parasites were recorded to be higher for later migrating Cooper's hawks in northern New York but were, on the contrary, higher in earlier migrating hawks in Marin County, California. Even rare parasites such as Sarcocystis may be found in wild Cooper's hawks, being apparently more prevalent in juvenile hawks and slightly more often afflicting females rather than males. Helminths were quite diverse in Cooper's hawks from Florida. In Minnesota and Wisconsin, several helminths were recorded and there was one instance of a tissue reaction from Serratospiculum as well as a case was reported of related Serratospiculoides in an injured Cooper's hawk in Yellowstone National Park.

== Status and conservation ==
=== Historic status ===
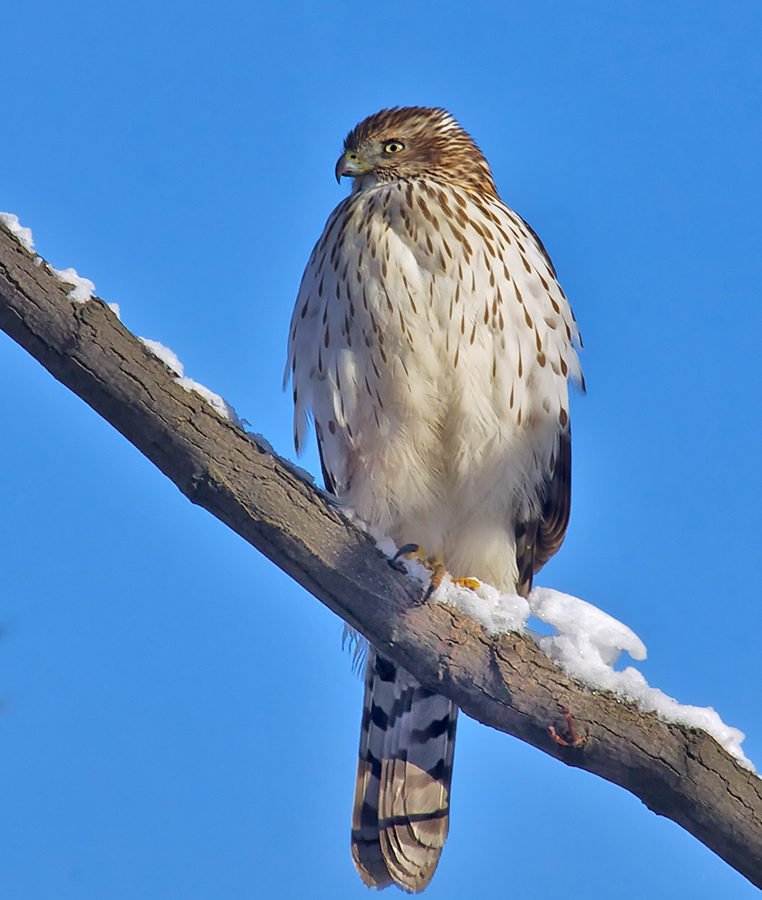
Immature Cooper's hawk in winter

Cooper's hawks have had an erratic status throughout the 20th into the 21st centuries. Historic data shows a threefold increase, roughly, around 1920. However, mortality rates shot up soon after as some authors consider the annual rate of mortality due largely to legalized direct persecution (poisoning, "pole trapping" and, especially, shooting) between 1925 and 1957 could range up to 60.5–77.6% in the most severe years. The amount of hawks shot down within different populations was estimated at 12 to 40%. Migration counts during the 1930s showed a strong downward trend, and an even worse decline for Cooper's hawk was observed during the late 1950s. Most Cooper's hawks reacted to heavy persecution by behaving with more shyness and elusiveness. Much of the human animosity towards Cooper's hawks was due to their hunting of gamebirds such as quail which human hunters themselves coveted. Furthermore, even ornithological writings from these times reveal a strong bias against the hawks for their hunting of admired small birds. However, several studies have determined that Cooper's hawk predation is not detrimental to healthy gamebird population, and that most of the blame must fall directly on overexploitation and habitat destruction of humans themselves, with a more recently quantified causal of changing climate further exacerbating the gamebirds' declines. Human hunting of Cooper's hawk declined when governmental protection of the species was instituted in the late 1960s (nearly two decades after some less controversial birds of prey species were protected in America).

However, instead of the expected gradual recovery, in the 1960s to 1970s, the breeding success rate dropped, in almost certain correlation with man's use of chemical biocides, mostly DDT. Raptorial birds which predominantly prey on either birds or fish were severely affected by the DDT biocide. The concentrations of organochlorines like DDT were high in all American Accipiter and Astur species, averaging at intermediate levels in Cooper's (0.11 mg/kg) but could include the highest known in the group at up to 1.5 mg/kg. A considerable average reduction in eggshell thickness was measured to average at around 7%. A particularly severe reduction in eggshell thickness was recorded in New York state, at an average of 19.02%. The survival of the species, especially in the eastern part of the continent, was seriously questioned in the 1960s and 1970s. Fewer dramatic ebbs were detected during the height of DDT use in the western part of North America overall, perhaps because of less overall reliance on bird prey. Nonetheless, 11 of 16 eggs in Arizona and New Mexico broke due to this cause. Subsequent to the prohibition of DDT use in North America, the population increased exponentially in the 1980s and 1990s and ultimately was thought to stabilize. Data from Hawk Mountain Sanctuary shows that Cooper's hawk has recovered from DDT more gradually than the sharp-shinned hawk here.

=== Current status ===
In the 1990s, it was estimated that Cooper's hawks may number "well into six figures" due to their regular distribution over 8 million square kilometers. Today, Cooper's hawk is thought to number around 800,000 in the United States and Canada. These estimates were gained cross-referencing the number of hectares per active nest, which was in the range of 101 to 2,326 ha (250 to 5,750 acres) in the western states and 272 to 5,000 ha (670 to 12,360 acres) in the Midwestern and eastern states, as well as data from Christmas Bird Counts and migration counts. Evidence from long-time migration counts at Bake Oven Knob show slight peaks at intervals of 3 to 4 years, however no dramatic declines have been detected since the 1980s. Following their historic decline, Breeding Bird Surveys have tracked strong increases of the breeding population (upward trends from 1.2% in California to 4.4% in Pennsylvania) in six states, with a 2.2% increase overall, and similar trends in multiple other states. In many states (Arizona, California, Florida, Missouri, New Mexico and North Dakota) the numbers are probably similar or greater to those prior to 1945. It is thought that the population of Cooper's hawks in Wisconsin is nearly saturated relative to the landmass of the state, after a rough 25-fold increase since the late 1970s. Based largely on data from well-known populations such as Tucson and Milwaukee, some authors opine that Cooper's hawk may be the most common raptor in American urban areas today, although surely other common raptorial birds such as red-tailed hawks, American kestrels and turkey vultures (Cathartes aura) may easily rival them in this regard.

=== Potential threats ===
Shooting is now a generally insignificant cause of mortality though is still sometimes reported. Despite the declining effect of pesticides on Cooper's hawk's overall population, lingering harmful effect from dieldrin has been indicated in some hawks in British Columbia and recently some hawks have been killed by the pesticide warfarin. Bioaccumulation of pollutants may still have considerable effect on this species. Declines due to pollutants are seemingly occurring for Cooper's hawks living in Vancouver. Recent cases of cyanide poisoning of Cooper's hawks have been reported. Lead poisoning can sometimes threaten Cooper's hawks, through lead bullets left in dead or injured game.

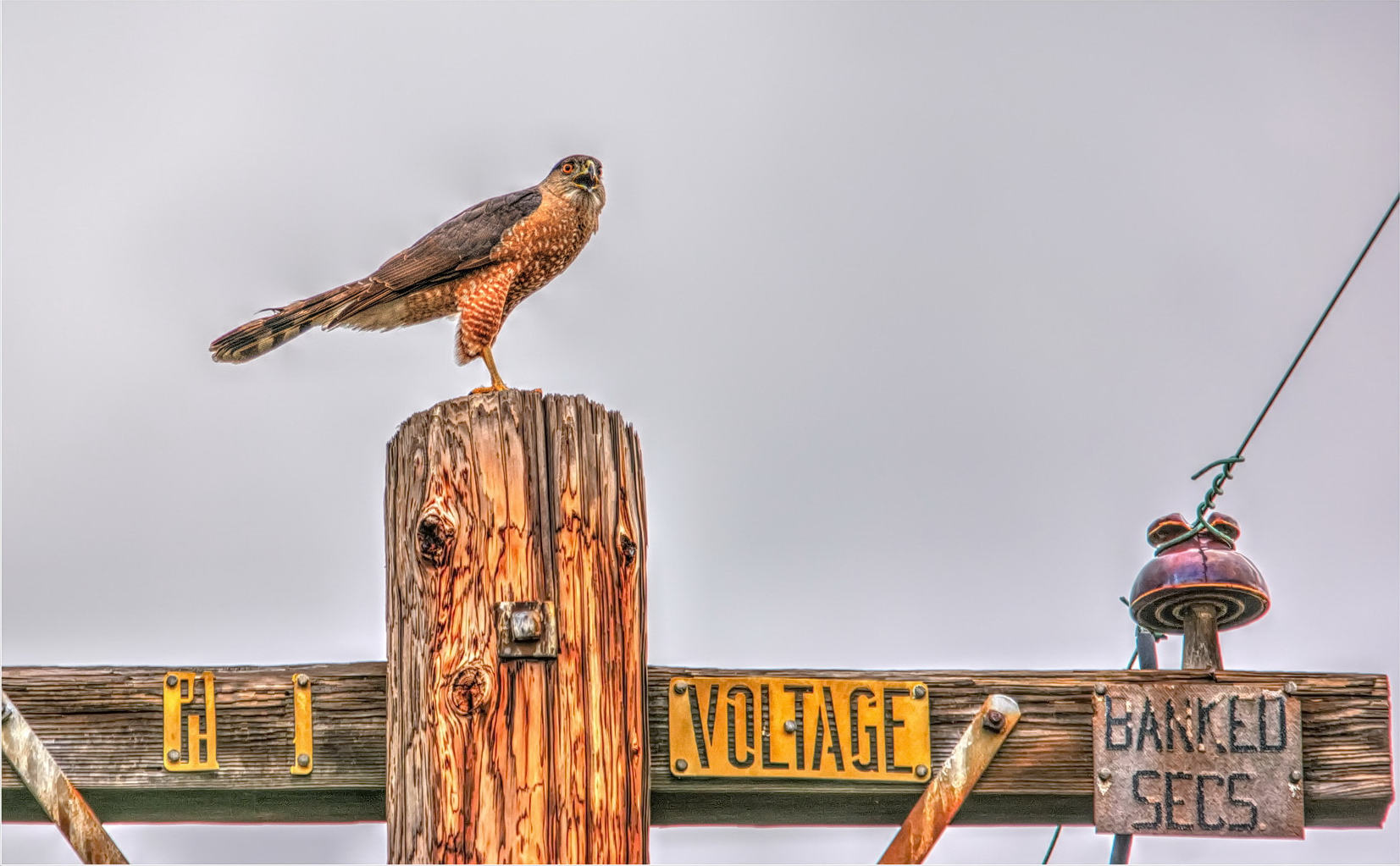
A high risk of wire collision is present for Cooper's hawks dwelling in urban vicinities.

Most urban-related mortality for Cooper's hawks is likely to be collisions with manmade objects. These are mostly wire strikes (with or without resulting electrocution), automobile collisions and window strikes or with other parts of manmade structure while distractingly hunting. 70.8% of diagnosed mortality for Cooper's hawks of yearling age or older in Tucson was from such collisions. In less developed regions, such as much of Montana, the rate of wire collisions and electrocutions was considerably lower for Cooper's hawks than for various other birds of prey who are either larger-bodied and/or use less forested areas. Other studies support that the number of fatal window and wire collisions of urban-living Cooper's hawks is "excessively high". Cooper's hawks found in the vicinity of airports are at risk of bird strike with aircraft, therefore 185 Cooper's were translocated away from these areas (the 5th most frequently translocated raptor species). A similar translocation effort away from the Los Angeles basin around the Los Angeles International Airport translocated 349 Cooper's hawks (about a fifth of all translocated raptors), apparently successfully. Cooper's hawks are sometimes displaced by the placement of wind farms, with studies indicating that Cooper's need about seven years to locally recover from such displacement. Synurbization has been detected in Cooper's hawks as, despite the dangers of various kinds of collisions, it has been found that in favorable urban areas, hawks of the species can seem to breed more closer to one another, gather more food and produce more young on average than those outside such areas. Even New York City has seen (if erratically present) since the late 1990s, a return of nesting Cooper's hawks.

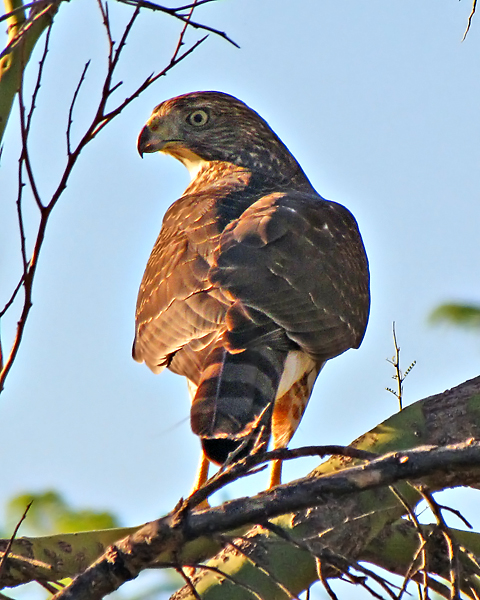
A Cooper's hawk of the ample Tucson population.

Logging may decrease some populations but the overall effect it has on Cooper's hawks is generally considered unknown. As with all Astur and Accipiter species, Cooper's hawks can presumably only withstand a certain level of loss of habitat before an area becomes essentially unlivable. Studies in Arizona determined that heavily grazed agricultural areas were favored over lightly grazed ones due to greater prey concentrations in the latter habitats. On the contrary, in the early 1990s (while the species was generally recovering), the species was considered to be "state-endangered" in New Jersey, with ongoing harmful effects found for poorly regulated (or entirely unregulated) logging and land development within 40 to 120 m (130 to 390 ft) of active nests. In the Black Hills, harvesting of ponderosa pines appears to be causing Cooper's, sharp-shins and goshawks to vacate large parts of the forest. It has been recommended that a buffer zone of at least 200 to 240 m (660 to 790 ft), with a median estimated space needed of about 525 m (1,722 ft), should be free from human disturbance or development to retain the protected nests of Cooper's hawks. Studies in New Mexico showed that these hawks are reliant on the conservation of riparian woodlands in much of the southern part of the state. Despite the large, productive and genetically diverse population of Cooper's hawks in Tucson, several authors have hypothesized, controversially, that the city is an ecological trap, due to the unsustainably high turnover for nestlings via Trichomoniasis-related mortality and for adults via frequent lethal collisions.

Quite few Cooper's hawks have ever been gathered for use in falconry. This hawk is fairly unpopular in falconry practices due to its high-strung personality and is additionally considered in such captive conditions as given towards "tyrannical", "hysterical" and "demanding" behaviors, even compared to its similarly disposed larger cousin, the American goshawk, which is fairly popular in falconry.

=== Threat to conservation dependent species ===
Generally, Cooper's hawks hunt the locally common birds that are available and probably control some birds (such as the more numerous icterids and corvids) that may without the influence of natural predation risk overpopulation and potential harm to ecosystems. However, as an opportunistic natural predator of almost any North American bird smaller than itself, Cooper's hawk may inadvertently deplete populations of rarer, conservation-dependent species. The American kestrel, whose populations have experienced considerable decrease, may be one species which has suffered from the extensive predation of the recovered Cooper's hawk population. However, there is no evidence that Cooper's hawk predation is one of the leading causes of kestrel declines and data seems to indicate it is, at most, a localized threat. Similarly, Cooper's hawks occasionally prey upon other threatened bird species, and, although said predation is not a primary cause of concern, may exacerbate the already worrying condition of many declining North American birds. Some threatened species known to be thusly hunted by these hawks are greater prairie-chickens (Tympanuchus cupido), lesser prairie-chickens (Tympanuchus pallidicinctus), red-headed woodpeckers, Bell's vireo (Vireo bellii), Florida scrub jay (Aphelocoma coerulescens), wood thrush (Hylocichla mustelina) (Cooper's being identified as one three major nest predators along with blue jays and raccoons), golden-winged warbler (Vermivora chrysoptera), cerulean warbler (Setophaga cerulea) and golden-cheeked warbler (Setophaga chrysoparia).

== Images ==
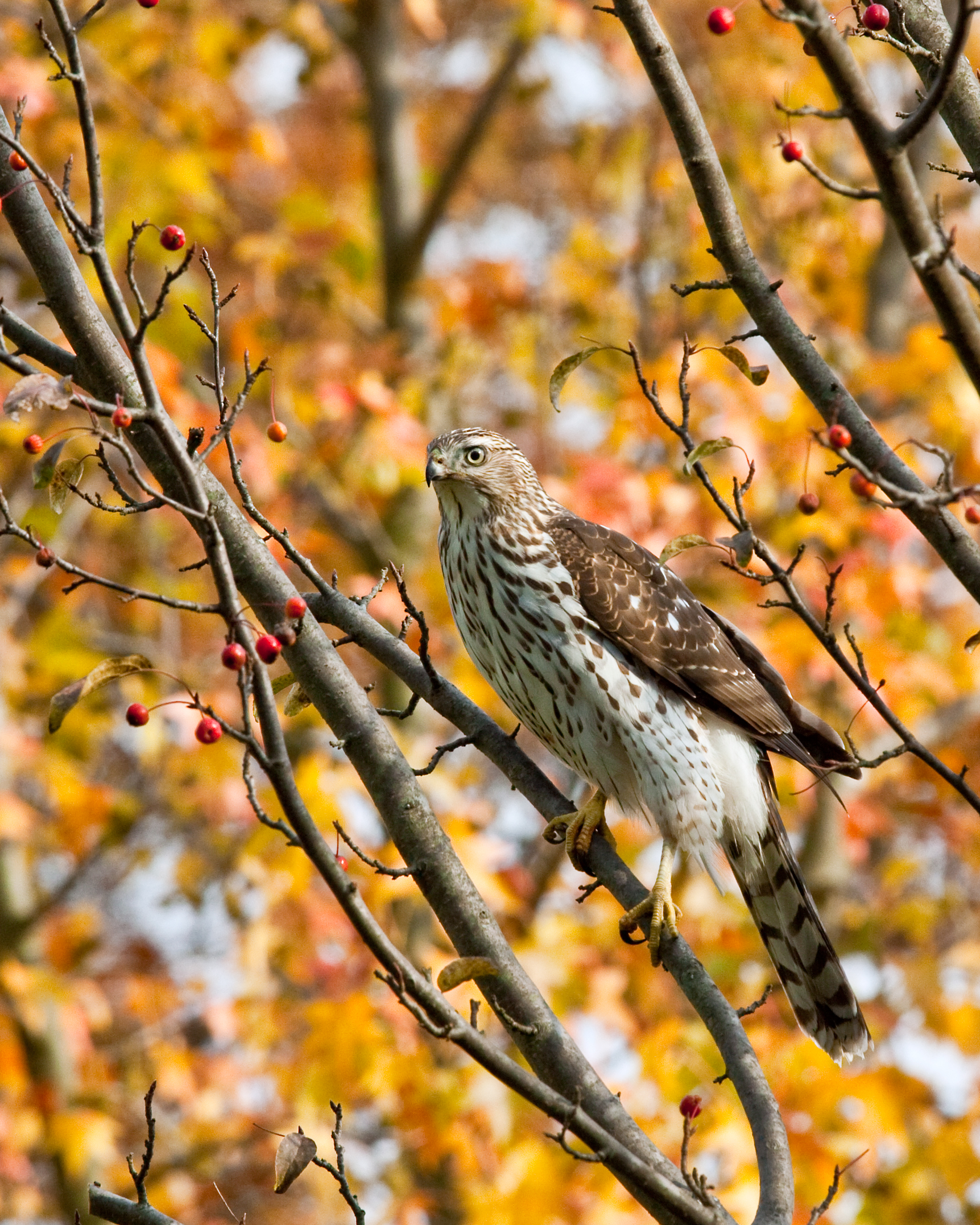
Cooper's hawk immature

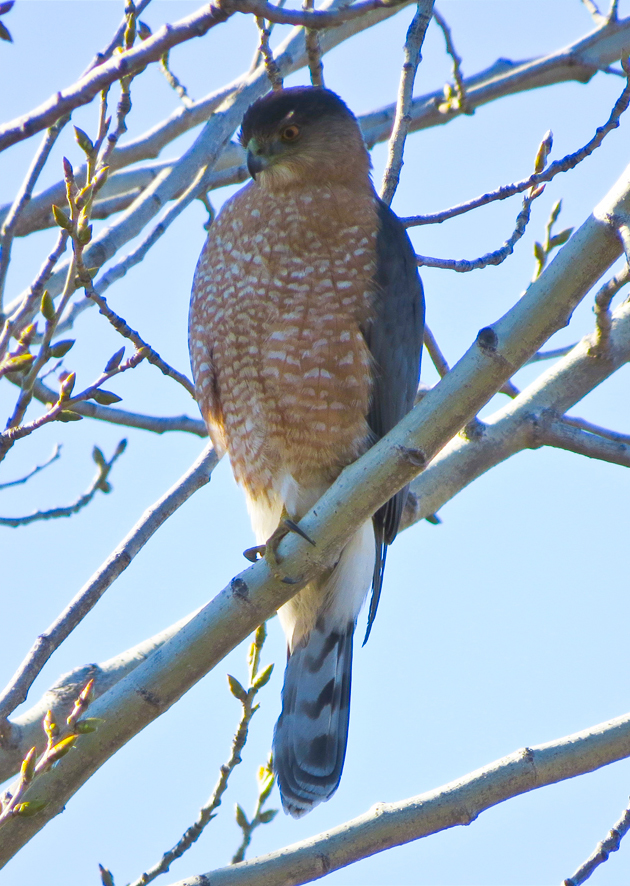
Adult Cooper's hawk

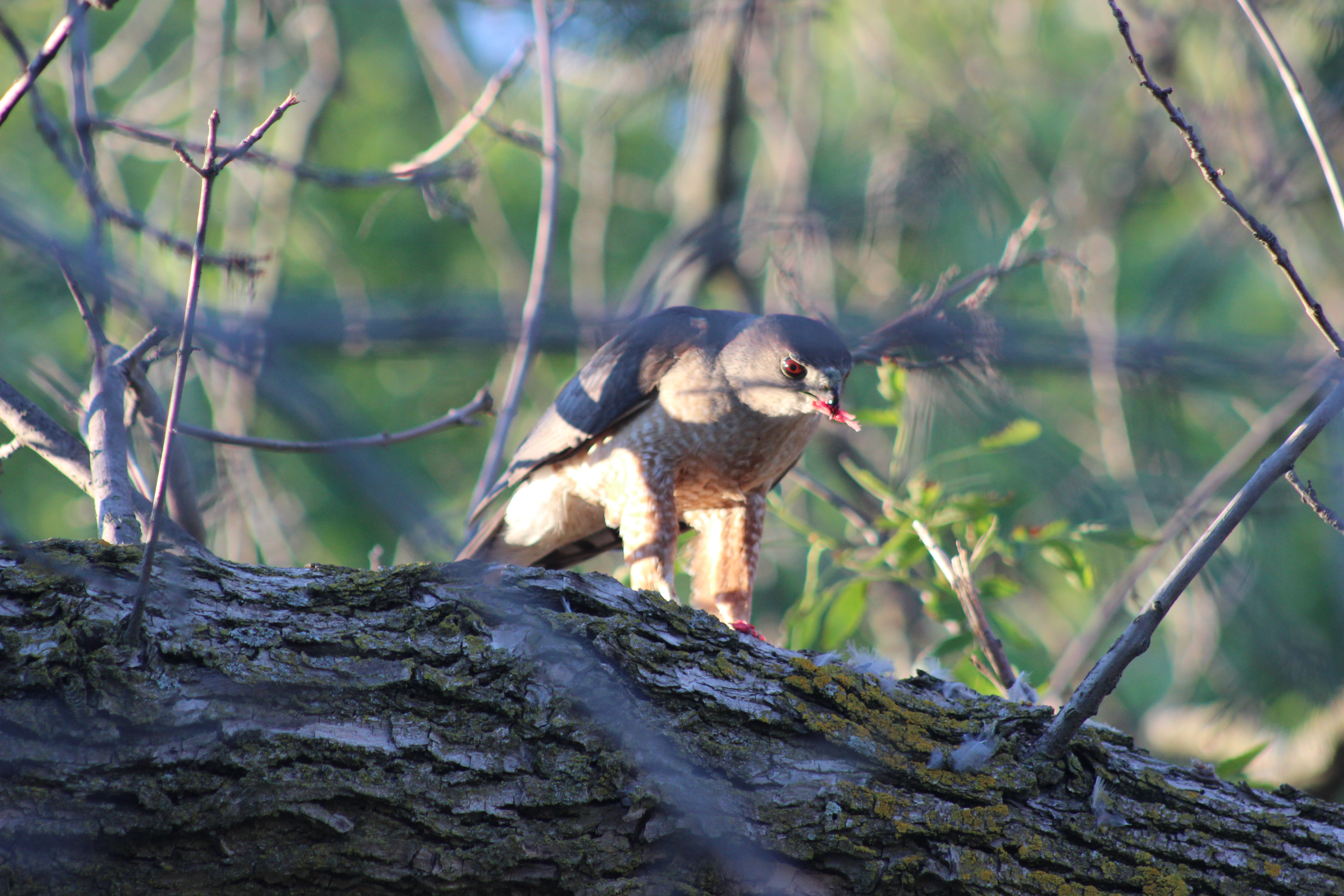
Cooper's hawk feeding on a small bird
