= A. gentilis =

A. gentilis may refer to:

- Acarolella gentilis, a moth species
- Accipiter gentilis, the northern goshawk, a bird species
- Adaina gentilis, a moth species
- Aureoboletus gentilis, a fungus species
- Austroeme gentilis, a beetle species
