= Acarolella stereopis =

Scientific classification
- Kingdom: Animalia
- Phylum: Arthropoda
- Class: Insecta
- Order: Lepidoptera
- Family: Tortricidae
- Genus: Acarolella
- Species: A. stereopis

Binomial name
- Acarolella stereopis (Meyrick, 1931)

Synonyms
- Euxanthis stereopis Meyrick, 1931; Euxanthis steropis Razowski, 1964

Species of moth

Acarolella stereopis is a species of moth of the family Tortricidae. It is found in Argentina.
