= Acarolella =

Scientific classification
- Kingdom: Animalia
- Phylum: Arthropoda
- Clade: Pancrustacea
- Class: Insecta
- Order: Lepidoptera
- Family: Tortricidae
- Tribe: Cochylini
- Genus: Acarolella; Razowski & Becker, 1983

Genus of tortrix moths

Acarolella is a genus of tortrix moths belonging to the subfamily Tortricinae and the tribe Cochylini. It was described in 1983 by Józef Razowski and V. O. Becker.

== Species ==
As of November 2019, the Online World Catalogue of the Tortricidae listed the following species:

- Acarolella gentilis Razowski, 1994
- Acarolella obnixa Razowski & Becker, 1983
- Acarolella stereopis (Meyrick, 1931)

== See also ==
- List of Tortricidae genera
