= Acarolella obnixa =

Scientific classification
- Kingdom: Animalia
- Phylum: Arthropoda
- Clade: Pancrustacea
- Class: Insecta
- Order: Lepidoptera
- Family: Tortricidae
- Genus: Acarolella
- Species: A. obnixa

Binomial name
- Acarolella obnixa Razowski & Becker, 1983

Species of moth

Acarolella obnixa is a species of moth of the family Tortricidae. It is found in Brazil (Parana).
