= Acarolella gentilis =

Scientific classification
- Domain: Eukaryota
- Kingdom: Animalia
- Phylum: Arthropoda
- Class: Insecta
- Order: Lepidoptera
- Family: Tortricidae
- Genus: Acarolella
- Species: A. gentilis

Binomial name
- Acarolella gentilis Razowski, 1994

Tortrix moth species in tribe Cochylini

Acarolella gentilis is a species of tortrix moth in the tortricine tribe Cochylini. The species was first described in 1994 by Józef Razowski. The type specimen was collected in Bolivia.

== Appearance ==
Acarolella gentilis has a wingspan of 17 mm.
