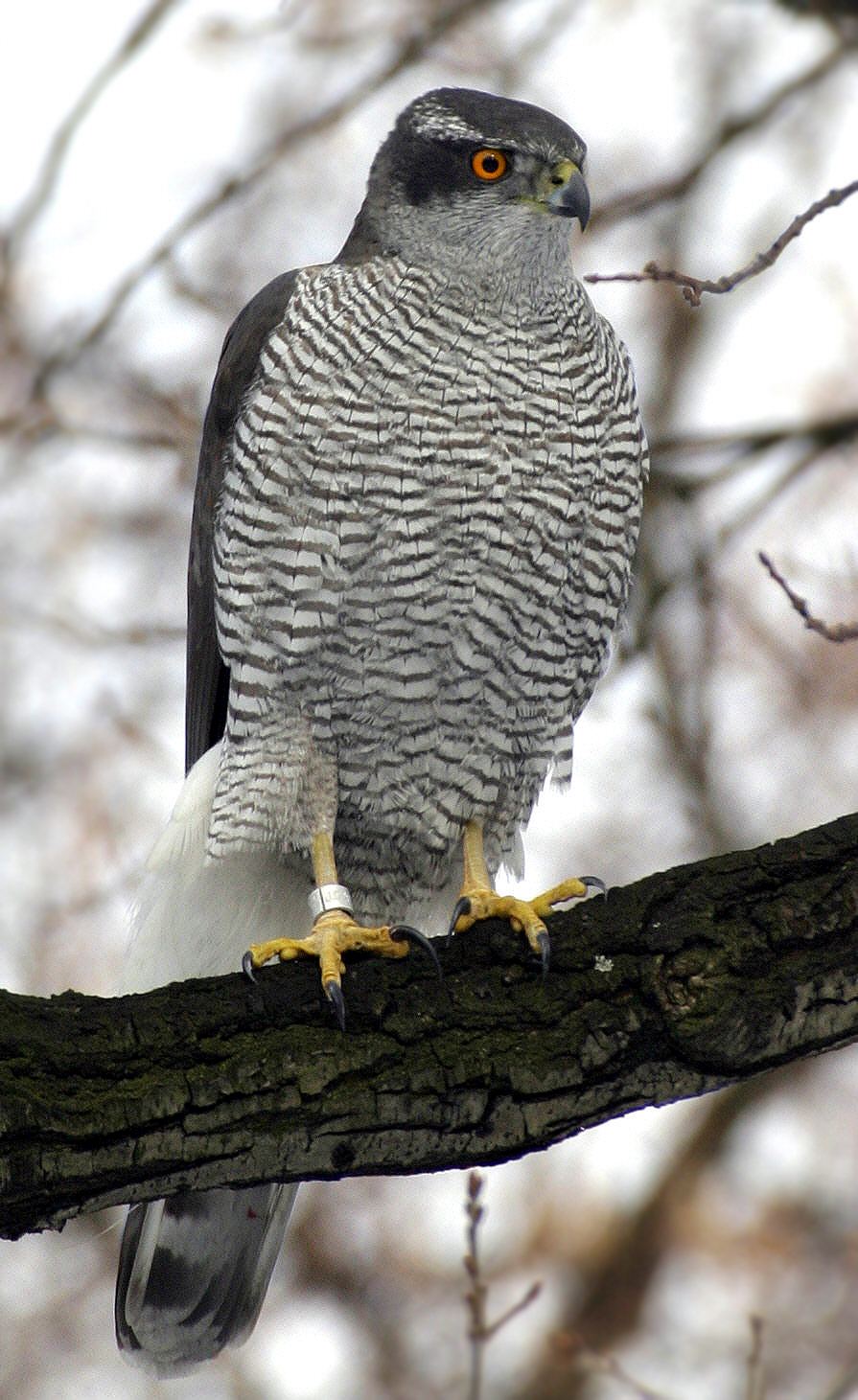
- Adult in Berlin

Conservation status
- Least Concern (IUCN 3.1)

Scientific classification
- Kingdom: Animalia
- Phylum: Chordata
- Class: Aves
- Order: Accipitriformes
- Family: Accipitridae
- Genus: Astur
- Species: A. gentilis

Binomial name
- Astur gentilis (Linnaeus, 1758)

Subspecies
- Astur gentilis albidus; Astur gentilis arrigonii; Astur gentilis buteoides; Astur gentilis fujiyamae; Astur gentilis gentilis; Astur gentilis marginatus; Astur gentilis schvedowi (eastern goshawk)
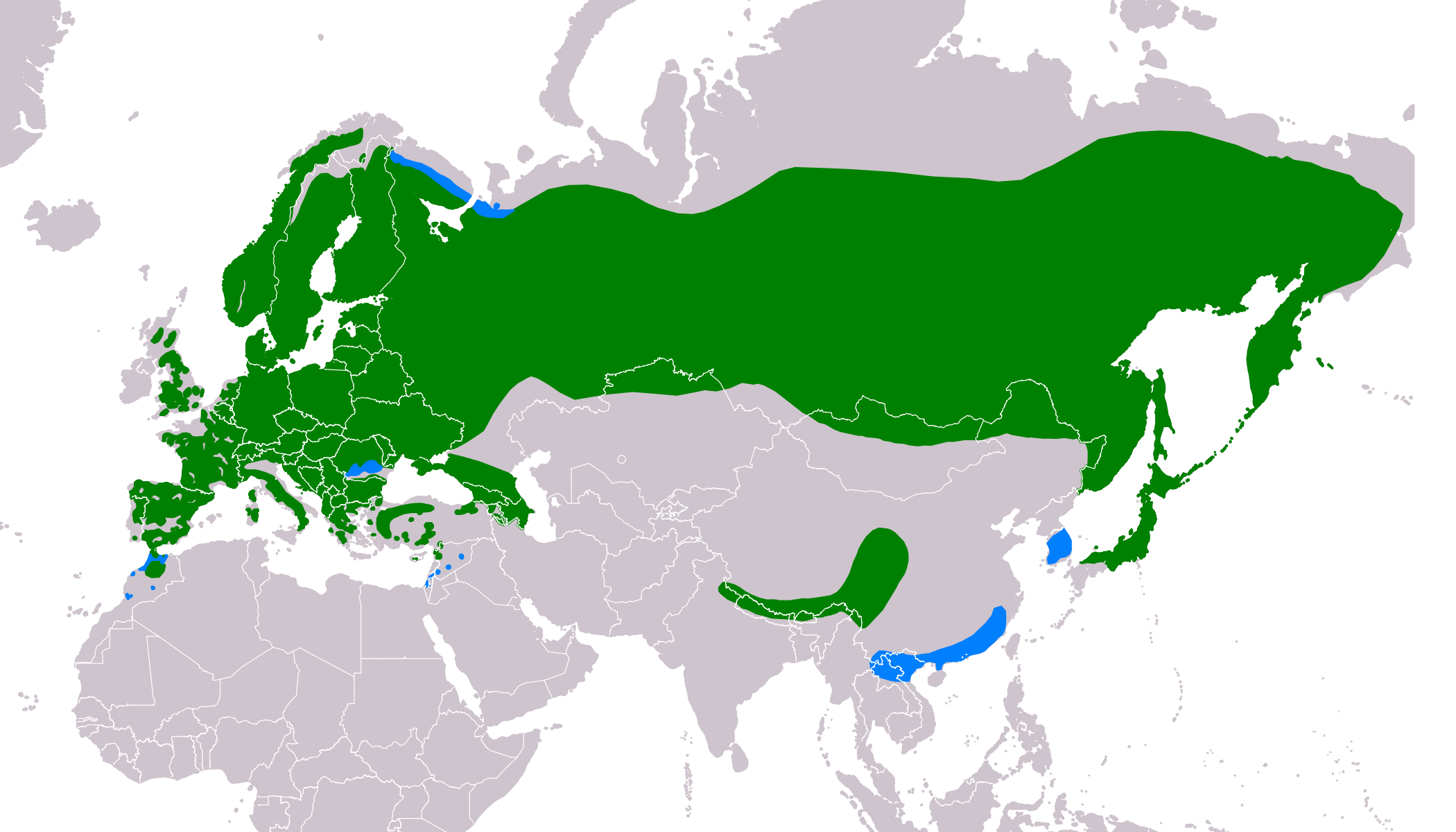
- Range of A. gentilis Resident Non-breeding

Synonyms
- Falco gentilis Linnaeus, 1758; Accipiter gentilis

Audio
- Song

= Eurasian goshawk =

Species of bird

The Eurasian goshawk (/ˈɡɒsˌhɔːk/; Astur gentilis) is a species of medium-large bird of prey in the family Accipitridae, a family which also includes other extant diurnal raptors, such as eagles, buzzards and harriers. It was formerly placed in the genus Accipiter. It is a widespread species that inhabits many of the temperate parts of Eurasia. Except in a small portion of southern Asia, it is the only species of "goshawk" in its range and it is thus often referred to, both officially and unofficially, as simply goshawk. It is mainly resident, but birds from colder regions migrate south for the winter. As of 2023, goshawks found in North America are no longer considered to be conspecific, but are now designated as the American goshawk (Astur atricapillus).

== Taxonomy ==
The Eurasian goshawk was formally described in 1758 by the Swedish naturalist Carl Linnaeus in the tenth edition of his Systema Naturae under the binomial name Falco gentilis. It was formerly placed in the genus Accipiter. When molecular phylogenetic studies found that Accipiter was polyphyletic, the genus was split to create monophyletic genera. The genus Astur was resurrected to accommodate the Eurasian goshawk and eight other species that had previously been placed in Accipiter. The resurrected genus had originally been introduced in 1799 by the French naturalist Bernard Germain de Lacépède. The scientific name is Latin; astur means "hawk" and gentilis is "noble" or "gentle" because in the Middle Ages only the nobility were permitted to fly goshawks for falconry.

A molecular genetic study published in 2019 unexpectedly found that the Eurasian goshawk and the American goshawk were not sister species. Instead, the Eurasian goshawk was most closely related to Meyer's goshawk (Astur meyerianus) of southeast Asia. The genus Astur is a genus of diurnal raptors. This group of agile, smallish, forest-dwelling hawks has been in existence for possibly tens of millions of years, probably as an adaptation to the explosive numbers of small birds that began to occupy the world's forest in the last few eras. The harriers are the only group of extant diurnal raptors that seem to bear remotely close relation to this genus, whereas buteonines, Old World kites, sea eagles and chanting-goshawks are much more distantly related and all other modern accipitrids are not directly related.

Within the genus Astur, the Eurasian goshawk seems to belong to a superspecies with other larger goshawks from different portions of the world. The American goshawk, found in North America, was previously considered conspecific with Eurasian goshawk, with which it formed the species complex "northern goshawk". Meyer's goshawk, found in the South Pacific, has been posited as the most likely to be the closest related living cousin to the Eurasian goshawk, the somewhat puzzling gap in their respective ranges explained by other Palearctic raptors such as Bonelli's eagles (Aquila fasciata) and short-toed eagles (Circaetus gallicus) that have extant isolated tropical island populations and were probably part of the same southwest Pacific radiation that led to the Meyer's goshawk. A presumably older radiation of this group may have occurred in Africa, where it led to both the Henst's goshawk of Madagascar and the black sparrowhawk (Astur melanoleucus) of the mainland. While the Henst's goshawk quite resembles the northern goshawks, the black sparrowhawk is superficially described as a "sparrowhawk" due to its relatively much longer and finer legs than those of typical goshawks but overall its size and plumage (especially that of juveniles) is much more goshawk than sparrowhawk-like.

Outside of the presumed superspecies, the genus Erythrotriorchis may be part of an Australasian radiation of basal goshawks based largely on their similar morphology to northern goshawks.

The term goshawk comes from the Old English gōsheafoc, "goose-hawk".

=== Subspecies ===
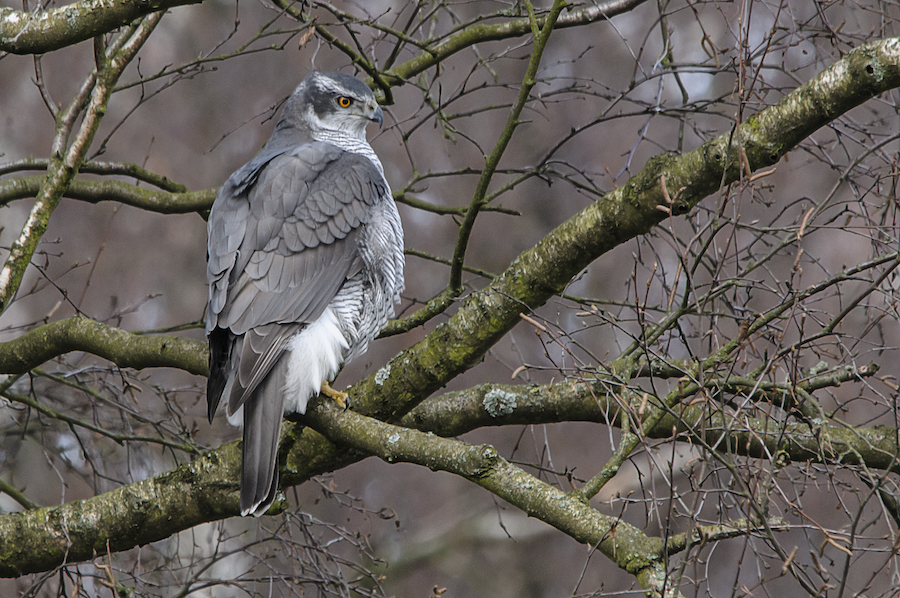
Typical adult with a strong brownish-grey cast, from the nominate subspecies, A. g. gentilis

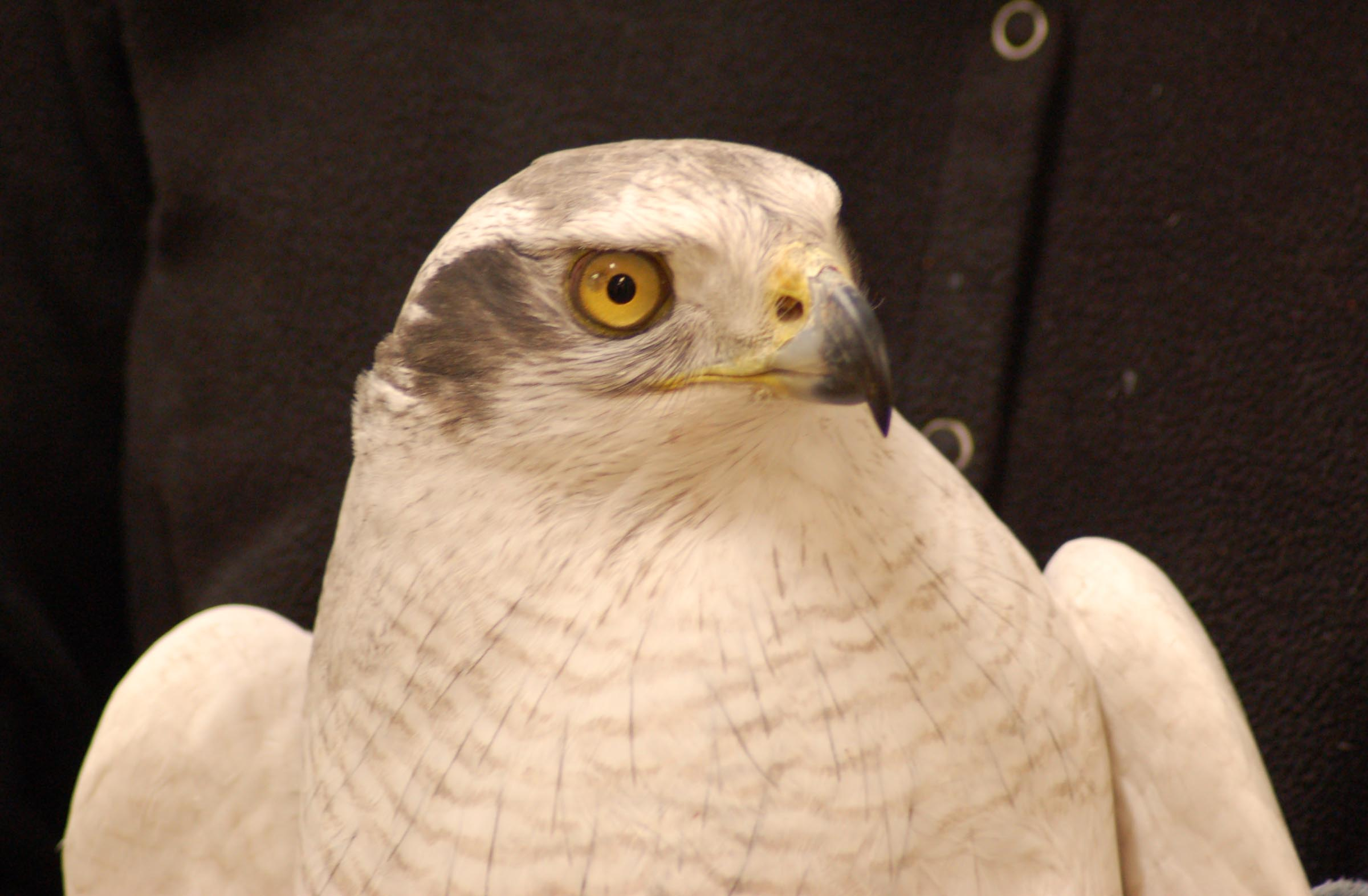
A captive specimen of whitish large goshawk of Siberian origin, possibly part of A. g. albidus.

As a result of the high variation of individual goshawks in plumage characteristics and typical trends in clinal variation and size variations that largely follow Bergmann's rule and Gloger's rule, an excessive number of subspecies have been described for the Eurasian goshawk in the past. In Europe (including European Russia) alone, 12 subspecies were described between 1758 and 1990. Today, seven weakly differentiated subspecies are recognised:

- A. g. gentilis (Linnaeus, 1758) – The nominate race is distributed through most of the species current European range, excluding northern Fennoscandia, northwestern Russia and possibly some of the Mediterranean islands they inhabit. Outside of Europe, this subspecies' range extends south to northwestern Africa (Algeria, Tunisia, Morocco) and east in Eurasia to Urals, the Caucasus and Asia Minor. It is a typically large subspecies, with high levels of sexual dimorphism. The wing chord of males ranges from 300 to 342 mm (11.8 to 13.5 in) and of females from 336 to 385 mm (13.2 to 15.2 in). Body mass is variable, range from 517 to 1,110 g (1.140 to 2.447 lb) in males and from 820 to 2,200 g (1.81 to 4.85 lb) in females. In some cases, the largest adult females (including some exceptionally big females which are the heaviest goshawks known from anywhere) from within a population are up to four times heavier than the smallest adult males, although this is exceptional. The highest average weights come from central Fennoscandia, where the sexes weigh on average 865 g (1.907 lb) and 1,414 g (3.117 lb), respectively. The lowest come from Spain, where goshawks of this race weigh a median of 690 g (1.52 lb) in males and 1,050 g (2.31 lb) in females. The nominate race is generally a dark slaty-brown colour on its back and wing coverts with a blackish-brown head. The supercilium is thin and the underside is generally creamy with heavy dark barring. On average, in addition to their smaller size, nominate goshawks to the south of the race's distribution have thinner supercilia and broader and denser barring on the underside. An aberrant "isabelline" morph is known mainly from central and eastern Europe, where the goshawk may be a general beige colour (somewhat similar to the pale birds from the races albidus and buteoides), but such birds appear to be very rare.
- A. g. arrigonii Kleinschmidt, 1903 – This is an island race found on the Mediterranean isles of Sardinia and Corsica. It averages smaller and weaker-footed than goshawks from the nominate race. The wing chord measures 293 to 308 mm (11.5 to 12.1 in) in males and 335 to 347 mm (13.2 to 13.7 in) in females. This race is typically a more blackish brown above with almost fully black head, while the underside is almost pure white and more heavily overlaid with black barring and conspicuous black shaft-streaks. This subspecies is not listed by all authorities but is often considered valid.
- A. g. buteoides Menzbier, 1882 – This race is characteristic of the northern stretches of the western Eurasian range of goshawks, being found as a breeding species from northern Fennoscandia to western Siberia, ranging as far as the Lena River. In the eastern portion of its distribution, many birds may travel south to central Asia to winter. This is a large race, averaging larger than most populations of the nominate race but being about the same size as the big nominate goshawks with which they may overlap and interbreed with in Fennoscandia. The wing chord in males ranges from 308 to 345 mm (12.1 to 13.6 in) while that of females ranges from 340 to 388 mm (13.4 to 15.3 in). The body mass of males has been reported from 870 to 1,170 g (1.92 to 2.58 lb), with an average of 1,016 g (2.240 lb), while that of females is reportedly 1,190 to 1,850 g (2.62 to 4.08 lb), with an average of 1,355 g (2.987 lb). Usually, this race is an altogether paler colour than the nominate, being blue-grey above with a dusky-grey crown and a broad supercilium. The underside is white with rather fine blackish-brown barring. Pale flecking on the feather shafts sometimes result in barred appearance on the contour feathers of the nape, back and upper wing. Many birds from this subspecies also have a tan to pale brown eye colour. These two characteristics are sometimes considered typical of this race, but individuals are rather variable. In western Siberia, about 10% of birds of this race are nearly pure white (similar to albidus) with varied indications of darker streaking.
- A. g. albidus Menzbier, 1882 – This race of goshawk is found in northeastern Siberia and Kamchatka. Many birds of this race travel south for the winter to Transbaikalia, northern Mongolia and Ussuriland. This race continues the trend for goshawks to grow mildly larger eastbound in Eurasia and may be the largest known race based on the midpoint of known measurements of this race, although limited sample sizes of measured goshawks shows they broadly overlap in size with A. g. buteoides and large-bodied populations of A. g. gentilis. The wing chord can range from 316 to 346 mm (12.4 to 13.6 in) in males and from 370 to 388 mm (14.6 to 15.3 in) in females. Known males have scaled from 894 to 1,200 g (1.971 to 2.646 lb) while a small sample of females weighed have had a body mass between 1,300 and 1,750 g (2.87 and 3.86 lb). This is easily the palest race of Eurasian goshawk. Many birds are pale grey above with much white about the head and very sparse barring below. However, about half of the goshawks of this race are more or less pure white, with at most only a few remnants of pale caramel flecking about the back or faint brownish markings elsewhere.
- A. g. schvedowi Menzbier, 1882 – This race ranges from the Ural Mountains east to the Amurland, Ussuriland, Manchuria, west-central China and sporadically as a breeder into Sakhalin and the Kuril Islands. A. g. schvedowi averages smaller than the other races on the mainland of Eurasia, with seemingly the highest sexual dimorphism of any goshawk race, possibly as an adaptation to prey partitioning in the exceptionally sparse wooded fringes of the desert-like steppe habitat that characterises this race's range. The wing chord has been found to measure 298 to 323 mm (11.7 to 12.7 in) in males and 330 to 362 mm (13.0 to 14.3 in) in females. Body mass of 15 males was found to be merely 357 to 600 g (0.787 to 1.323 lb) with a mean of 501 g (1.105 lb), the lowest adult weights known for this species, while two adult females scaled 1,000 and 1,170 g (2.20 and 2.58 lb), respectively, or more than twice as much on average. Beyond its smaller size, its wings are reportedly relatively shorter and feet relatively smaller and weaker than other Eurasian races. In colour, this race is typically a slate-grey above with a blackish head and is densely marked below with thin brown barring.
- A. g. fujiyamae Swann & Hartert, 1923 – Found through the species' range in Japan, from the islands of Hokkaido south to the large island of Honshu, in the latter down to as far south as forests a bit north of Hiroshima. A fairly small subspecies, it may average slightly smaller than A. g. schvedowi linearly, but it is less sexually dimorphic in size and weighs slightly more on average. The wing chord is the smallest known from any race, 286 to 300 mm (11.3 to 11.8 in) in males and 302 to 350 mm (11.9 to 13.8 in) in females. However, the weights of 22 males ranged from 602 to 848 g (1.327 to 1.870 lb), averaging 715 g (1.576 lb) while 22 females ranged from 929 to 1,265 g (2.048 to 2.789 lb), averaging 1,098 g (2.421 lb). The coloration of this race is not dissimilar from A. g. schvedowi, but is still darker slate above and they tend to have heavier barring below, probably being the darkest race on average, rivaled only by the similar insular race from the opposite side of the Pacific, A. a. laingi.

== Distribution and habitat ==
The Eurasian goshawk is distributed in Eurasia. It is found in most areas of Europe excluding Ireland and Iceland. It has a fairly spotty distribution in western Europe (e.g. Great Britain, Spain, France) but is more or less found continuously through the rest of the continent. Their Eurasian distribution sweeps continuously across most of Russia, excluding the fully treeless tundra in the northern stretches, to the western limits of Siberia as far as Anadyr and Kamchatka. In the Eastern Hemisphere, they are found in their southern limits in extreme northwestern Morocco, Corsica and Sardinia, the "toe" of Italy, southern Greece, Turkey, the Caucasus, Sinkiang's Tien Shan, in some parts of Tibet and the Himalayas (India and Nepal), western China and Japan. In winter, Eurasian goshawks may be found rarely as far south as Taif in Saudi Arabia and perhaps Tonkin, Vietnam.

Vagrants have been reported in Alaska in the United States, Newfoundland in Canada, Ireland, North Africa (central Morocco, northern Algeria, Tunisia, Libya, Egypt); the Arabian Peninsula (Israel, Jordan, Saudi Arabia), southwest Asia (southern Iran, Pakistan), western India (Gujarat), the Izu Islands archipelago in Japan, and the Commander Islands.

Eurasian goshawks can be found in both deciduous and coniferous forests. While the species might show strong regional preferences for certain trees, they seem to have no strong overall preferences nor even a preference between deciduous or coniferous trees despite claims to the contrary. Compared to American goshawk, the Eurasian goshawk may live in fairly urbanised patchworks of small woods, shelter-belts and copses and even use largely isolated trees in central parts of Eurasian cities, especially in central Europe. Even if they are far more wary of human presence than the Eurasian sparrowhawk, Eurasian goshawks are known to live in some relatively densely wooded areas of large cities of Central Europe, such as Berlin and Hamburg; it is a relatively new phenomenon that started in the 20th century.

The Eurasian goshawk can be found at almost any altitude, but recently is typically found at high elevations due to a paucity of extensive forests remaining in lowlands across much of its range. Altitudinally, goshawks may live anywhere up to a given mountain range's tree line, which is usually 3,000 m (9,800 ft) in elevation or less. The northern limit of their distribution also coincides with the tree line and here may adapt to dwarf tree communities, often along drainages of the lower tundra. In winter months, the northernmost or high mountain populations move down to warmer forests with lower elevations, often continuing to avoid detection except while migrating. A majority of goshawks remain sedentary throughout the year.

Although favouring forests, goshawks may be found in other areas. An example of goshawks occurring as urban wildlife can be found in Japan, where a population of the species lives and breeds in the Imperial Palace gardens in Tokyo, alongside a number of other species of birds of prey and owls; it is believed that the birds have managed to thrive in the dense urban environment due to tree-planting initiatives and control measures being imposed against urban crows. Goshawks were first recorded breeding in this location in 2001, when a nest was found in an evergreen oak (Quercus acuta) tree.

== Description ==
The Eurasian goshawk has relatively short, broad wings and a long tail, typical for Astur species and common to raptors that require maneuverability within forest habitats. For an Astur, it has a relatively sizeable bill, relatively long wings, a relatively short tail, robust and fairly short legs and particularly thick toes. Across most of the species' range, it is blue-grey above or brownish-grey with dark barring or streaking over a grey or white base colour below, but Asian subspecies in particular range from nearly white overall to nearly black above. Goshawks tend to show clinal variation in colour, with most goshawks further north being paler and those in warmer areas being darker but individuals can be either dark in the north or pale in the south. Individuals that live a long life may gradually become paler as they age, manifesting in mottling and a lightening of the back from a darker shade to a bluer pale colour. Its plumage is more variable than that of the Eurasian sparrowhawk (Accipiter nisus), which is probably due to higher genetic variability in the larger goshawk. The juvenile Eurasian goshawk is usually a solid to mildly streaky brown above, with many variations in underside colour from nearly pure white to almost entirely overlaid with broad dark cinnamon-brown striping. Both juveniles and adults have a barred tail, with 3 to 5 dark brown or black bars. Adults always have a white eye stripe or supercilia, which tends to be broader in northern Eurasian and North American birds. In Europe and Asia, juveniles have pale-yellow eyes while adults typically develop orange-coloured eyes, though some may have only brighter yellow or occasionally ochre or brownish eye colour. Moulting starts between late March and late May, the male tends to moult later and faster than the female. Moulting results in the female being especially likely to have a gap in its wing feathers while incubating and this may cause some risk, especially if the male is lost, as it inhibits her hunting abilities and may hamper her defensive capabilities, putting both herself and the nestlings in potential danger of predation. The moult takes a total of 4–6 months, with tail feathers following the wings then lastly the contour and body feathers, which may not be completely moulted even as late as October.

Although existing wing size and body mass measurements indicate that the Henst's goshawk (Astur henstii) and Meyer's goshawk (Astur meyerianus) broadly overlap in size with this species, the Eurasian goshawk is on average the largest member of the genus Astur, especially outsizing its tropic cousins in the larger Eurasian subspecies. The Eurasian goshawk, like all Astur species, exhibits sexual dimorphism, where females are significantly larger than males, with the dimorphism notably greater in most parts of Eurasia. Linearly, males average about 8% smaller in the North American species, and 13% smaller than females in Eurasia, but in the latter landmass can range up to a very noticeable 28% difference in extreme cases. Male Eurasian goshawks are 46 to 63 cm (18 to 25 in) long and have a 89 to 122 cm (35 to 48 in) wingspan. The female is much larger, 58 to 69 cm (23 to 27 in) long with a 108 to 127 cm (43 to 50 in) wingspan. Males average around 762 g (1.680 lb) in body mass, with a range from all races of 357 to 1,200 g (0.787 to 2.646 lb). The female can be up to more than twice as heavy, averaging from the same races 1,150 g (2.54 lb) with an overall range of 758 to 2,200 g (1.671 to 4.850 lb). Among standard measurements, the most oft-measured is wing chord which can range from 286 to 354 mm (11.3 to 13.9 in) in males and from 324 to 390 mm (12.8 to 15.4 in) in females. Additional, the tail is 200–295 mm (7.9–11.6 in), the culmen is 20–26.3 mm (0.79–1.04 in) and the tarsus is 68–90 mm (2.7–3.5 in).

=== Voice ===
Eurasian goshawk

Eurasian goshawks normally only call during courtship or the nesting season. Adult goshawks may chatter a repeated note, varying in speed and volume based on the context. When calling from a perch, birds often turn their heads slowly from side to side, producing a ventriloquial effect. The male calls a fast, high-pitched kew-kew-kew when delivering food or else a very different croaking guck or chup. The latter sound has been considered by some authors similar to that of a person snapping the tongue away from the roof the mouth; the males produce it by holding the beak wide open, thrusting the head up and forward, then bringing it down as the sound is emitted, repeated at intervals of five seconds. This call is uttered when the male encounters a female. In a study in France, calling mainly peaked in late courtship/early nesting around late March to April, can begin up to 45 minutes before sunrise, and are more than twice in as frequent in the first three hours of daylight as in the rest of the day. Occasionally hunting Eurasian goshawks may make shrill screams when pursuing prey, especially if a lengthy chase is undertaken and the prey is already aware of its intended predator.

=== Similar species ===
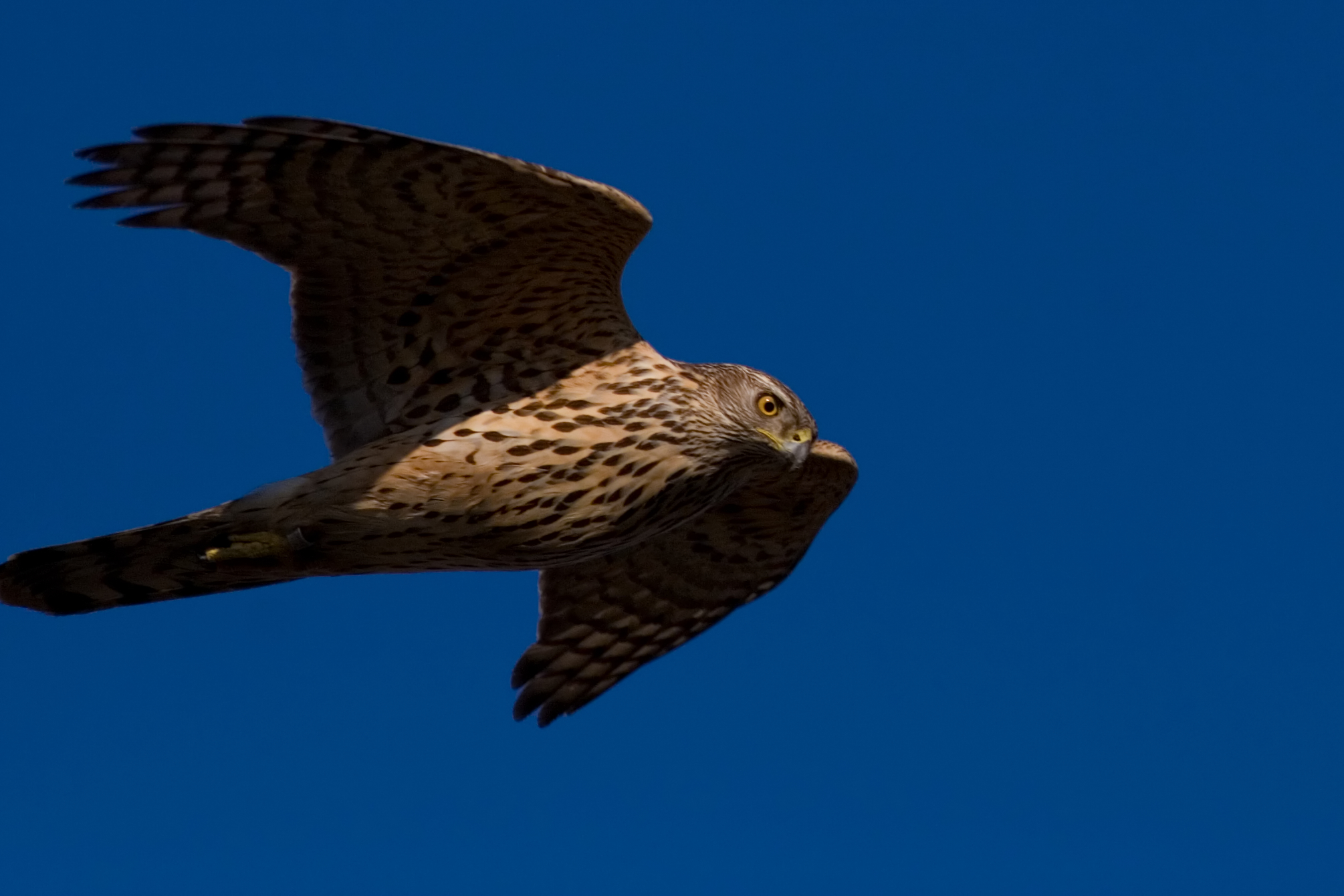
Juvenile in flight, the most likely age and condition to mistake a goshawk for another species

The juvenile plumage of the species may cause some confusion, especially with juveniles of other hawk species. Unlike other northern hawks, such as the male Eurasian sparrowhawk (Accipiter nisus), the adult Eurasian goshawk never has a rusty colour to its underside barring. The smaller male goshawk is sometimes confused with a female Eurasian sparrowhawk, but is still notably larger, much bulkier and has relatively longer wings, which are more pointed and less boxy. Sparrowhawks tend to fly in a frequently flapping, fluttering type flight, while the wing beats of goshawks are deeper, more deliberate, and on average slower than those of the sparrowhawk. The classic flight style of sparrowhawks and goshawks is a characteristic "flap flap, glide", but the goshawk, with its greater wing area, can sometimes be seen steadily soaring in migration (smaller hawks almost always need to flap to stay aloft). Rarely, in the southern stretches of its Asian wintering range, the Eurasian goshawk may live alongside the crested goshawk (Lophospiza trivirgata) which is smaller (roughly Cooper's hawk-sized) and has a slight crest as well as a distinct mixture of denser streaks and bars below and no supercilia.

== Behaviour ==
=== Territoriality ===
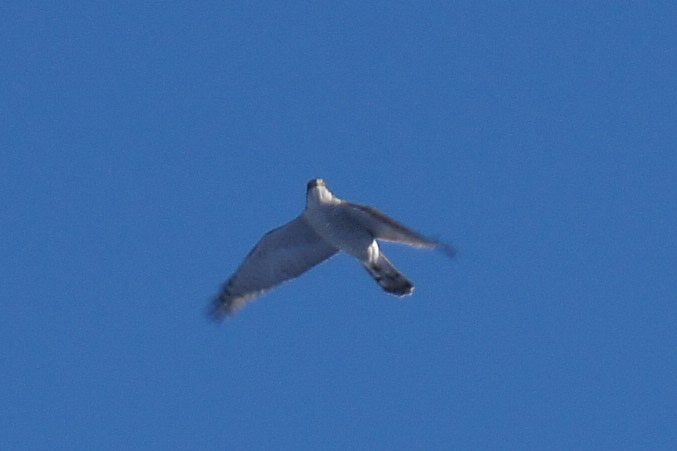
Adult goshawks maintain territories with display flights.

The Eurasian goshawk is always found solitarily or in pairs. This species is highly territorial, as are most raptorial birds, maintaining regularly spaced home ranges that constitute their territory. Territories are maintained by adults in display flights. During nesting, the home ranges of goshawk pairs are from 600 to 4,000 ha (1,500 to 9,900 acres) and these vicinities tend to be vigorously defended both to maintain rights to their nests and mates as well as the ranges' prey base. During display flight goshawks may engage in single or mutual high-circling. Each sex tends to defend the territory from others of their own sex. Territorial flights may occur throughout most of the year, but peak from January to April. Such flights may include slow-flapping with exaggerated high deep beats interspersed with long glides and undulations. In general, territorial fights are resolved without physical contact, often with one (usually a younger bird seeking a territory) retreating while the other approaches in a harrier-like warning flight, flashing its white underside at the intruder. If the incoming goshawk does not leave the vicinity, the defending goshawk may increase the exaggerated quality of its flight including a mildly undulating wave-formed rowing flight and the rowing flight with its neck held in a heron-like S to elevate the head and maximally expose the pale breast as a territorial threat display. Territorial skirmishes may on occasion escalate to physical fights in which mortalities may occur. In actual fights, goshawks fall grappling to the ground as they attempt to strike each other with talons.

=== Migration ===
Although at times considered rather sedentary for a northern raptor species, the Eurasian goshawk is a partial migrant. Migratory movements generally occur between September and November (occasionally extending throughout December) in the fall and February to April in the spring. Spring migration is less extensive and more poorly known than fall migration, but seems to peak late March to early April. Some birds, up to as far north as central Scandinavia, may remain in their territory throughout the winter. Eurasian goshawks from northern Fennoscandia have been recorded traveling up to 1,640 km (1,020 mi) away from first banding but adults are seldom recorded more than 300 km (190 mi) from their summer range. In Sweden, young birds distributed an average of 377 km (234 mi) in the north to an average of 70 km (43 mi) in the south. In northern Sweden, young generally disperse somewhat south, whereas in south and central Sweden, they are typically distributed to the south (but not usually across the 5-km Kattegat straits). On the other hand, 4.3% of the southern Swedish goshawks actually moved north. Migrating goshawks seem to avoid crossing water, but sparrowhawks seem to do so more regularly. In central Europe, few birds travel more than 30 km (19 mi) throughout the year, a few juveniles have exceptionally been recorded traveling up to 300 km (190 mi). In Eurasia, very small numbers of migratory Eurasian goshawks cross the Strait of Gibraltar and Bosporus in autumn but further east more significant winter range expansions may extend from northern Iran and southern Turkmenia to Aral and Balkhash lakes, from Kashmir to Assam, extreme northwestern Thailand, northern Vietnam, southern China, Taiwan, Ryukyu Islands and South Korea.

== Food and feeding ==
=== Hunting behaviour ===
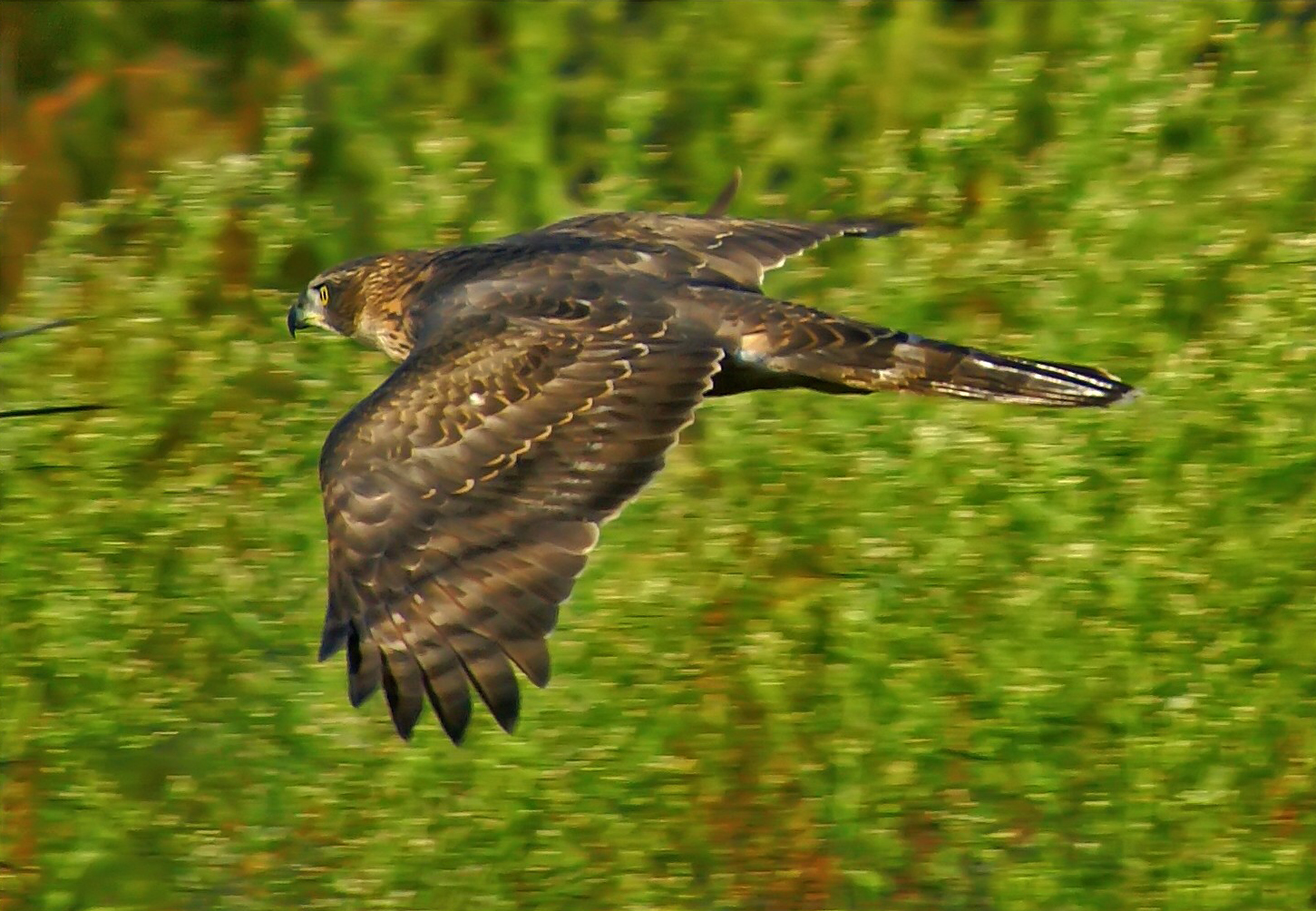
Goshawks are particularly agile hunters of the woodlands.

As typical of the genus Astur (as well as Accipiter, Tachyspiza and other distantly related forest-dwelling raptors of various lineages), the Eurasian goshawk has relatively short wings and a long tail which make it ideally adapted to engaging in brief but agile and twisting hunting flights through dense vegetation of wooded environments. This species is a powerful hunter, taking birds and mammals in a variety of woodland habitats, often using a combination of speed and obstructing cover to ambush their victims. Goshawks often forage in adjoining habitat types, such as the edge of a forest and meadow. Hunting habitat can be variable, as in a comparison of habitats used in England found that only 8% of landscapes used were woodlands whereas in Sweden 73-76% of the habitat used was woodland, albeit normally within 200 m (660 ft) of an opening. One study from central Sweden found that locally goshawks typically hunt within the largest patches of mature forests, selecting second growth forest less than half as often as its prevalence in the local environment. The Eurasian goshawk is typically considered a perch-hunter. Hunting efforts are punctuated by a series of quick flights low to the ground, interspersed with brief periods of scanning for unsuspecting prey from elevated perches (short duration sit-and-wait predatory movements). These flights are meant to be inconspicuous, averaging about 83 seconds in males and 94 seconds in females, and prey pursuits may be abandoned if the victims become aware of the goshawk too quickly. More sporadically, Eurasian goshawks may watch for prey from a high soar or gliding flight above the canopy. One study in Germany found an exceptional 80% of hunting efforts to be done from a high soar but the author admitted that he was probably biased by the conspicuousness of this method. In comparison, a study from Great Britain found that 95% of hunting efforts were from perches. A strong bias for pigeons as prey and a largely urbanised environment in Germany explains the local prevalence of hunting from a soaring flight, as the urban environment provides ample thermals and obstructing tall buildings which are ideal for hunting pigeons on the wing.

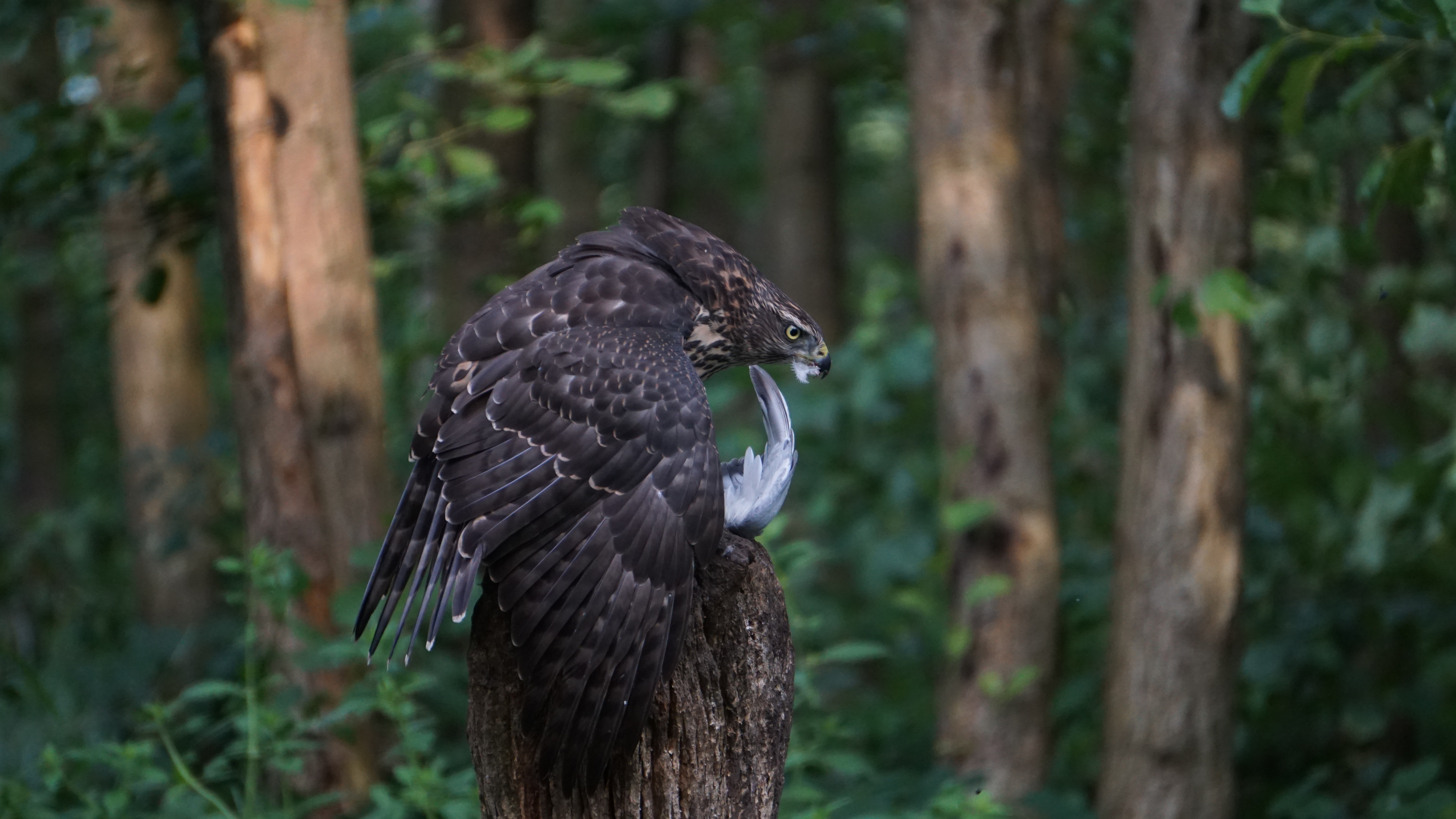
A juvenile goshawk beginning to pluck its prey, a likely feral pigeon

Eurasian goshawks rarely vary from their perch-hunting style that typifies the initial part of their hunt but seems to be able to show nearly endless variation to the concluding pursuit. Hunting goshawks seem to not only use thick vegetation to block them from view for their prey (as typical of Astur and Accipiter species) but, while hunting flying birds, they seem to be able to adjust their flight level so the prey is unable to see its hunter past their own tails. Once a prey item is selected, a short tail-chase may occur. The Eurasian goshawk is capable of considerable, sustained, horizontal speed in pursuit of prey with speeds of 38 mph (61 km/h) reported. While pursuing prey, Eurasian goshawks has been described both "reckless" and "fearless", able to pursue their prey through nearly any conditions. There are various times goshawks have been observed going on foot to pursue prey, at times running without hesitation (in a crow-like, but more hurried gait) into dense thickets and brambles (especially in pursuit of galliforms trying to escape), as well as into water (i.e. usually waterfowl). Anecdotal cases have been reported when goshawks have pursue domestic prey into barns and even houses.

Prey pursuits may become rather prolonged depending upon the goshawk's determination and hunger, ranging up to 15 minutes while harrying a terrified, agile squirrel or hare, and occasional pair hunting may benefit goshawks going after agile prey. As is recorded in many accipitrids, hunting in pairs (or "tandem hunting") normally consist of a breeding pair, with one bird flying conspicuously to distract the prey, while the other swoops in from behind to ambush the victim. Prey is killed by driving the talons into the quarry and squeezing while the head is held back to avoid flailing limbs, frequently followed by a kneading action until the prey stops struggling. Kills are normally consumed on the ground by juvenile or non-breeding goshawks (more rarely an elevated perch or old nest) or taken to a low perch by breeding goshawks. Habitual perches are used for dismantling prey especially in the breeding season, often called "plucking perches", which may be fallen logs, bent-over trees, stumps or rocks and can see years of usage. Eurasian goshawks often leave larger portions of their prey uneaten than other raptors, with limbs, many feathers and fur and other body parts strewn near kill sites and plucking perches, and are helpful to distinguish their kills from other raptors such as large owls, who usually eat everything. The daily food requirements of a single goshawks are around 120 to 150 g (4.2 to 5.3 oz) and most kills can feed a goshawk for 1 to 3 days. Eurasian goshawks sometimes cache prey on tree branches or wedged in a crotch between branches for up to 32 hours. This is done primarily during the nestling stage. Hunting success rates have been very roughly estimated at 15–30%, within average range for a bird of prey, but may be reported as higher elsewhere. One study claimed hunting success rates for pursuing rabbits was 60% and corvids was 63.8%.

=== Prey spectrum ===
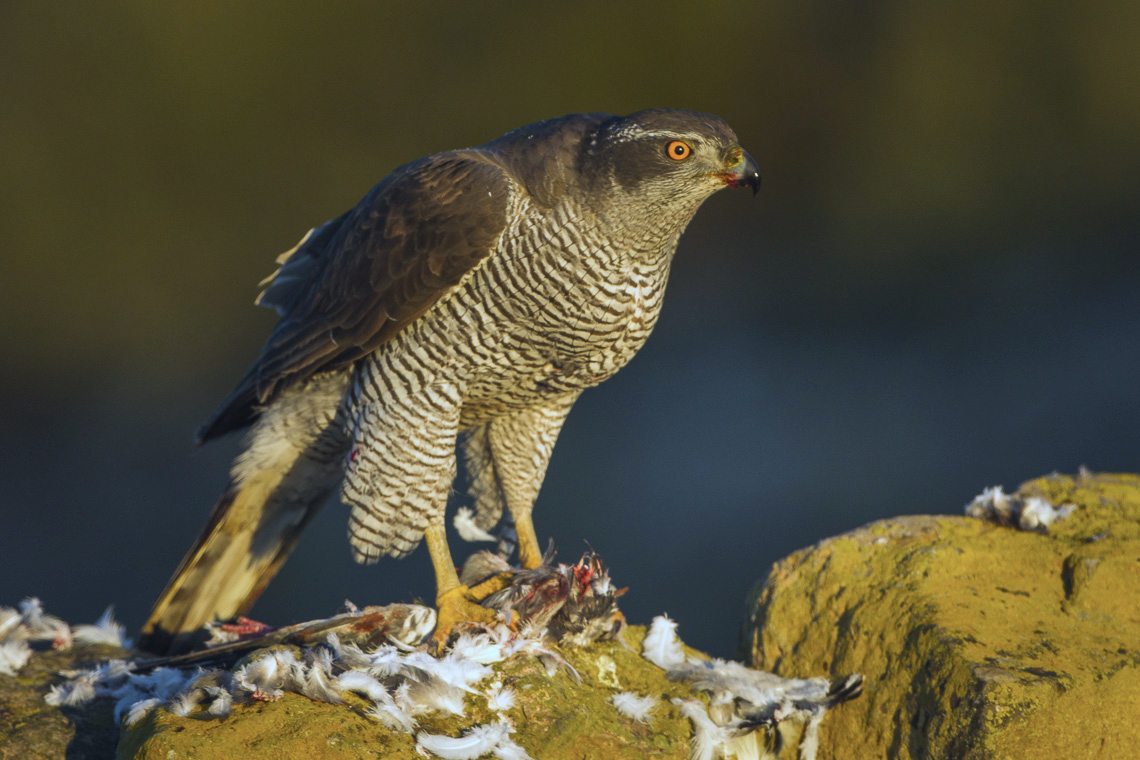
Eurasian goshawks most often prey on birds

Eurasian goshawks are usually opportunistic predators, as are most birds of prey. The most important prey species are small to medium-sized mammals and medium to large-sized birds found in forest, edge and scrub habitats. Primary prey selection varies considerably not just at the regional but also the individual level as the primary food species can be dramatically different in nests just a few kilometers apart. As is typical in various birds of prey, small prey tends to be underrepresented in prey remains below habitual perches and nests (as only present in skeletal remains within pellets) whereas pellets underrepresent large prey (which is usually dismantled away from the nest) and so a combined study of both remains and pellets is recommended to get a full picture of goshawks' diets. Prey selection also varies by season and a majority of dietary studies are conducted within the breeding season, leaving a possibility of bias for male-selected prey, whereas recent advanced in radio-tagging have allowed a broader picture of goshawks' fairly different winter diet (without needing to kill goshawks to examine their stomach contents). Eurasian goshawks have a varied diet that has reportedly included over 500 species from across its range, and at times their prey spectrum can extend to nearly any available kind of bird or mammal except the particularly large varieties as well as atypical prey including reptiles and amphibians, fish and insects. However, a few prey families dominate the diet in most parts of the range, mainly corvids, pigeons, grouse, pheasants, thrushes and woodpeckers (in roughly descending order of importance) among birds and squirrels (mainly tree squirrels but also ground squirrels) and rabbits and hares among mammals.

Birds are usually the primary prey in Europe, constituting 76.5% of the diet in 17 studies. Studies have shown that from several parts of the Eurasian continent from Spain to the Ural Mountains mammals contributed only about 9% of the breeding season diet. However, mammals may be slightly underrepresented in this data because of the little-studied presence of mammals as a food source in winter, particularly in the western and southern portions of Europe where the lack of snowfall can allow large numbers of rabbits. Staple prey for Eurasian goshawks usually weighs between 50 and 2,000 g (1.8 and 70.5 oz), with average prey weights per individual studies typically between 215 and 770 g (7.6 and 27.2 oz). In the Netherlands, male prey averaged 277 g (9.8 oz) whereas female prey averaged 505 g (17.8 oz), thus a rough 45% difference. Eurasian goshawks often select young prey during spring and summer, attacking both nestling and fledgling birds and infant and yearling mammals, as such prey is often easiest to catch and convenient to bring to the nest. In general, goshawks in Fennoscandia shift their prey selection to when the birds produce their young; first waterfowl, then quickly to corvids and thrushes and then lastly to grouse, even though adults are also freely caught opportunistically for all these prey types. This is fairly different from Vendsyssel, Denmark, where mostly adult birds were caught except for thrushes and corvids, as in these two groups, the goshawks caught mostly fledglings.

=== Corvids ===
Overall, one prey family that is known to be taken in nearly every part of the goshawk's range is the corvids, although they do not necessarily dominate the diet in all areas. Some 24 species have been reported in the diet of Eurasian and American goshawks. The second most commonly reported prey species in breeding season dietary studies from Europe is the 160 g (5.6 oz) Eurasian jay (Garrulus glandarius). These species were recorded in studies from northeastern Poland and the Apennines of Italy (where the Eurasian jays made up a quarter of the food by number) as the main prey species by number. The conspicuously loud calls, somewhat sluggish flight (when hunting adult or post-fledging individuals) and moderate size of these jays make them ideal for prey-gathering male goshawks. Another medium-sized corvid, the 218 g (7.7 oz) Eurasian magpie (Pica pica) is also amongst the most widely reported secondary prey species for goshawks there. Magpies, like large jays, are rather slow fliers and can be handily outpaced by a pursuing goshawk. Some authors claim that taking of large corvids is a rare behaviour, due to their intelligence and complex sociality which in turn impart formidable group defenses and mobbing capabilities. One estimation claimed this to be done by about 1–2% of adult goshawks during the breeding season (based largely on studies from Sweden and England), however, on the contrary many goshawks do routinely hunt crows and similar species. In fact, there are some recorded cases where goshawks were able to exploit such mobbing behaviour in order to trick crows into close range, where the mob victim suddenly turned to grab one predaceously. In the following areas Corvus species were the leading prey by number: the 440 g (16 oz) hooded crow (Corvus cornix) in the Ural Mountains (9% by number), the 245 g (8.6 oz) western jackdaw (Coloeus monedula) in Sierra de Guadarrama, Spain (36.4% by number), the 453 g (0.999 lb) rook (Corvus frugilegus) in the Zhambyl district, Kazakhstan (36.6% by number). Despite evidence that Eurasian goshawks avoid nesting near common ravens (Corvus corax), the largest widespread corvid (about the same size as a goshawk at 1,040 g (2.29 lb)) and a formidable opponent even one-on-one, they occasionally even prey on ravens.

=== Pigeons and doves ===
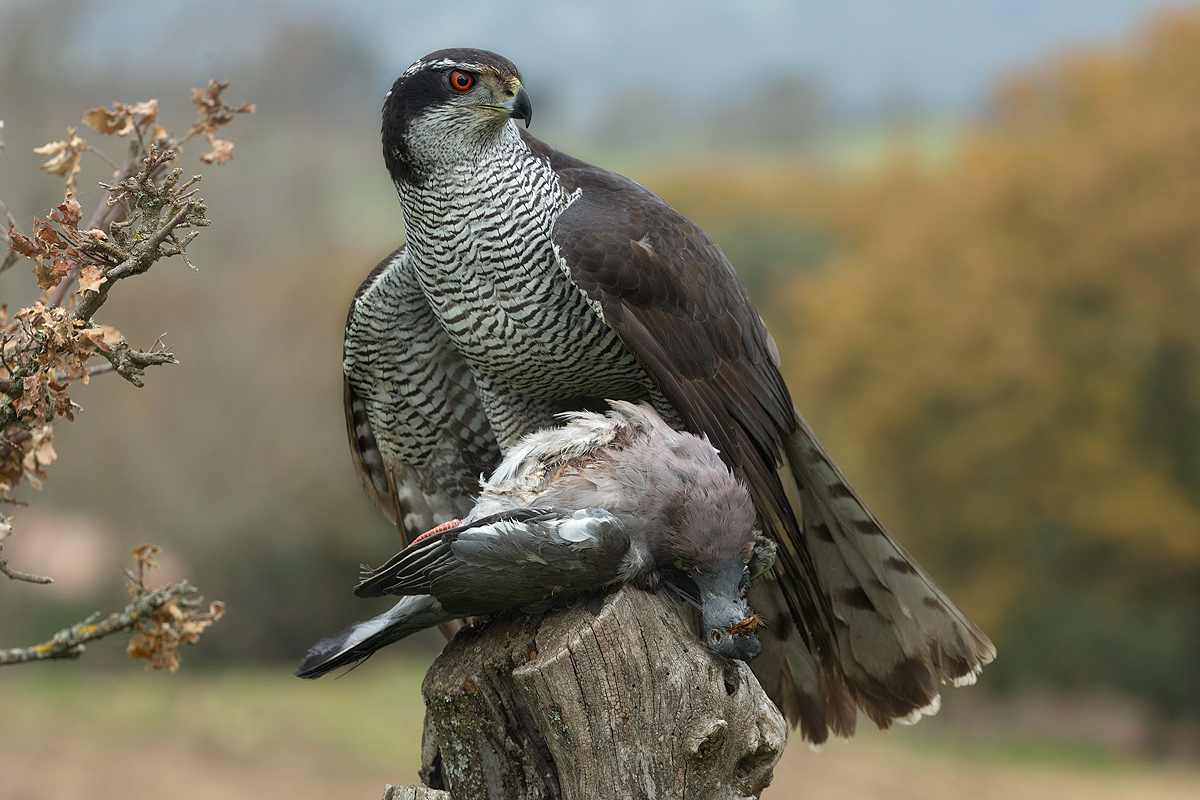
Adult on Corsica with its fresh prey, a common wood pigeon

In Europe, the leading prey species numerically (the main prey species in 41% of 32 European studies largely focused on the nesting season) is the 352 g (12.4 oz) rock pigeon (Columba livia). Although the predominance of rock pigeons in urban environments that host goshawks such as the German cities of Hamburg (where they constituted 36% by number and nearly 45% by weight of the local diet) or Cologne is predictable, evidence shows that these development-clinging pigeons are sought out even within ample conserved woodland from Portugal to Georgia. In areas where goshawk restrict their hunting forays to field and forest, they often catch another numerous pigeon, the 490 g (1.08 lb) common wood pigeon (Columba palumbus) (the largest pigeon the goshawk naturally encounters and is known to hunt). The latter species was the main prey in the diet of goshawks in the Germany-Netherlands border area (37.7% of 4125 prey items) and Wales (25.1% by number and 30.5% by biomass of total prey). It has been suggested that male goshawks in peri-urban regions may be better suited with their higher agility to ambushing feral pigeons in and amongst various manmade structures whereas females may be better suited due to the higher overall speeds to taking out common wood pigeons, as these typically forage in wood-cloaked but relatively open fields; however males are efficient predators of common wood-pigeons as well. Studies have proven that, while hunting feral pigeons, goshawks quite often select the oddly coloured pigeons out of flocks as prey, whether the plumage of the flock is predominantly dark or light hued, they disproportionately often select individuals of the other colour. This preference is apparently more pronounced in older, experienced goshawks and there is some evidence that the males who select oddly-coloured pigeons have higher average productivity during breeding.

=== Gamebirds ===
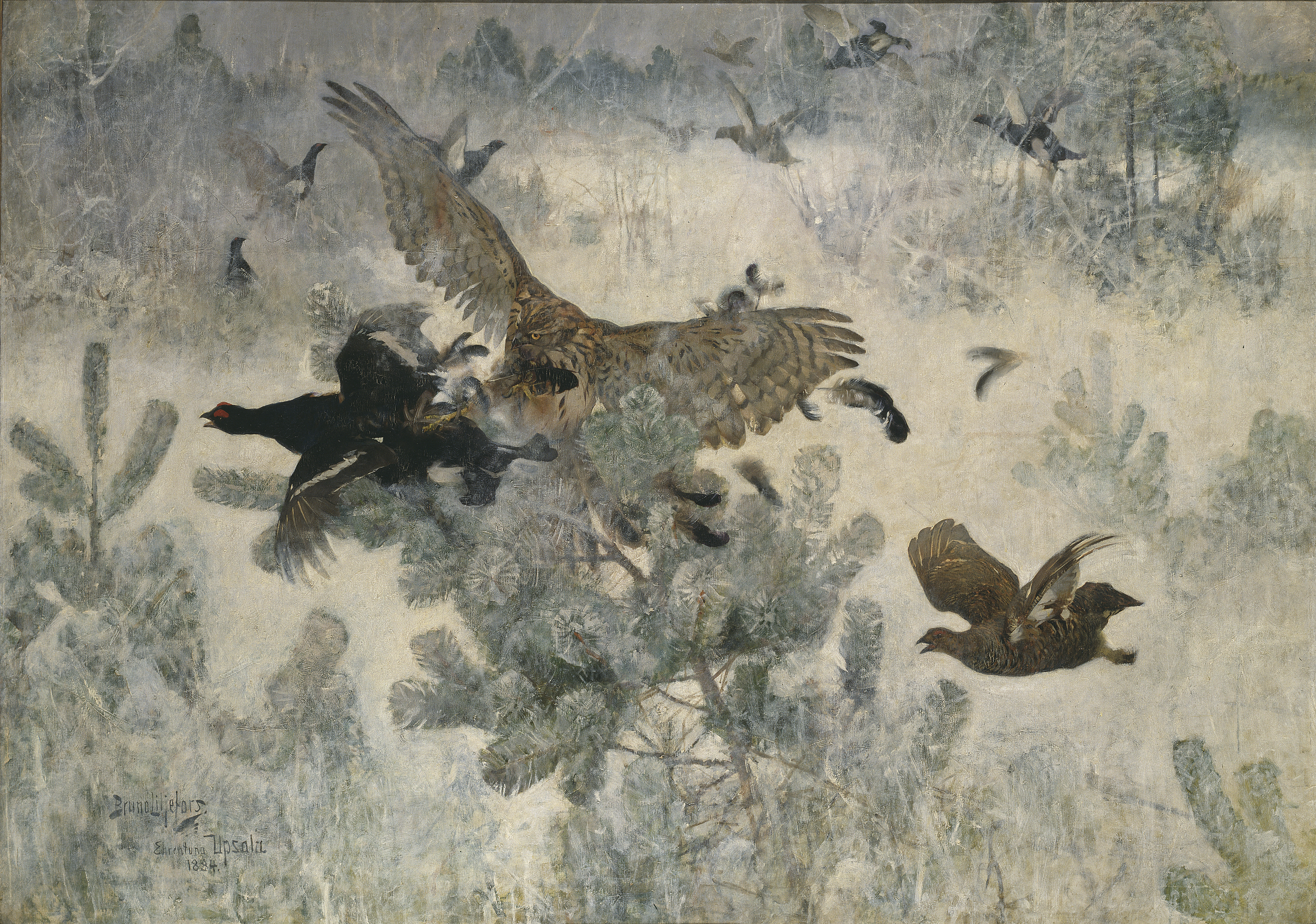
Hawk and Black-Game (Bruno Liljefors, 1884), a painting of a goshawk at the moment of catching a black grouse

The Eurasian goshawk is in some parts of its range considered a specialised predator of gamebirds, particularly grouse. All told 33 species of this order have turned up in Eurasian and American goshawks' diets, including most of the species either native to or introduced in North America and Europe. Numerically, only in the well-studied taiga habitats of Scandinavia do grouse typically take a dominant position. Elsewhere in the range, gamebirds are often secondary in number but often remain one of the most important contributors of prey biomass to nests. With their general ground-dwelling habits, gamebirds tend to be fairly easy for goshawks to overtake if they remain unseen and, if made aware of the goshawk, the prey chooses to run rather than fly. If frightened too soon, gamebirds may take flight and may be chased for some time, although the capture rates are reduced considerably when this occurs. Pre-fledgling chicks of gamebirds are particularly vulnerable due to the fact that they can only run when being pursued. In several parts of Scandinavia, forest grouse have historically been important prey for goshawks both in and out of the nesting season, principally the 1,080 g (2.38 lb) black grouse (Lyrurus tetrix) and the 430 g (15 oz) hazel grouse (Tetrastes bonasia) followed in numbers by larger 2,950 g (6.50 lb) western capercaillies (Tetrao urogallus) and the 570 g (1.26 lb) willow ptarmigan (Lagopus lagopus) which replace the other species in the lower tundra zone. The impression of goshawks on the populations of this prey is considerable, possibly the most impactful of any predator in northern Europe considering their proficiency as predators and similarity of habitat selection to forest grouse. An estimated 25-26% of adult hazel grouse in Finnish and Swedish populations in a few studies fall victim to goshawks, whereas about 14% of adult black grouse are lost to this predator. Lesser numbers were reportedly culled in one study from northern Finland. However, adult grouse are less important in the breeding season diet than young birds, an estimated 30% of grouse taken by Scandinavian goshawks in summer were neonatal chicks whereas 53% were about fledgling age, the remaining 17% being adult grouse. This is fairly different from in southeastern Alaska, where grouse are similarly as important as in Fennoscandia, as 32.1% of avian prey deliveries were adults, 14.4% were fledglings and 53.5% were nestlings.

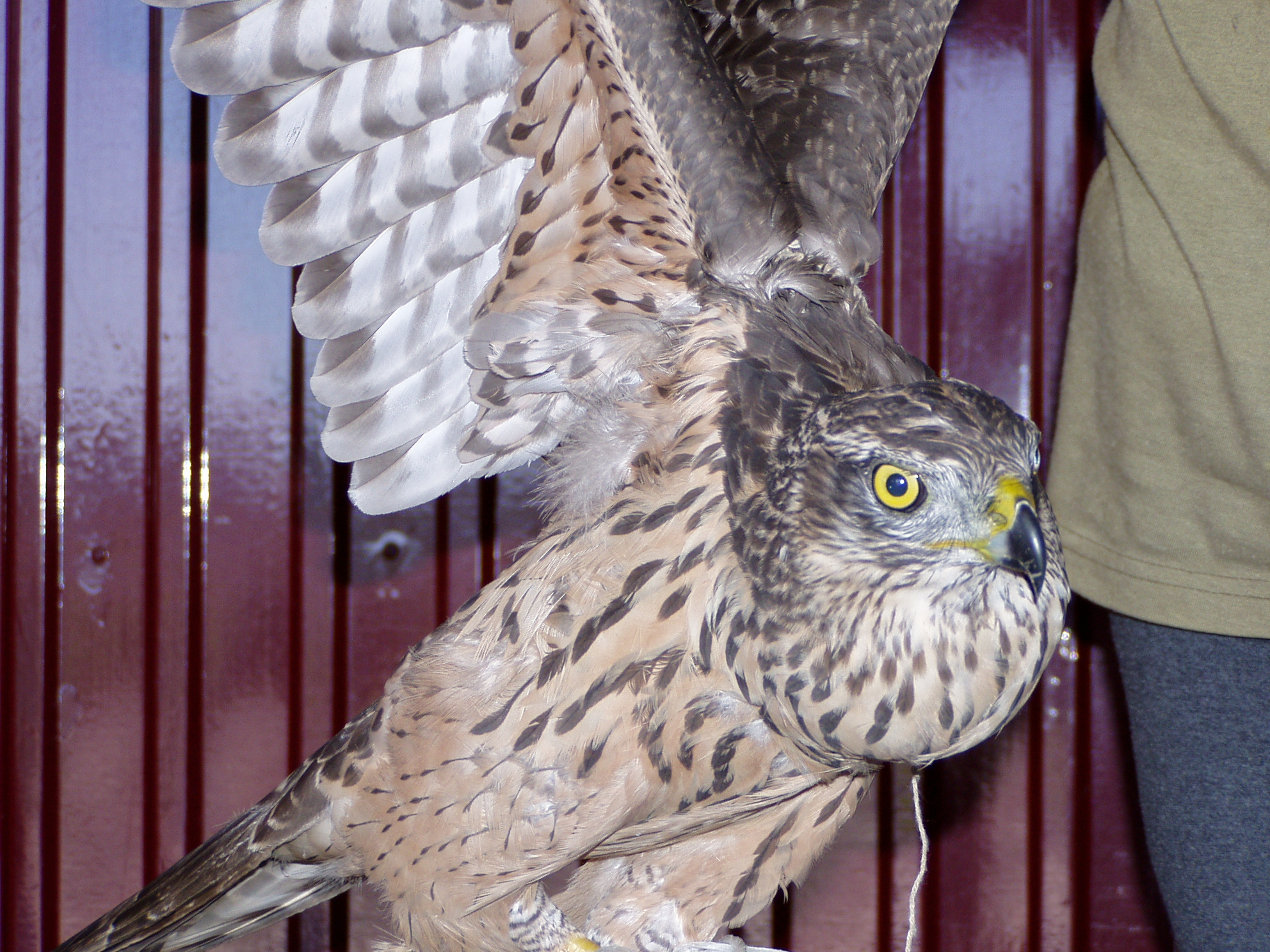
Goshawks sometimes become habitual fowl killers. This juvenile was caught pursuing chickens inside a hen house.

Eurasian goshawks can show somewhat of a trend for females to be taken more so than males while hunting adult gamebirds, due to the larger size and more developed defenses of males (such as leg spurs present for defense and interspecies conflicts in male of most pheasant species). Some authors have claimed this of male ring-necked pheasant (Phasianus colchicus), but these trends are not reported everywhere, as in southern Sweden equal numbers of adult male and female ring-necked pheasants, both sexes averaging 1,135 g (2.502 lb), were taken. While male goshawks can take black and hazel grouse of any age and thence deliver them to nests, they can only take capercaillie of up to adult hen size, averaging some 1,800 g (4.0 lb), the cock capercaillie at more than twice as heavy as the hen is too large for a male goshawk to overtake. However, adult female goshawks have been reported attacking and killing cock capercaillie, mainly during winter. These average about 4,000 g (8.8 lb) in body mass and occasionally may weigh even more when dispatched. Similarly impressive feats of attacks on other particularly large gamebirds have been reported elsewhere in the range, including the 2,770 g (6.11 lb) Altai snowcock (Tetraogallus altaicus) in Mongolia At the other end of the size scale, the smallest gamebird known to be hunted by Eurasian goshawk was the 96 g (3.4 oz) common quail (Coturnix coturnix). Domestic fowl, particularly chickens (Gallus gallus domesticus) are taken occasionally, especially where wild prey populations are depleted. While other raptors are at times blamed for large numbers of attacks on fowl, goshawks are reportedly rather more likely to attack chickens during the day than other raptors and are probably the most habitual avian predator of domestic fowl, at least in the temperate-zone. Particularly large numbers of chickens have been reported in Wigry National Park, Poland (4th most regular prey species and contributing 15.3% of prey weight), Belarus and the Ukraine, being the third most regularly reported prey in the latter two.

In a study of British goshawks, the red grouse (Lagopus scotica) was found to be the leading prey species (26.2% of prey by number). In La Segarra, Spain, the 528 g (1.164 lb) red-legged partridge (Alectoris rufa) is the most commonly reported prey species (just over 18% by number and 24.5% by weight).

=== Squirrels ===
Among mammalian prey, indisputably the most significant by number are the squirrels. All told, 44 members of the Sciuridae have turned up in their foods. (Note: This includes Sciuridae species taken by the American goshawk, now treated as a separate species.) Tree squirrels are the most obviously co-habitants with goshawks and are indeed taken in high numbers. Alongside martens, Eurasian goshawks are perhaps the most efficient temperate-zone predators of tree squirrels. Goshawks are large and powerful enough to overtake even the heaviest tree squirrels unlike smaller Accipiters and have greater agility and endurance in pursuits than do most buteonine hawks, some of which like red-tailed hawks (Buteo jamaicensis) regularly pursue tree squirrels but have relatively low hunting success rates due to the agility of squirrels. The 296 g (10.4 oz) red squirrel (Sciurus vulgaris) is the most numerous mammalian prey in European studies and the sixth most often recorded prey species there overall. In Oulu, Finland during winter (24.6% by number), in Białowieża Forest, Poland (14.3%), in the Chřiby uplands of the Czech Republic (8.5%) and in Forêt de Bercé, France (12%) the red squirrel was the main prey species for goshawks.

=== Hares and rabbits ===
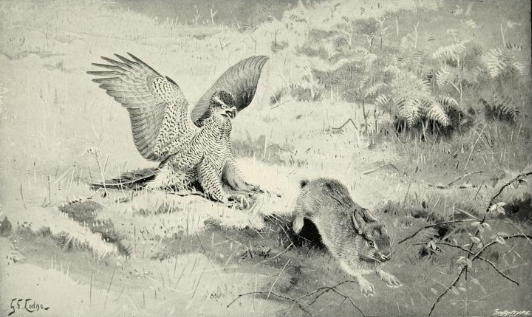
Illustrating a goshawk attempting to catch a rabbit, by G. E. Lodge

Eurasian goshawks can be locally heavy predators of lagomorphs, of which they take at least 15 species as prey. Especially in the Iberian peninsula, the native European rabbit (Oryctolagus cuniculus) is often delivered to nests and can be the most numerous prey. Even where taken secondarily in numbers in Spain to gamebirds such as in La Segarra, Spain, rabbits tend to be the most significant contributor of biomass to goshawk nests. On average, the weight of rabbits taken in La Segarra was 662 g (1.459 lb) (making up 38.4% of the prey biomass there), indicating most of the 333 rabbits taken there were yearlings and about 2-3 times lighter than a prime adult wild rabbit. In England, where the European rabbit is an introduced species, it was the third most numerous prey species at nests. In more snowbound areas where wild and feral rabbits are absent, larger hares may be taken and while perhaps more difficult to subdue than most typical goshawk prey, are a highly nutritious food source. In Finland, females were found to take mountain hare (Lepus timidus) fairly often and they were the second most numerous prey item for goshawks in winter (14.8% by number). In some parts of the range, larger leporids may be attacked, extending to the 3,800 g (8.4 lb) European hares (Lepus europaeus), as well as the mountain hare. In Europe, males have been recorded successfully attacking rabbits weighing up to 1,600 g (3.5 lb), or about 2.2 times their own weight, while adult mountain hares overtaken by female goshawks in Fennoscandia have weighed from 2,700 to 3,627 g (5.952 to 7.996 lb) or up to 2.4 times their own weight. Despite historic claims that taking prey so considerably larger than themselves is exceptional beyond a small region of Fennoscandia, there is evidence that as grouse numbers have mysteriously declined since 1960, adult mountain hare are increasingly the leading prey for wintering female goshawks, favouring and causing an increase of larger bodied females in order to overpower such a substantial catch. Eurasian goshawks also take about a half dozen species of pikas in Asia, much smaller cousins of rabbits and hares, but they are at best supplementary prey for American goshawks and of unknown importance to little-studied Eurasian goshawks.

=== Other birds ===
Some 21 species of woodpecker have been reported from Eurasian and American goshawk food studies around the world. With their relatively slow, undulating flight, adult and fledged woodpeckers can easily be overtaken by hunting goshawks, not to mention their habitat preferences frequently put them within active goshawk ranges. Most of the widespread species from Europe have been observed as prey, most commonly relatively large woodpeckers such as the 76 g (2.7 oz) great spotted woodpecker (Dendrocopos major) and the 176 g (6.2 oz) European green woodpecker (Picus viridis). All sizes of woodpeckers available are taken from the 19.8 g (0.70 oz) lesser spotted woodpecker (Dryobates minor) to the 321 g (11.3 oz) black woodpecker (Dryocopus martius). In many areas, Eurasian goshawks will pursue water birds of several varieties, although they rarely form a large portion of the diet. Perhaps the most often recorded water birds in the diet are ducks. All told, 32 waterfowl have been recorded in Eurasian and American goshawks' diet. In the Ural Mountains, the nearly cosmopolitan 1,075 g (2.370 lb) mallard (Anas platyrhynchos) was third most numerous prey species. The ducks of the genus Aythya are somewhat frequently recorded as well, especially since their tree-nesting habits may frequently put them in the hunting range of nesting goshawks. Similarly, the mandarin duck (Aix galericulata) from Asia may be more vulnerable than most waterfowl at their tree nests. Although etymologists feel that the goshawk is an abbreviation of "goose-hawk", geese are seldom taken considering their generally much larger size. Nonetheless, four species have been taken, including adults of species as large as the 2,420 g (5.34 lb) greater white-fronted goose (Anser albifrons). Adult common eiders (Somateria mollissima), the largest northern duck at 2,066 g (4.555 lb), have also been captured by goshawks. Various other water birds reported as taken include red-throated loon (Gavia stellata) chicks, adult little grebes (Tachybaptus ruficollis), adult great cormorants (Phalacrocorax carbo) (about the same size as a greater white-fronted goose), adult crested ibis (Nipponia nippon), black stork (Ciconia nigra) chicks and five species each of heron and rail. Among shorebirds (or small waders), Eurasian and American goshawks have been reported preying on more than 22 sandpipers, more than 8 plovers, more than 10 species each of gull and tern, more than 2 species of alcids and the Eurasian stone-curlew (Burhinus oedicnemus), the Eurasian oystercatcher (Haematopus ostralegus) and the long-tailed jaeger (Stercorarius longicaudus).

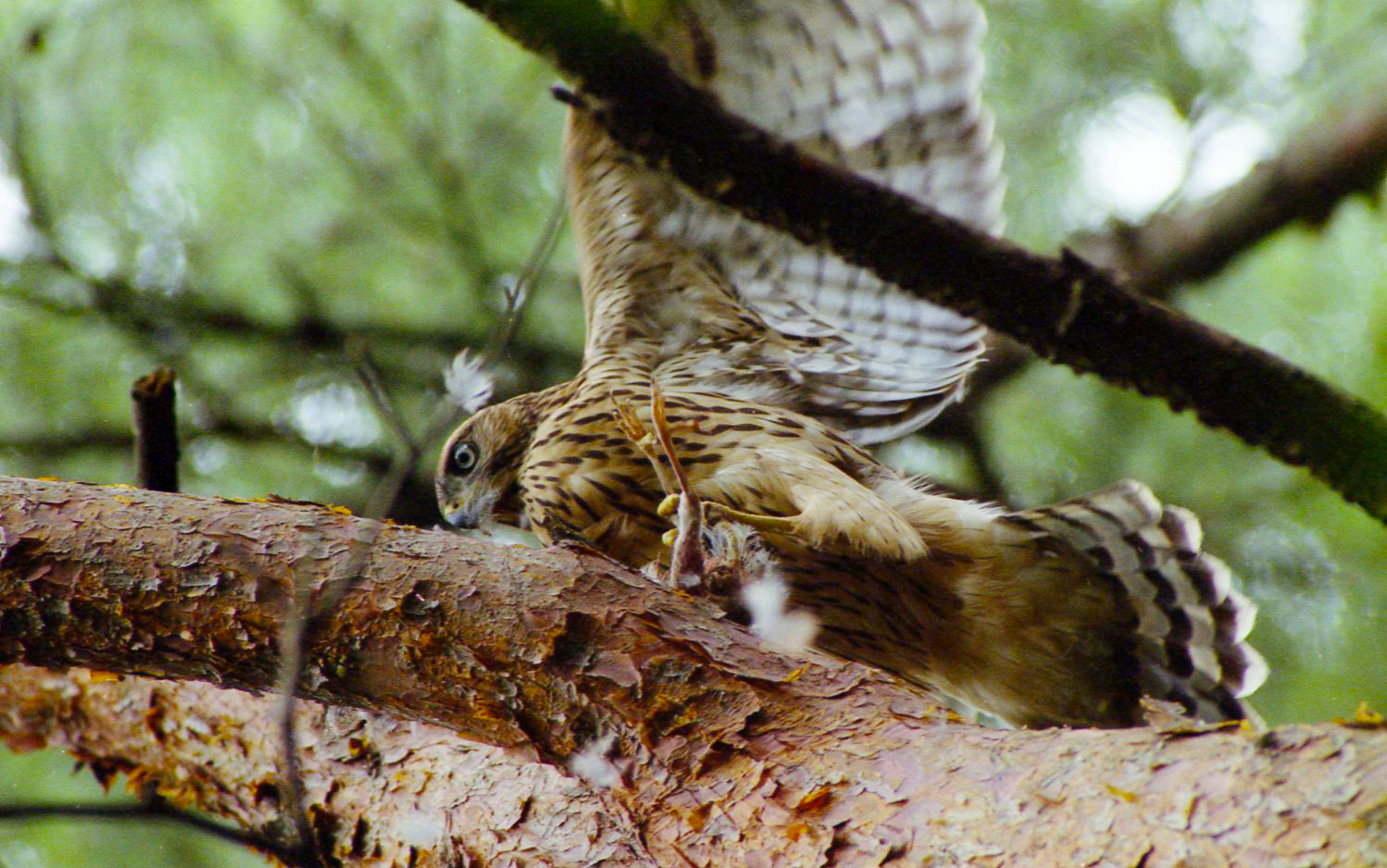
Juvenile in Japan with a young bird prey item

Corvids as aforementioned are quite important prey. Although they take fewer passerines than Accipiters do, smaller types of songbirds can still be regionally important to the diet. This is especially true of the thrushes which are often delivered to nests in Europe. 17 species of thrush have been identified in goshawk food across their range. The numerous 103 g (3.6 oz) Eurasian blackbird (Turdus merula) is often most reported from this family and can even be the main prey at some locations such as in the Netherlands (23.5% of prey by number) and in Norway (just over 14% by number and two studies showed thrushes collectively make up nearly half of the prey items in Norwegian nests). All common Turdus species are taken in some numbers in Europe, being quite regular and conspicuous in the woodland edge zones most often patrolled by male goshawks, especially while singing in spring and summer. Even where larger, more nutritious prey is present such as at pheasant release sites, the abundant thrushes are more often delivered to the nest because of the ease of capture such as in Norway. Thrush taken have ranged in size from some small birds to the 118 g (4.2 oz) mistle thrush (Turdus viscivorus), Europe's largest thrush. Beyond corvids and thrushes, most passerines encountered by Eurasian goshawks are substantially smaller and are often ignored under most circumstances in favour of more sizable prey. Nonetheless, more than a hundred passerines have been recorded their diet beyond these families. Most widespread passerine families from Europe have occasional losses to goshawks, including larks, swallows, nuthatches, treecreepers, wrens, warblers, flycatchers, pipits and wagtails, starlings, buntings, finches and sparrows. Avian prey has even ranged to as small as the 5.5 g (0.19 oz) goldcrest (Regulus regulus), one of the smallest birds in Europe. Among smaller types of passerines, one of the most widely reported are finches and, in some widespread studies, somewhat substantial numbers of finches of many species may actually be taken. Finches tend to fly more conspicuously as they cover longer distances, often bounding or undulating as they do, over the canopy than most forest songbirds, which may make them more susceptible to goshawk attacks than other small songbirds. Non-passerine upland birds taken by goshawks in small numbers include but are not limited to nightjars, swifts, bee-eaters, kingfishers, rollers, hoopoes and parrots.

=== Other mammals ===
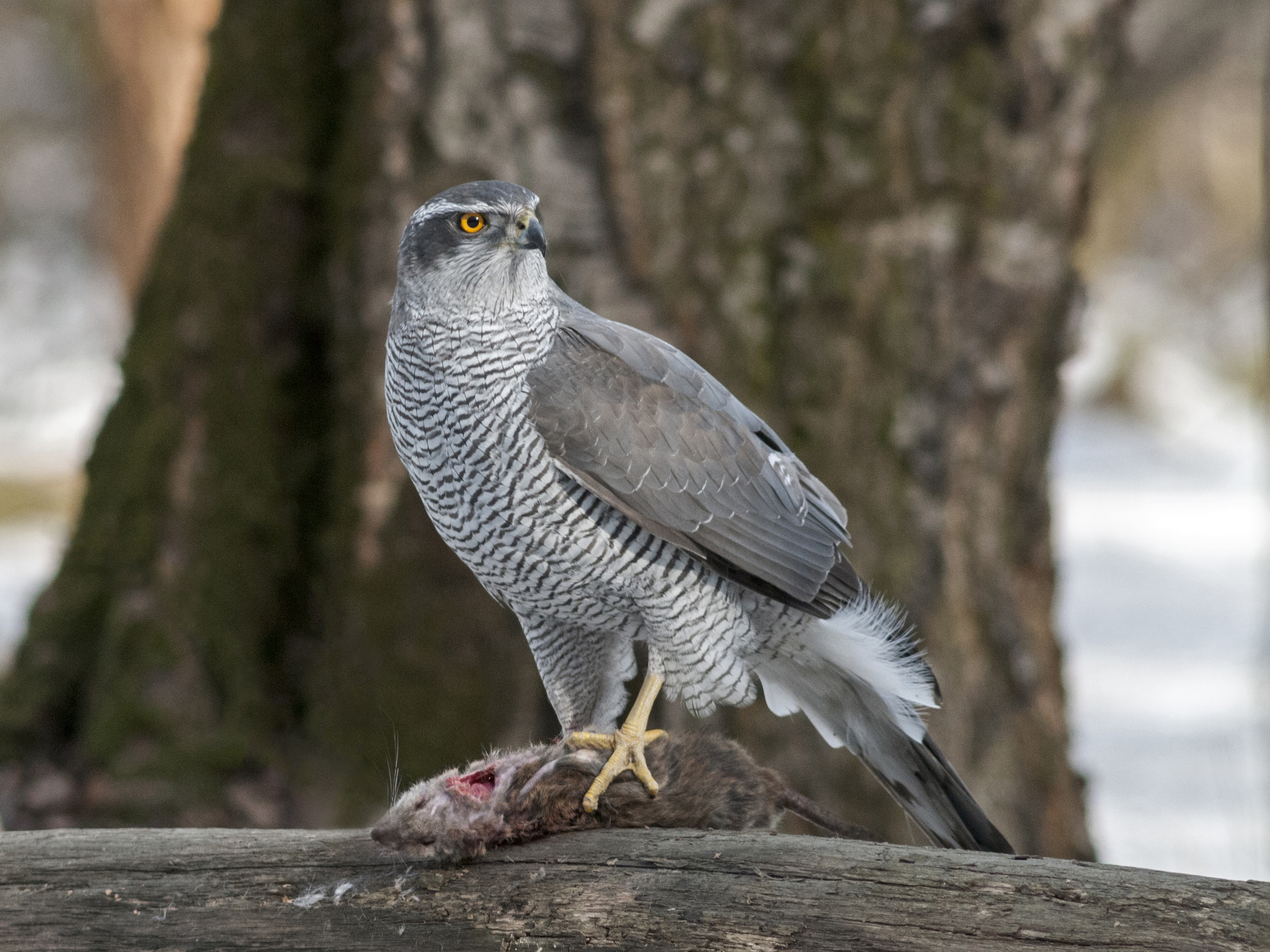
A goshawk preying on a brown rat in a fairly urban area of Moscow.

Outside of the squirrel family, relatively few other types of rodents are taken in many regions. Microtine rodents which are so essential to most northern non-accipitrine hawks and a majority of owls are at best a secondary contributor to goshawk diets, even though 26 species have been reported in their diet. Exceptionally, in a study of the Carpathian mountains of Ukraine, the 27.5 g (0.97 oz) common vole (Microtus arvalis) was the second most numerous prey species. Relatively high numbers of the 18.4 g (0.65 oz) bank vole (Clethrionomys glareolus) were reported in diets from Poland in Gmina Sobótka and the Białowieża Forest. Other miscellaneous rodents reported sporadically in the diet include dormice, Old World mice and rats, zokors, gophers and jirds.

Insectivores are taken in low numbers including moles, shrews and hedgehogs. Even more sporadically attacked by goshawks, given this prey's nocturnal habits, are bats. In one case a juvenile golden snub-nosed monkey (Rhinopithecus roxellana), which was successfully taken by a goshawk. Ungulates such as deer and sheep are sometimes consumed by goshawks but there is no evidence that they prey on live ones (as much larger accipitrids such as eagles can sometimes do), but these are more likely rare cases of scavenging on carrion, which may more regularly occur than once thought in areas with harsh winter weather.

=== Alternative prey ===
In a few cases, Eurasian goshawks have been recorded hunting and killing prey beyond birds and mammals. In some of the warmer drier extensions of their range, reptiles may be available to them to hunt. Only one species of snake is recorded from their diet, the small innocuous grass snake (Natrix natrix), at 66 g (2.3 oz); however about a half dozen lizards are recorded in their diet, primarily from the Iberian peninsula but also from the Ural mountains. The only known location in the Eurasian goshawk's range where reptiles were taken in large numbers was Sierra de Guadarrama, Spain, where the 77 g (2.7 oz) ocellated lizard (Timon lepidus) was the second most numerous prey species. Amphibians are even rarer in the diet, only recorded more than singly in one study each from Spain and from England. Fish are similarly rare in the diet, recorded twice each in Bavaria and Belarus. A few pellets have included remains of insects, much of which may be ingested incidentally or via the stomachs of birds that they have consumed. However, there is some evidence they at times will hunt large ground-dwelling insects such as dung beetles.

=== Interspecies predatory relationships ===
Eurasian goshawks are often near the top of the avian food chain in forested biomes but face competition for food resources from various other predators, including both birds and mammals. Comparative dietary studies have shown that the mean sizes of prey, both in terms of its size relative to the raptor itself and absolute weight, for goshawks is relatively larger than in most buzzards in Europe. Studies show even buteonine hawks slightly larger than goshawks on average take prey weighing less than 200 g (7.1 oz) whereas average goshawk prey is usually well over this weight. This is due largely to the much higher importance of microtine rodents to most buzzards, which, despite their occasional abundance, are ignored by goshawks in most regions. In many of the ecosystems that they inhabit, northern goshawks compete with resources with other predators, particularly where they take sizeable numbers of lagomorphs. About a dozen mammalian and avian predators all primarily consume European rabbits and hares alongside goshawks in the Iberian peninsula where these became primary staple foods. Like those co-habitant predators, the goshawk suffers declines during the low portion in the lagomorph's breeding cycles, which rise and fall cyclically every 10 to 12 years. However, even where these are primary food sources, the Eurasian goshawk is less specialised than many (even Eurasian eagle-owls, one of the most generalist avian predators, becomes an extremely specialised lagomorph hunter locally, to a greater extent than goshawks) and can alternate their food selection, often taking equal or greater numbers of squirrels and woodland birds. Due to this dietary variation, the Eurasian goshawk is less affected than other raptorial birds by prey population cycles and tends to not be depleted by resource competition.

On occasion, goshawks are robbed of their prey by a diversity of other birds, including harriers, other hawks, eagles, falcons and even gulls.

Eurasian goshawks have been shown, in some but not all areas, to outcompete and possibly lower the productivity of the common buzzard (Buteo buteo) when their ranges overlap. Usually, however, the dietary habits and nesting preferences are sufficiently distinct and thus affect neither buzzard nor goshawk populations. Both can mutually be very common even when the other is present.

To many other raptorial birds, the Eurasian goshawk is more significant as a predatory threat than as competition. The Eurasian goshawk is one of the most dangerous species to other raptors, especially to those considerably smaller than itself. In many cases, raptors of any age from nestlings to adults are taken around their nests but free-flying raptors too are readily taken or ambushed at a perch. One example is a study from northern England, common kestrels (Falco tinnunculus), which average about 184 g (6.5 oz), recorded as prey at goshawk nests (mainly in March and April) numbered 139, a larger number than kestrels recorded alive in the spring in the same area. In the Veluwe province of the Netherlands, the percentage of nest of European honey buzzards (Pernis apivorus), weighing on average 760 g (1.68 lb), predated by goshawks increased from a little as 7.7% in 1981–1990 to 33% in 2000–2004. As their habitat preferences may overlap with goshawks, all Accipiter and Tachyspiza species encountered may be predated in multiple cases, including the 238 g (8.4 oz) Eurasian sparrowhawk, the 188 g (6.6 oz) levant sparrowhawk (Tachyspiza brevipes), and the 122 g (4.3 oz) Japanese sparrowhawk (Tachyspiza gularis).

Other assorted accipitrids of up to their own size to be predated by goshawks include the 747 g (1.647 lb) black kite (Milvus migrans), the 1,080 g (2.38 lb) red kite (Milvus milvus), the 712 g (1.570 lb) western marsh harrier (Circus aeruginosus), 316 g (11.1 oz) Montagu's harrier (Circus pygargus), the 390 g (14 oz) pallid harrier (Circus macrourus), the 835 g (1.841 lb) booted eagle (Hieraaetus pennatus) and buzzards up to size of the 776 g (1.711 lb) common buzzard can be taken. Even raptors somewhat larger than a Eurasian goshawks have been considered as prey, although it is not clear whether adults are among the victims, including the 1,147 g (2.529 lb) crested honey-buzzard (Pernis ptilorhynchus) and the 1,370 g (3.02 lb) lesser spotted eagle (Clanga pomarina).

Outside of the accipitrid group, heavy predation on different varieties of raptorial birds by Eurasian goshawks can be significant. Many types of owl are taken and in Europe, the Eurasian goshawk is the second most prolific predator of owls behind the Eurasian eagle-owl (Bubo bubo). In Bavaria, Germany, the 287 g (10.1 oz) long-eared owl (Asio otus) was the second most common prey species for nesting goshawks. In the Białowieża Forest of Poland, fairly high numbers of the 475 g (1.047 lb) tawny owl (Strix aluco) were taken. Owls preyed upon by Eurasian goshawks range in size from the 58.5 g (0.129 lb) Eurasian pygmy owl (Glaucidium passerinum) to all the large northern Strix owls including adults. Whether adults have ever been killed as prey though is unknown. In addition, multiple species of falcon are preyed upon by goshawks. Adult falcons of small species such as kestrels and merlins (Falco columbarius) can be overpowered quite easily if they can manage to surprise the prey. Larger falcons have turned up in the diet as well, including the 966 g (2.130 lb) saker falcon (Falco cherrug), although the prey may have been nestlings. Brief aerial skirmishes between goshawks and peregrine falcons (Falco peregrinus) have been described but neither species is known to have killed one another in the wild. In Schleswig-Holstein, Germany, at least four small passerines species were recorded as nesting close to active goshawk nest, due to the incidental shelter that the fierce goshawks inadvertently provides from smaller raptors which are their main predators. Such raptors, including Eurasian kestrels, Eurasian sparrowhawks and long-eared owls, not only avoid goshawk activity where possible but also were found to have lower nest productivity any time they nested relatively close to goshawks per the study.

Competition for Eurasian goshawks can also come from mammalian carnivores. Martens, and to a lesser extent other weasels, are presumably one of their more major competitors as their diet often consists of similar prey primarily during spring and summer, tree squirrels and woodland birds, but little has been studied in terms of how the two types of predator affect each other. Most recorded interactions have been predatory, as the goshawk has been recorded preying on a dozen species, mainly mustelids. Carnivoran prey include weasels (Mustela nivalis), stoats (Mustela erminea), and larger predators such as European mink (Mustela lutreola), European polecat (Mustela putorius), feral American mink (Neogale vison), and martens (Martes spp.). Domestic carnivores are taken on scarce occasion, including dogs (Canis familiaris) and cats (Felis catus), predominately young specimens but the remain of an adult cat was found in a goshawk nest. Eurasian goshawks have also been recorded as feeding on much bigger predators such as the red fox (Vulpes vulpes) and raccoon dog (Nyctereutes procyonoides), but it is not clear whether these were actual kills, as many may be encountered as already dead carrion. The red fox is a clear competitor for resources with Eurasian goshawks. It was found in Norway that goshawk numbers were higher when voles were at peak numbers, not due to voles as a food source but because foxes were more likely to eat the rodents and ignore grouse, whereas during low vole numbers the foxes are more likely to compete with goshawks over grouse as prey. A decrease of the fox population of Norway due to sarcoptic mange was found result in an increase of grouse numbers and, in turn, Eurasian goshawks. In some areas, red foxes have been found to steal up to half of the goshawks' kills.

Unlike the predators at the top of the avian food chain such as eagles and the largest owls, which are rarely endangered by predation as adults, the Eurasian goshawk is itself susceptible to a fairly extensive range of predators. The most deadly are likely to be the Eurasian eagle-owl which not only predates goshawks of any age and at any season but also opportunistically take over their prior nests as their own nesting site. In Schleswig-Holstein, 59% of reintroduced eagle-owls used nests built by goshawks and no goshawk pairs could nest successfully within 500 m (1,600 ft) of an active eagle-owl nest. 18% of nest failures here positively were attributed to eagle-owl predation, with another 8% likely due to eagle-owls. Other larger raptorial birds can threaten them. Other avian predators known to have successfully preyed on goshawks including adults (usually in singular cases) include white-tailed eagle (Haliaeetus albicilla), Bonelli's eagle (Aquila fasciata), eastern imperial eagle (Aquila heliaca), snowy owl (Bubo scandiacus), and Ural owl (Strix uralensis).

The same mammalian predators that sometimes compete for food with Eurasian goshawks also sometimes kill them, with the nestlings, fledglings and brooding females, all with impaired flight due to their wing feather moults, seemingly the most vulnerable. In Europe, the pine marten (Martes martes) has been known to prey on young goshawks still in the nest but not adults. Other mammals capable of climbing trees have been observed or inferred to predate goshawks, either mostly or entirely young in the nests, including wolverines (Gulo gulo). Overall, the most recorded nest depredations are by eagle-owls, with martens and corvids usually only preying on goshawk nestlings when low food supplies cause the goshawks to have lower nest attendance (and presumably effect these predators to the extent that they take the risk of coming to the goshawk nest). Fledgling goshawks are also vulnerable to canids such as grey wolves (Canis lupus) and red foxes (Vulpes vulpes) as they may perch lower to the ground and are clumsier, more unsteady and less cautious than older birds. In one case, a goshawk that was ambushed and killed at a kill by a mangy vixen fox was able to lethally slash the windpipe of the fox, which apparently died moments after partially consuming the goshawk.

Apart from aforementioned predation events, Eurasian goshawks have at times been killed by non-predators, including prey that turned the tables on their pursuer, as well as in hunting accidents. In one case, a huge group (or murder) of hooded crows heavily mobbed a goshawk that they caught in a relatively open spot, resulting in a prolonged attack that ended up killing the goshawk. In another instance, a goshawk drowned while attempting to capture a tufted duck (Aythya fuligula). One young goshawk managed to escape a red fox that had caught it with a chewed wing, only to drown in a nearby creek. Another, and rather gruesome, hunting mishap occurred when a goshawk caught a large mountain hare and, while attempting to hold it in place by grasping vegetation with its other foot, was torn in half.

== Breeding ==
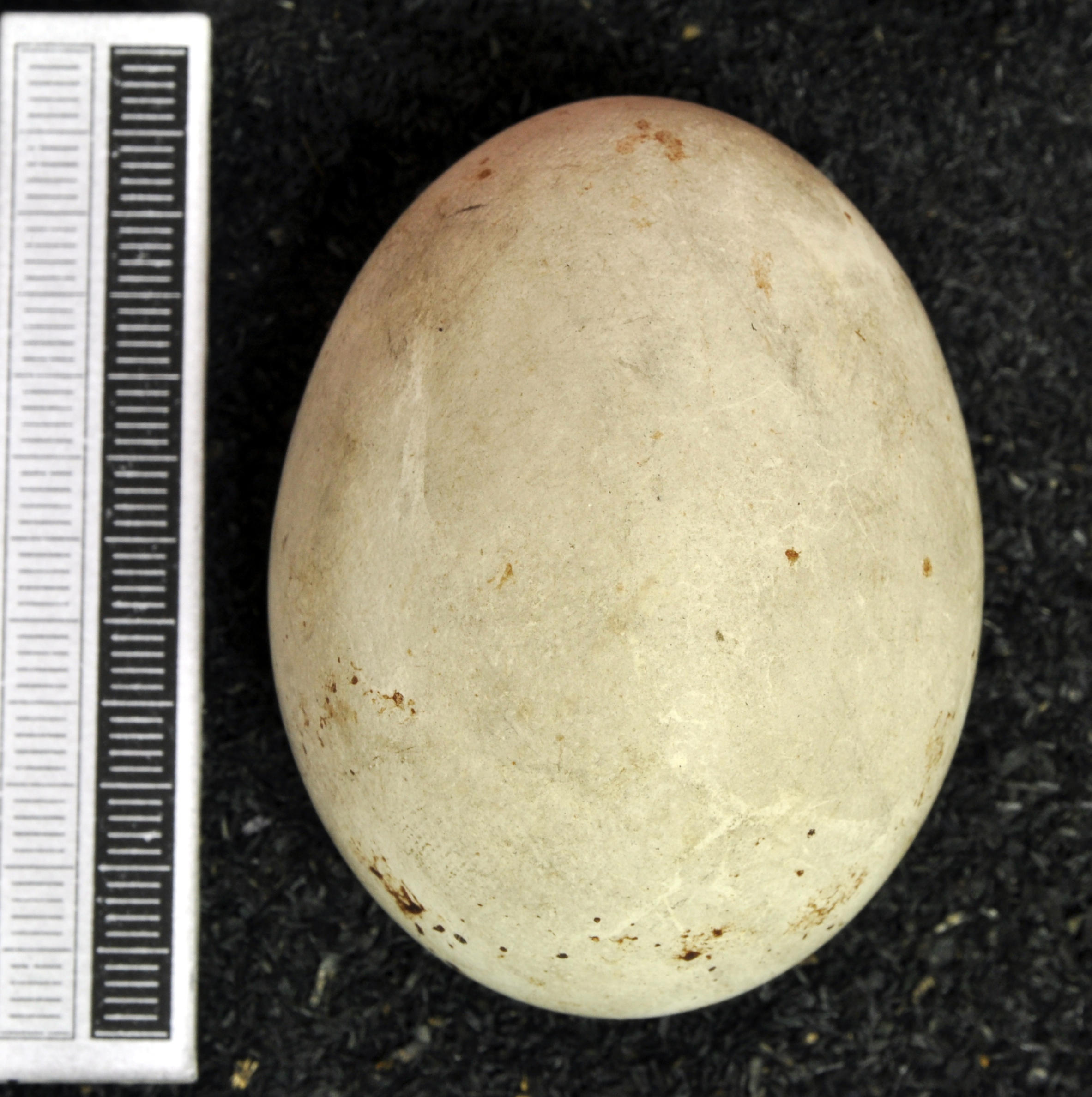
Egg Collection Museum Wiesbaden

Adult Eurasian goshawks typically form breeding pairs in February and will build or refurbish their nests during February and into March. Throughout Europe, egg-laying will usually commence during early April. Favourable weather during March has been associated with earlier egg-laying, and it is thought that climate change could advance the mean egg-laying date. Courtship flights, calls and even nest building has been recorded in Finland exceptionally early in September and October right after young dispersed, whereas in most of Fennoscandia, breeding does not commence any earlier than March and even then only when it is a warm spring. Courtship flights typical are above the canopy on sunny, relatively windless days in early spring with the goshawks' long main tail feathers held together and the undertail coverts spread so wide to give them an appearance of having a short, broad-tail with a long dark strip extending from the center. Display flights not infrequently escalate into an undulating flight, similar to a wood pigeon but with sharper turns and descents, and are sometimes embellished with sky-dives that can cover over 200 m (660 ft). One study found undulating display flights more than three times more often done by males than females. After display flights have concluded, the male typically brings a prepared fresh prey item to the female as part of the courtship. In general, these displays are presumably to show (or reinforce) to the potential mate their health and prowess as a breeding partner. Copulation is brief and frequent, ranging up to nearly 520 times per clutch (on average about 10 times a day or 100-300 throughout the season), and may be the male's way of ensuring paternity since he is frequently away gathering food by the time of egg-laying, although extra-pair copulation is extremely rare. The female solicits copulations by facing away from the male with drooped wings and flared tail-coverts. The male, wings drooped and tail-coverts flared, drops from a branch to gain momentum, then swoops upward and mounts her back. Both birds usually call while mating. Fidelity studies from Europe show that about 80–90% of adult females breed with the same male in consecutive years, whereas up to 96% of males mate with the same female in consecutive years. Males intruding in Hamburg, Germany territories were in some cases not evicted and ended up mating with the female, with the male of the pair not stopping it. In migratory, northernmost populations, mate retention in consecutive years is low. Males are sometimes killed by females during courtship and encounters can be dangerous especially if he does not bring food to courtship and he often seems nervous withdrawing with a trill at a given chance.

=== Nest characteristics ===
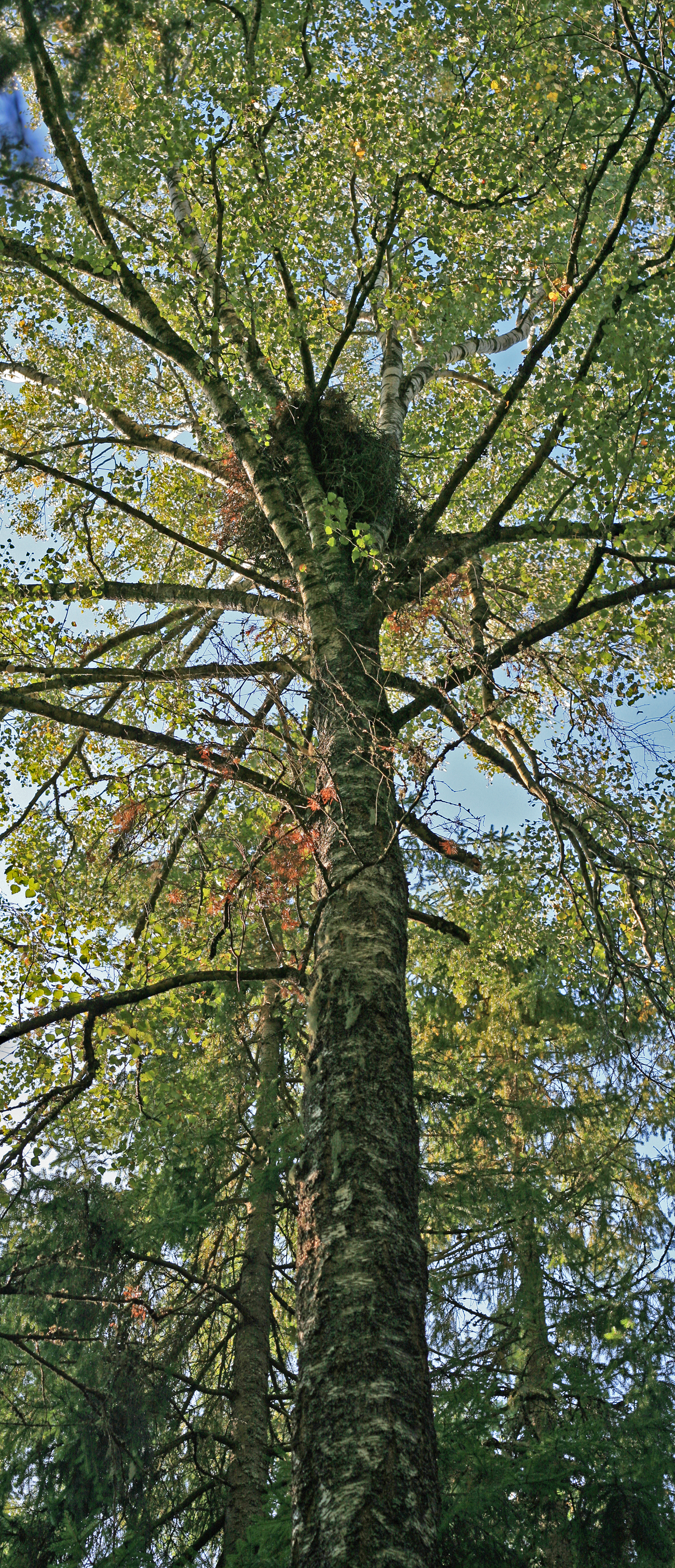
Nests are usually large structures placed quite high near the canopy on mature, tall trees, as seen on this birch in Norway

Nesting areas are indefinite, a nest may be used for several years, also a nest built years prior may be used or an entirely new nest may be constructed. When nest constructing, the pair will often roost together. Males construct most new nests but females may assist somewhat if reinforcing old nests. While the male is building, the female perches in the vicinity, occasionally screaming, sometimes flying to inspect the nest. At other times, the female may take a more active role, or even the primary one, in new nest construction and this is subject to considerable individual variation. For the nesting tree, more than 20 species of conifer have been used including spruce, fir, larch, pine and hemlock. Broadleaf trees used including ash, alder, aspen, beech, birch, elm, hornbeam, lime, maple (including sycamore), oak, poplar, wild cherry and willow. In some areas, the nests may be lined with hard pieces of bark and also with green sprigs of conifers. Often the tallest tree in a given stand is selected as the nest tree and this is often the dominant tree species within the given region and forest. Most nests are constructed under the canopy or near the main fork of a tree and average height is between 9 and 25 m (30 and 82 ft). In the dwarf trees of the tundra, nests have been found at only 1 to 2 m (3.3 to 6.6 ft) off the ground, and, in the tundra and elsewhere, very rarely on felled trees, stumps or on the ground. More significant than species is the maturity and height of the nesting tree, its structure (which should have ample surface around the main fork) and, perhaps most significantly, little to no understory below it. Multiple studies note the habit of nests being built in forests close to clear-fellings, swamps and heaths, lakes and meadows, roads (especially light-use logging dirt roads), railways and swathes cut along power cables, usually near such openings there'd be prominent boulders, stones or roots of fallen trees or low branches to use as plucking points. Canopy cover averaged between 60 and 96% in Europe. As is typical in widely distributed raptors from temperate-zones, those from cold regions nest facing south, 54% in Norway, otherwise usually nests face north and east.

Nests, especially after initial construction, may average between 80 and 120 cm (31 and 47 in) in length and 50 to 70 cm (20 to 28 in) in width, and are around 20 to 25 cm (7.9 to 9.8 in) deep. After many uses, a nest can range up to 160 cm (63 in) across and 120 cm (47 in) in depth and can weigh up to a ton when wet. Eurasian goshawks may adopt nests of other species, common buzzards contributed 5% of nests used in Schleswig-Holstein, including unusually exposed ones on edges of woods and another 2% were built by common ravens or carrion crows, but 93% were built by the goshawks themselves. While colonising peri-urban areas in Europe, they may displace Eurasian sparrowhawks not only from their territories but may actually try to use overly small sparrowhawk nests, usually resulting in nest collapse. One nest was used continuously by different pairs for a period of 17 years. A single pair may maintain up to several nests, usually up to two will occur in an area of no more than a few hundred meters. One nest may be used in sequential years, but often an alternate is selected. During an 18-year-study from Germany, many alternate nests were used, 27 pairs had two, 10 had 3, 5 had 4, one had five and one pair had as many as 11. In Poland, pairs had on average two nests. The extent of use of alternate nests is unknown as well as their benefit, but they may reduce significant levels of parasites and diseases within the nest. In central Europe, the goshawk's nest area can be as small 1 to 2 ha (2.5 to 4.9 acres) of woods and less than 10 hectares are commonplace. Nests are not typically found near forest edges, and usually only one active nest occurs per 100 ha (250 acres), with active nests from different breeding pairs being seldom less than 600 m (2,000 ft) apart. The most closely spaced active nests by a separate pair on record was 400 m (1,300 ft) in central Europe, another case of two active nests 200 m (660 ft) apart in Germany was a possible case of polygamy.

=== Eggs ===
The eggs are laid at 2- to 3-day intervals on average between April and June (usually May), taking up to 9 days for a clutch of 3–4 and 11 days for a clutch of 5. The eggs are rough, unmarked pale bluish or dirty white. In Spanish eggs, the average dimensions were 56.3 mm × 43 mm (2.22 in × 1.69 in) compared to German ones, which averaged 57.3 mm × 44 mm (2.26 in × 1.73 in). Goshawks from Lapland, Finland lay the largest known eggs at 62–65 mm (2.4–2.6 in) x 47–49.5 mm (1.85–1.95 in), while other Finnish goshawk eggs ranged from 59–64 mm (2.3–2.5 in) x 45–48 mm (1.8–1.9 in). Weight of the eggs average 63 g (2.2 oz) in Great Britain and 50 to 60 g (1.8 to 2.1 oz) in Poland and Germany, with extreme weights from the latter nations of 35 to 75 g (1.2 to 2.6 oz). Clutch size almost always averages between 2 and 4 eggs, with a median around 3, rarely as few as 1 or as many 5–6 will be laid. In combination spring weather and prey population levels seem to drive both egg laying dates and clutch size. If an entire clutch is lost, a replacement can be laid within 15 to 30 days.

=== Parental behaviour ===
During incubation, females tend to become quieter and more inconspicuous. The mother can develop a brooding patch of up to 15 by 5 cm (5.9 by 2.0 in) on her underside. She may turn the eggs as frequently as every 30 to 60 minutes. Males may incubate as many as 1 to 3 hours, but usually less than an hour, early in incubation but rarely do so later on. During daylight females can do as much as 96% of the observed incubation. The incubation stage last for any time between 28 and 37 days (rarely up to 41 days in exceptionally big clutches), varying in different parts of the range. After hatching occurs, the male does not come directly to the nest but instead just delivers food (usually already plucked, beheaded or otherwise dismembered) to a branch near the nest which the female tears apart and shares between herself and the nestlings. Food deliveries by the male can be daily or as infrequent as every 3 to 5 days. In turn, the female must feed the young about twice a day in order for the chicks to avoid starvation. Caching of food has been recorded near the nest, but only before the young start feeding themselves. Food deliveries must average about 250 to 320 g (8.8 to 11.3 oz) per young goshawk per day for them to successfully fledge, or 700 to 950 g (1.54 to 2.09 lb) total daily and 60 to 100 kg (130 to 220 lb) throughout the season for an average sized clutch of around three. Females will also start capturing prey later on, but usually only after the young have already fledged. In Europe, female goshawks may press down on their nest if a human approaches, others may unobtrusively leave the nest, although are more reluctant to leave the nest late in incubation. Occasionally, both males and females have been recorded abandoning the nest and their mates. There are a few rare cases where males successfully reared up to 4 young after the female abandoned the nest or was killed between the second and third week. Otherwise, the male will continue delivering prey but without the female all the nestlings will starve to death and the food simply rots. In cases where the male abandons the female and the brood, she may be able to successfully brood but usually only one nestling is likely to survive to fledge without the male's contribution of prey. At other times the mother may be replaced, sometimes forcefully, by another female, usually an older mature one. Exceptional cases of polygamy, with a male mating with two females, have been reported in Germany and The Netherlands and typically these breeding attempts fail.

=== Hatching and development ===
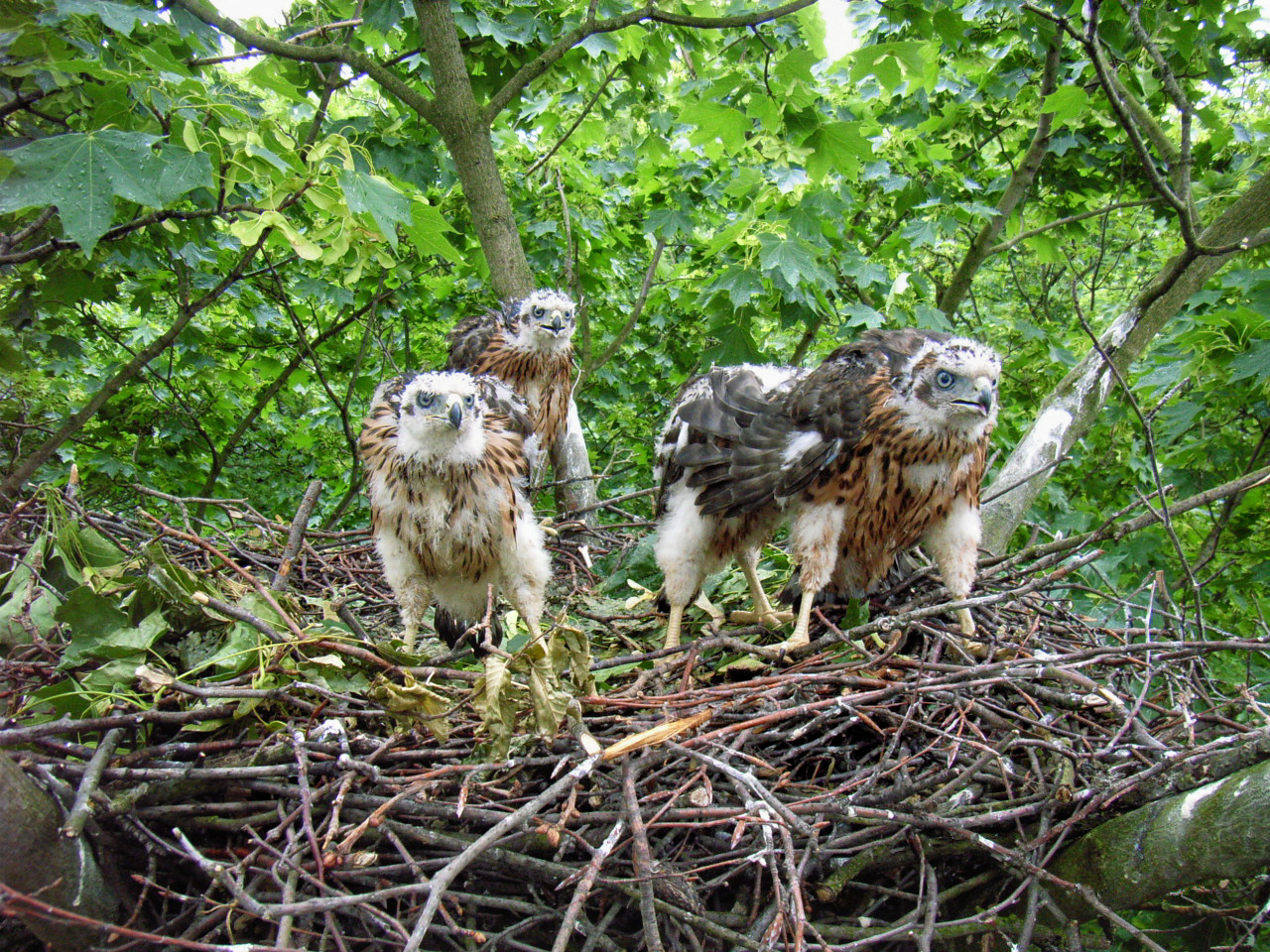
Nestling Eurasian goshawks in Germany

Hatching is asynchronous but not completely, usually an average sized clutch takes only 2 to 3 days to hatch, although it may take up to 6 days to hatch a clutch of more than 4 eggs. Hatchlings start calling from within the shell as much as 38 hours before hatching, as a faint chep, chep, chack, peep, peep, peep may be heard. The young are covered with down and altricial (as are all raptors) at first but develop rapidly. Hatchlings measure about 13 cm (5.1 in) long at first and grow about 5 to 9 cm (2.0 to 3.5 in) in length each week until they fledge. The mothers typically brood the nestlings intensively for about two weeks, around the time greyer feathers start to develop through the nestlings' down. The most key time for development may be at three weeks when the nestlings can stand a bit and start to develop their flight feathers. Also at the three-week stage, they can reach about half the adults' weight and females start to noticeably outgrow the males. However, this growth requires increased food delivery so frequently results in lower nest attendance and, in turn, higher predation rates. Also rates of starvation at this stage can exceed 50% especially in the youngest of large clutches of 4 to 5. Nestlings at four weeks are starting to develop strong flight feathers, which they frequently flap; also they can start to pull on food but are still mainly fed by female and begin to make a whistling scream when she goes to fetch food from the male. More active feeding behaviour by nestlings may increase their aggression towards each other. By the 5th week, they have developed many typical goshawk behaviours, sometimes mantling over food, testing balance by extending one leg and one wing at edge of nest (called "warbling" by falconers) and can wag their tails vigorously. Starvation risk also increases at this point due to their growing demands and, due to their incessant begging calls, vocal activity may court predators. In 6th week, they become "branchers", although still spend much of the time by the nest, especially by the edge. The young goshawks "play" by seizing and striking violent at a perch or by yanking off leaves and tossing them over their back. Wing feathers do not develop highly dimorphically, but male branchers are better developed than females who have more growing to do and can leave the nest up to 1–3 days sooner. The young rarely return to the nest after being 35 to 46 days of age and start their first flight another 10 days later, thus becoming full fledglings. Goshawk nestlings frequently engage in "runting", wherein the older siblings push aside and call more loudly and are thus are feed more often at food deliveries, until the younger siblings may either starve to death, be trampled or killed by their siblings (referred to as siblicide or "cainism"). There is some evidence that mother goshawks may lessen the effects of runting by delaying incubation until their last eggs are laid. Food supply may be linked to higher rates of siblicides and, in many locations with consistent prey levels, runting and siblicide can occur somewhat seldom (meaning the northern goshawk is a "facultative" rather than "obligate cainist"). Nonetheless, either by predation, starvation or siblicide, few nests produce more than 2 to 3 fledglings. One pair in North America was able to successfully fledge all four of its young. Somewhat larger numbers of female fledglings are produced in Europe with their larger size, but the opposite is true in the American goshawk where sexual dimorphism is less pronounced. When food supplies are very high, though, European goshawks actually can produce somewhat more males than females.

At about 50 days old, the young goshawks may start hunting on their own but more often eat carrion either provided by parents or biologists. Most fledglings stay within 300 m (980 ft) of the nest at 65 days of age but can wander up to 1,000 km (620 mi) before dispersal at between 65 and 80 days old in sync with the full development of their flight feathers. Between 65 and 90 days after hatching, more or less all young goshawks become independent. There is no evidence that parents aggressively displace the young in the fall (as other raptorial birds have sometimes been reported to do), therefore the young birds seek independence on their own. Goshawk siblings are not cohesive together past 65 days, except for some lingering young females, whereas common buzzard broods are not recorded at their nests after 65 days but remain strongly cohesive with each other. Five percent of radio-tagged young in Gotland, Sweden (entirely males) were found to disperse to another breeding area and join a different brood as soon as their flight feathers were developed enough. These seem to be cases of moving to a better food area. Parents and adoptive young seem to tolerate this, although parents do not seem to be able to tell the difference between their own and other young. It is only after dispersal that goshawks typically start to hunt and seem to drink more often than older birds, sometimes spend up to an hour bathing.

=== Breeding success rates ===
Nest success averages between 80 and 95% in terms of the number of nests that produce fledglings, with an average number of 2 to 3 fledglings per nest. About equal numbers of eggs and nestlings may be lost but according to a study from Spain large clutches of 4 to 5 had higher losses overall than medium-sized clutches of 2 to nearly 4. Total losses averaged 36% in Spain across clutches of 2–5. Similar results were found in Germany, with similar numbers of fledglings produced in very large clutches (more than 4) as in medium-sized ones (2–4). A grading of success from a study in Sweden found categories of competent and less competent pairs, with losses averaging 7% and 17% in these two groups, respectively. Studies from Finland found that average number of fledglings varied dramatically based on food supply based on the cyclical nature of most prey in these northern areas, varying from average success rates of 0 to 3.9 fledglings in the latter region.

=== Nesting failure ===
Poor weather, which consists of cold springs that bear late cold spells, snow, and freezing rain, causes many nests to fail, and may also hamper courtship and lower brood size and overall breeding attempts. However, the most important cause of nest failure was found to be nest destruction by humans and other predators, starvation, then bad weather and collapse of nests in declining order. On average, humans are responsible based on known studies for about 17% of nest failures in Europe. 32% of 97 nestlings in Bavaria, Germany died because of human activities, while 59% of 111 broods in England failed due to this factor. Low food supplies are linked to predation, as it seems to cause greater risk of predation due to the lower nest attendance. Lower densities of pairs may actually increase nesting success, as per studies from Finland where the highest median clutch size, at 3.8, was in the area with the lowest densities. Similarly, in Schleswig-Holstein, nest failure was 14% higher where active nests were closer than 2 km (1.2 mi) apart compared to nests farther than this. Age may also play a factor in nest success, pairings where one mate is not fully mature (usually the female, as males rarely breed before attaining adult plumage) is less than half as successful as ones where both were mature. Overall, males do not normally breed at any younger than 3 years of age (although they are in adult plumage by two years) and females can breed at as young as 1 to 2 years old, but rarely produce successful, viable clutches. The age at sexual maturity is the same as other northern Accipiters as well as most buteonine hawks (eagles, on the other hand, can take twice as long to attain full sexual maturity). 6–9 years of age seem to be the overall peak reproductive years for most Eurasian goshawks. However, some females can reproduce at as old as 17 years old and senescence is ambiguous in both sexes (possibly not occurring in males). Median values of brood success was found to be 77% in Europe overall. In Europe, clutch size overall averages 3.3, the number of nestlings averages 2.5 and fledglings averages 1.9.

== Lifespan and mortality ==
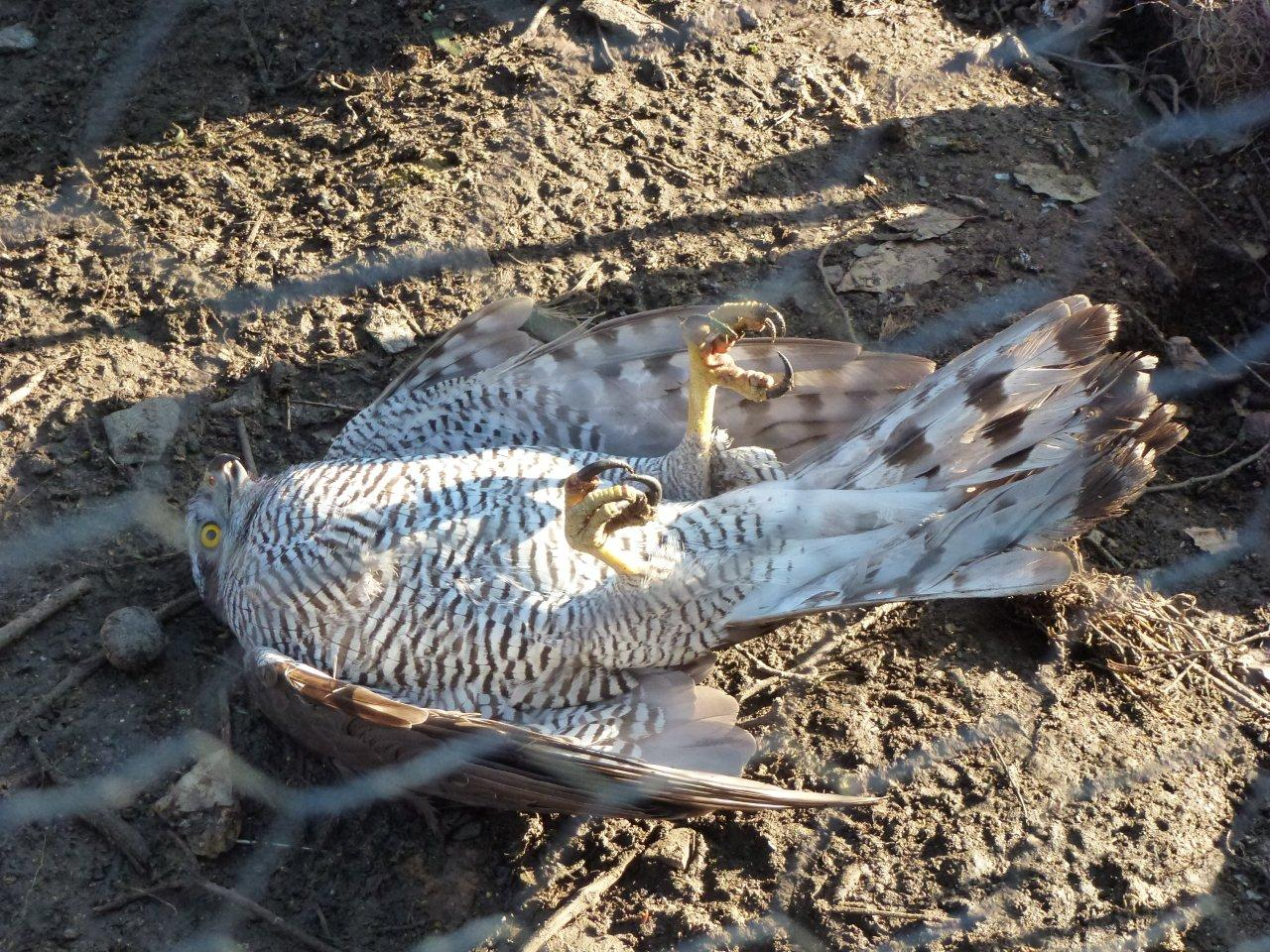
Goshawks may be killed by collisions with man-made objects

The oldest known captive Eurasian goshawk lived to be at least 19 years old. The lifespan in the wild is variable. A 30-year study in Germany (1975–2004) found no females surviving beyond 10 years old. Their mortality rates fluctuated from 8% to 38% between the ages of 1 and 8 years old before rising to 55% at age 9. In Fennoscandia, starvation was found to account for 3-6% of reported deaths. In Norway, 9% of deaths were from starvation, but the percentage of demises from this increased to the north and affected juveniles more so than adults. In Gotland, Sweden, 28% of mortality was from starvation and disease. Mortality rates for first-year goshawks is often considerably higher than older birds. In studies from Gotland, Sweden, Schleswig-Holstein, Germany and the Netherlands, 40–42% of first-years died. By the second year, mortality rates drop to 31–35%, based on ring studies from the Netherlands and Finland. Feather results indicate that annual mortality for adult Eurasian goshawks in Europe is up to 7% higher than that of American goshawks.

In many parts of the range, especially Europe, historic populations decreased regionally due to human persecution (especially shooting), disturbance and epidemic loss of habitat, especially during the 19th century and early 20th. From 1880 to 1930, an estimated 3,000–5,500 goshawk were being killed annually in Norway when bounties were offered. Shooting rate lowered later, causing the average number of goshawks shot to drop to 654 to for the period 1965–1970. Eurasian goshawks continue to be persecuted in Norway, shown by the high turnover rate of breeding females in Telemark County, revealed by DNA analysis of moulted feathers. In Finland, where the species was not legally protected, 4,000–8,000 goshawks were being killed annually from 1964 to 1975. Most goshawks shot are incautious juveniles, with 58% of juvenile mortality in Germany and 59% from the Netherlands being killings by humans. Increase of pheasant releases in Vendsyssel, Denmark from 6,000 to 35,000 since 1994 has resulted in fewer goshawks as they often hunt the pheasants in winter and are shot, legally, by the region's gamekeepers. As recently as about five years before that, intentional killing by humans continued as the main cause of mortality for goshawks on Gotland, Sweden, causing 36% of deaths. Prior to it being granted protective legislation, the goshawk had exceptionally high mortality rates in Europe. A study in Sweden found the first-year mortality rate to be about 80%, then 50% for the second year, and thereafter a yearly mortality rate of about 40%. In Finland, only 2.3% of goshawks lived beyond the age of 5. The mortality rates in Finland were 74% in the first year, 64% in the second year, 56% in year three and 35% in year four.

== Status ==
The European population of the Eurasian goshawk is estimated at 234,000–380,000 mature individuals, with a rough estimate for the total world population being 900,000–1,460,000 mature individuals. This makes it the fourth most numerous raptor in Europe, after the common buzzard (>700,000 pairs), Eurasian sparrowhawk (>340,000 pairs) and common kestrel (>330,000 pairs). The most populated countries by goshawks in Europe were Sweden (an estimated 10,000 pairs), Germany (8,500 pairs), Finland (6,000 pairs) and France (5,600 pairs). The highest densities of breeding pairs per 100 km^{2} (39 sq mi) of land were in The Netherlands, Latvia and Switzerland, although this is biased due to the small land area of these countries. Densities in western and central Europe were recorded at 0.5–6.2 pairs per 100 km^{2} (39 sq mi). In boreal Sweden, numbers vary from 1 to 4.5 pairs per 100 km^{2} (39 sq mi). Russia has a roughly estimated 85,000 pairs of Eurasian goshawk. The hotspots of density for goshawks in Europe lie in east-central Europe (around Poland) and in west-central area (the Netherlands/West Germany). In the United Kingdom and Ireland, the Eurasian goshawk was extirpated in the 19th century because of specimen collectors and persecution by gamekeepers, but in recent years it has successfully recolonised the British Isles through migration from Europe, escaped falconry birds, and deliberate releases. The goshawk is now found in considerable numbers in Kielder Forest, Northumberland, which is the largest forest in Britain. Overall there are some 620 pairs in Britain.

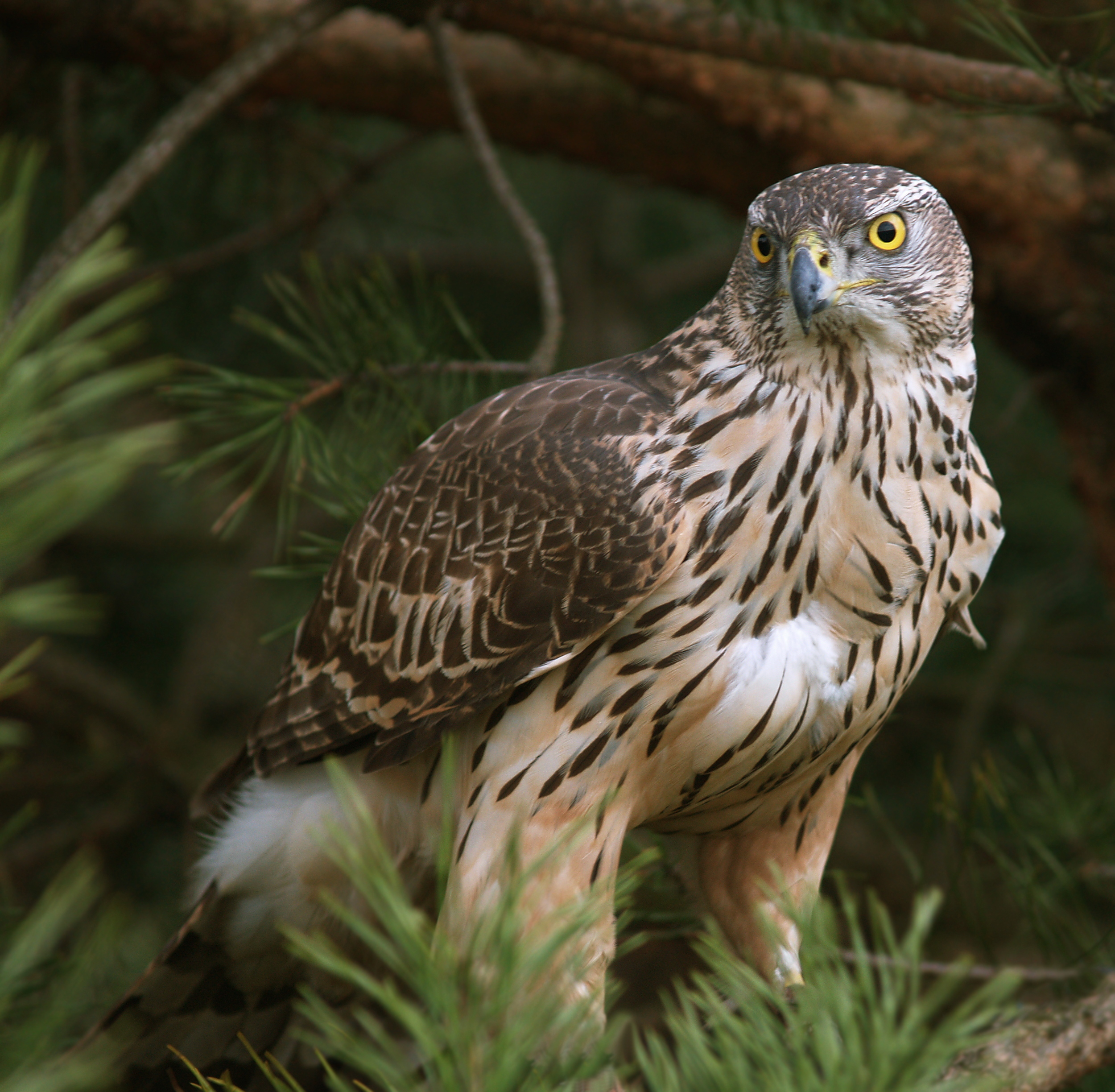
Juvenile goshawk from Poland

In the 1950s–1960s declines were increasingly linked with pesticide pollution. Higher DDT levels seemed to have persisted quite recently in Europe. This was the case in Germany, especially in former East Germany where DDT was widely available until 1988, having been largely discontinued elsewhere after the 1970s. Goshawks, which had increased in The Netherlands after World War II due to less persecution, new woodlands and increased pigeon numbers, were found to have suddenly crashed from the late 1950s on. It was later revealed that this was due to DDT, the number of breeding pairs decreasing 84% from 1958 to 1963. As opposed to DDT, the main contaminant found to have reduced goshawks in Scandinavia during the 20th century were methyl mercury seed dressings used to reduce fungal attack in livestock.

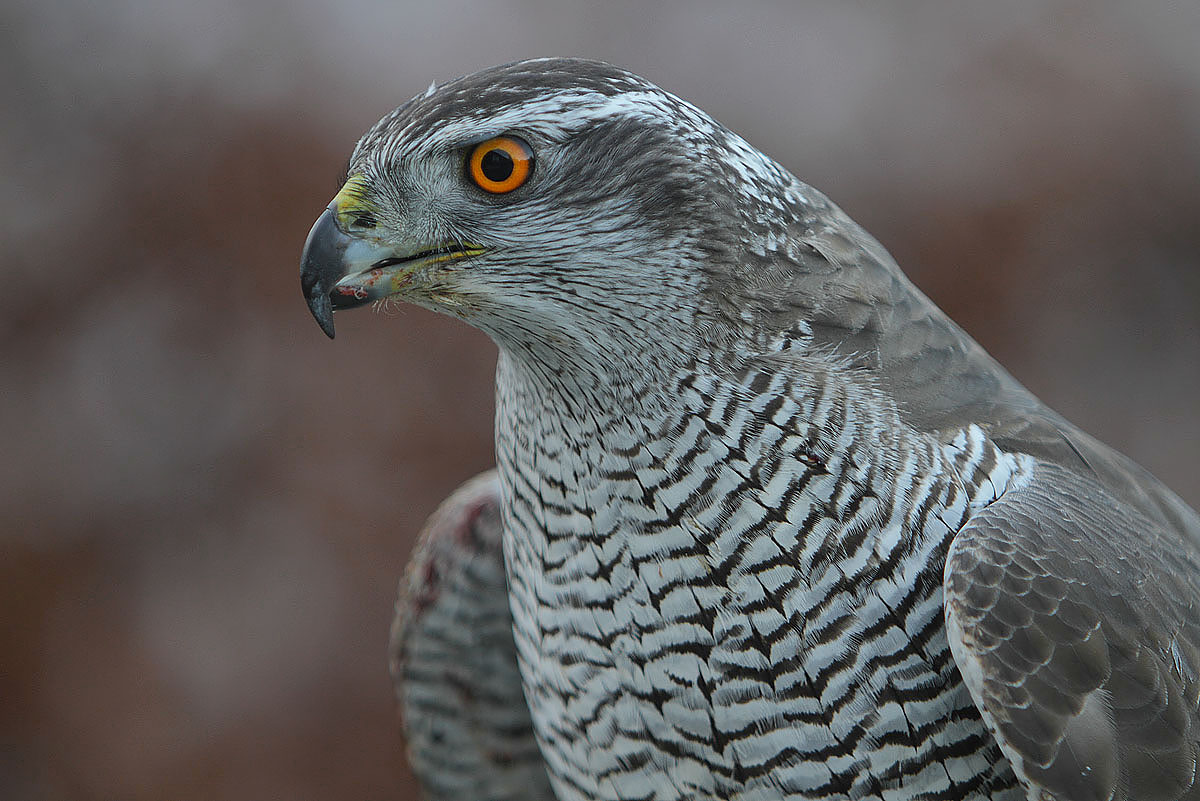
Falconer's bird in Scotland

Seemingly the remaining persistent conservation threat to goshawks, given their seeming overall resilience (at the species level) to both persecution and pesticides, is deforestation. Timber harvests are known to destroy many nests and adversely regional populations. Harvest methods that create extensive areas of reduced forest canopy cover, dropping to cover less than 35-40%, may be especially detrimental as cases of this usually cause all goshawks to disappear from the area. However, the mortality rates due to foresting practices are unknown and it is possible that some mature goshawks may simply be able to shift to other regions when a habitat becomes unsuitable but this is presumably unsustainable in the long-term. A study from Italy and France shows that goshawks only left woodlots when the canopy was reduced by more than 30%, although the European goshawk populations have long been known to be adaptable to some degree of habitat fragmentation.

== Relationship with humans ==
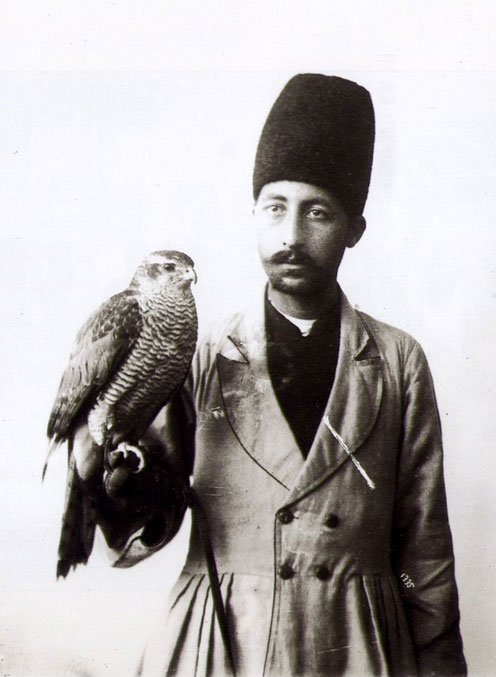
Iranian falconer with a trained goshawk

=== Human culture ===
The Eurasian goshawk appears on the flag and coat of arms of the Azores. The archipelago of the Azores, Portugal, takes its name from the Portuguese language word for goshawk, (açor), because the explorers who discovered the archipelago thought the birds of prey they saw there were goshawks, but it was later found that the birds were kites or common buzzards (Buteo buteo rothschildi). The goshawk features in Stirling Council's coat of arms via the crest of the Drummond Clan.

Hawks are highly associated with Guru Gobind Singh in the Sikh community. According to ornithologists, he is believed to have kept a white Eurasian goshawk. This is reflected in that the Eurasian goshawk was made the official state bird of Punjab, India.

=== In falconry ===
The name "goshawk" is a traditional name from Anglo-Saxon gōshafoc, literally "goose hawk". The name implies prowess against larger quarry such as wild geese, but were also flown against crane species and other large waterbirds. The name "goose hawk" is somewhat of a misnomer, however, as the traditional quarry for goshawks in ancient and contemporary falconry has been rabbits, pheasants, partridge, and medium-sized waterfowl, which are similar to much of the prey the species hunts in the wild. A notable exception is in records of traditional Japanese falconry, where goshawks were used more regularly on goose and crane species. In ancient European falconry literature, goshawks were often referred to as a yeoman's bird or the "cook's bird" because of their utility as a hunting partner catching edible prey, as opposed to the peregrine falcon, also a prized falconry bird, but more associated with noblemen and less adapted to a variety of hunting techniques and prey types found in wooded areas. The goshawk has remained equal to the peregrine falcon in its stature and popularity in modern falconry.

Goshawk hunting flights in falconry typically begin from the falconer's gloved hand, where the fleeing bird or rabbit is pursued in a horizontal chase. The goshawk's flight in pursuit of prey is characterised by an intense burst of speed often followed by a binding manoeuvre, where the goshawk, if the prey is a bird, inverts and seizes the prey from below. The goshawk, like other accipiters, shows a marked willingness to follow prey into thick vegetation, even pursuing prey on foot through brush. Goshawks trained for falconry not infrequently escape their handlers and, extrapolated from the present day British population which is composed mostly of escaped birds as such, have reasonably high survival rates, although many do die shortly after escape and many do not successfully breed. The effect of modern-day collection of goshawks for falconry purposes is unclear, unlike some falcon species which can show regional declines due to heavy falconry collections but can increase in other areas due to established escapees from falconers.
