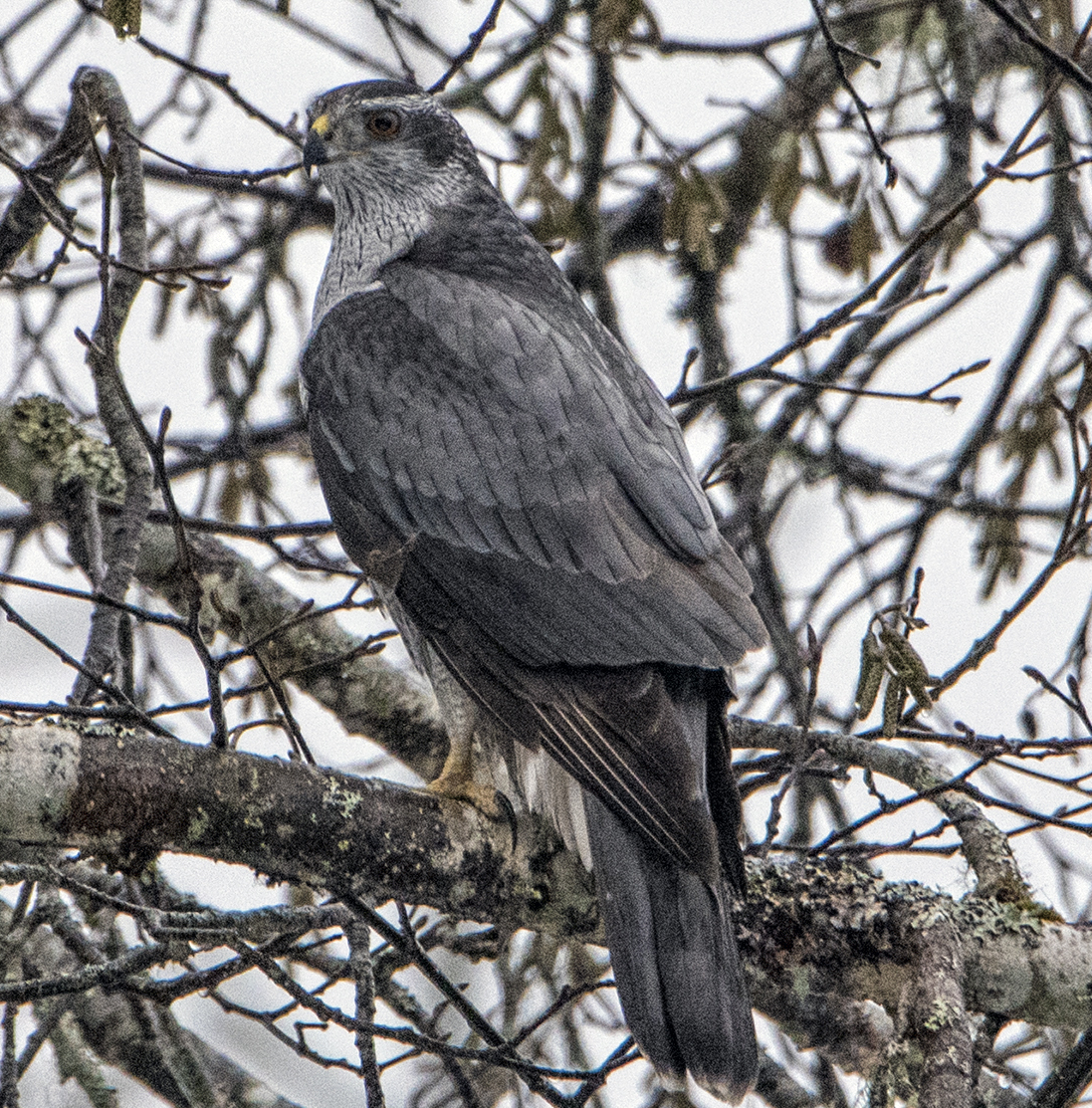
- Adult in Juneau, Alaska

Conservation status
- Least Concern (IUCN 3.1)

Scientific classification
- Kingdom: Animalia
- Phylum: Chordata
- Class: Aves
- Order: Accipitriformes
- Family: Accipitridae
- Genus: Astur
- Species: A. atricapillus

Binomial name
- Astur atricapillus (Wilson, A, 1812)

Subspecies
- Astur atricapillus apache; Astur atricapillus atricapillus; Astur atricapillus laingi
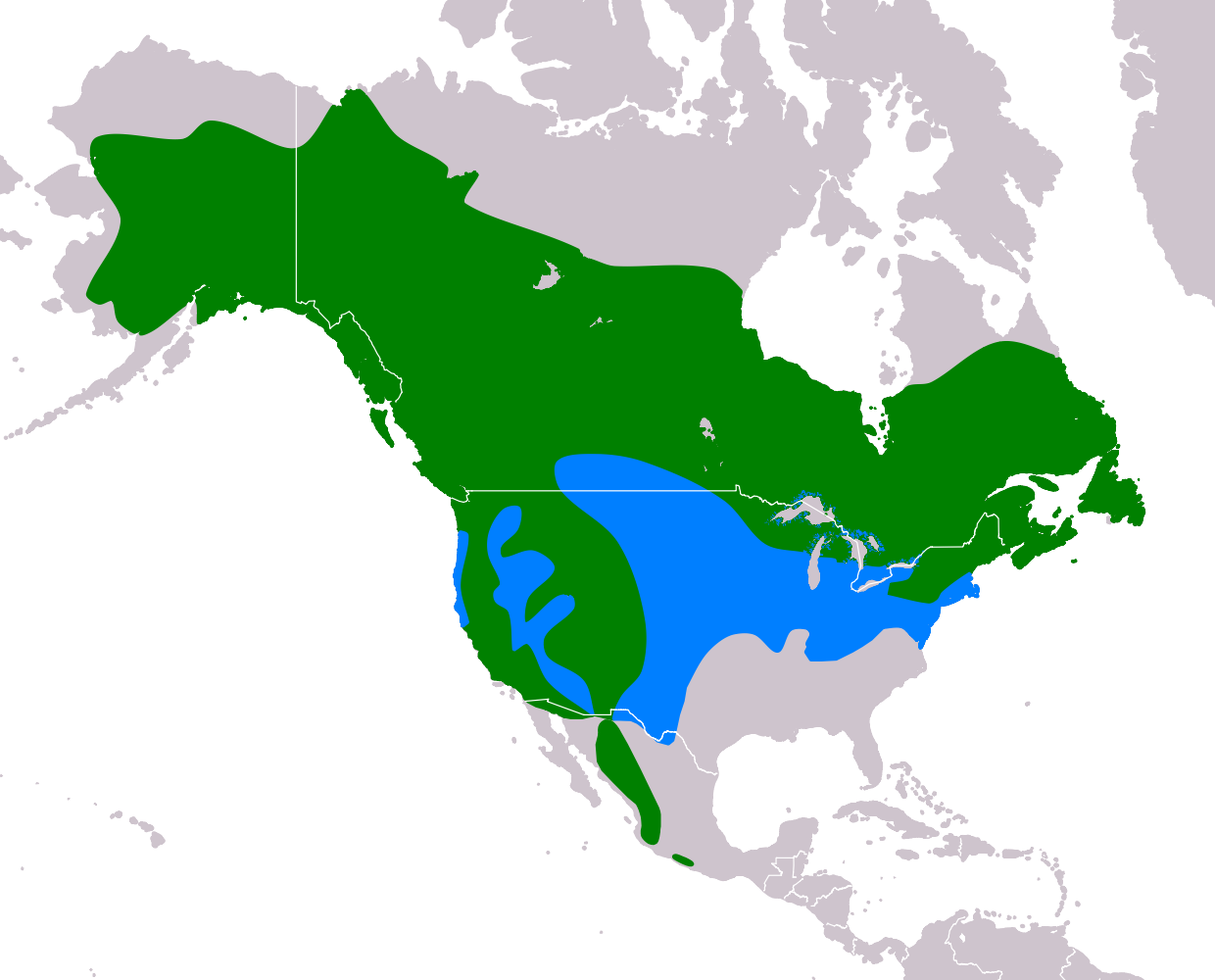
- Range of A. atricapillus Resident Non-breeding

= American goshawk =

Species of bird

The American goshawk (Astur atricapillus) is a species of raptor in the family Accipitridae. It was first described by Alexander Wilson in 1812. The American goshawk was previously considered conspecific with the Eurasian goshawk but was assigned to a separate species in 2023 based on differences in morphology, vocalizations, and genetic divergence. It was formerly placed in the genus Accipiter. It is mainly resident, but birds from colder regions migrate south for the winter. In North America, migratory goshawks are often seen migrating south along mountain ridge tops at nearly any time of the fall depending on latitude.

== Distribution ==
In North America, they are most broadly found in the Western United States, including Alaska, and western Canada. Their breeding range in the western contiguous United States largely consists of the wooded foothills of the Rocky Mountains and many other large mountain ranges from Washington to southern California extending east to central Colorado and westernmost Texas. Somewhat discontinuous breeding populations are found in southeastern Arizona and southwestern New Mexico, thence also somewhat spottily into western Mexico down through Sonora and Chihuahua along the Sierra Madre Occidental as far as Jalisco and Guerrero, their worldwide southern limit as a breeding species.

The goshawk continues east through much of Canada as a native species, but is rarer in most of the Eastern United States, especially the Midwest, where they are not typically found outside the Great Lakes region, where a good-sized breeding population occurs in the northern parts of Minnesota, Illinois, Michigan, and somewhat into Ohio; a very small population persists in the extreme northeast corner of North Dakota. They breed also in mountainous areas of New England, New York, central Pennsylvania, and northwestern New Jersey, sporadically down to extreme northwestern Maryland and northeastern West Virginia. Vagrants have been reported in most of the parts of the United States in which they do not breed.

== Habitat ==
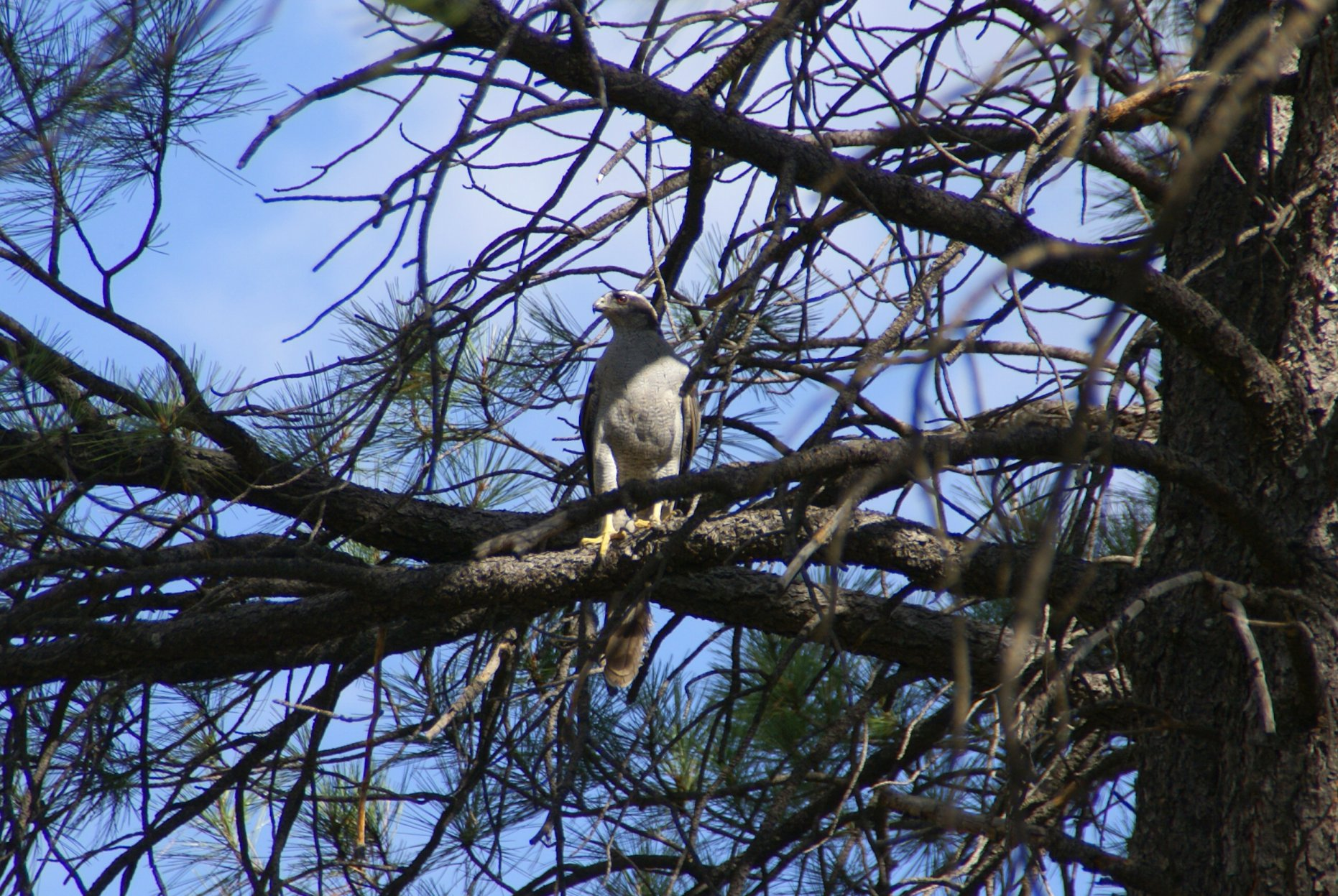
Adult in the Kaibab Plateau, Arizona, in a pine tree that typifies the habitat used locally

American and Eurasian goshawks can be found in both deciduous and coniferous forests. While the species might show strong regional preferences for certain trees, they seem to have no strong overall preferences nor even a preference between deciduous or coniferous trees despite claims to the contrary. More important than the type of trees are the composition of a given tree stand, which should be tall, old-growth with intermediate to heavy canopy coverage (often more than 40%) and minimal density undergrowth, both of which are favorable for hunting conditions. Also, goshawks typically require proximity to openings in which to execute additional hunting.

Access to waterways and riparian zones of any kind is not uncommon in goshawk home ranges but seems to not be a requirement. Narrow tree-lined riparian zones in otherwise relatively open habitats can provide suitable wintering habitat in the absence of more extensive woodlands. The American goshawk can be found at almost any altitude, but recently is typically found at high elevations due to a paucity of extensive forests remaining in lowlands across much of its range. Altitudinally, goshawks may live anywhere up to a given mountain range's tree line, which is usually 3,000 m (9,800 ft) in elevation or less. In winter months, the northernmost or high mountain populations move down to warmer forests with lower elevations, often continuing to avoid detection except while migrating. A majority of goshawks around the world remain sedentary throughout the year.

== Description ==
=== Similar species ===
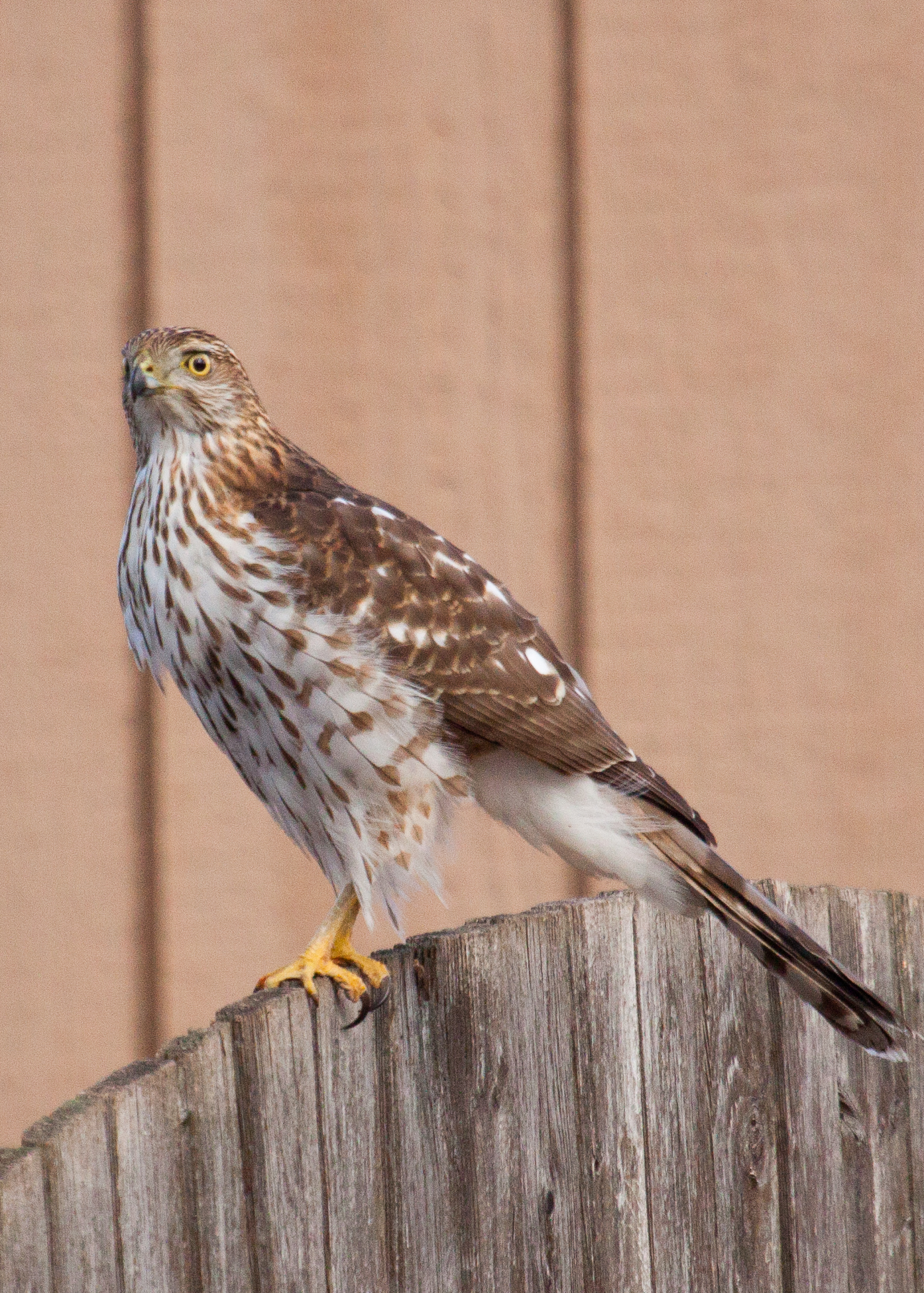
Large juvenile Cooper's hawks such as this one are at times mistaken for a juvenile goshawk

The juvenile plumage of the species may cause some confusion, especially with other juvenile Astur species. Unlike other northern Astur, the adult American and Eurasian goshawk never has a rusty color to its underside barring. Wing beats of American goshawks are deeper, more deliberate, and on average slower than those of the two other North American Asturs.

American goshawks are sometimes mistaken for species even outside of the genus Astur especially as juveniles of each respective species. In North America, four species of buteonine hawk (all four of which are smaller than goshawks to a certain degree) may be confused with them on occasion despite the differing proportions of these hawks, which all have longer wings and shorter tails relative to their size. A species so similar it is sometimes nicknamed the "Mexican goshawk", gray hawk (Buteo plagiatus) juveniles (overlapping with true goshawks in the southwest United States into Mexico) have contrasting face pattern with bold dusky eye-stripes, dark eyes, barred thighs and a bold white "U" on the uppertail coverts. The roadside hawk (Rupornis magnirostris) (rarely in same range in Mexico) is noticeably smaller with paddle-shaped wings, barred lower breast and a buff "U" on undertail coverts in young birds. Somewhat less likely to confuse despite their broader extent of overlap are the red-shouldered hawk (Buteo lineatus) which have a narrow white-barred, dark-looking tail, bold white crescents on their primaries and dark wing edges and the broad-winged hawk (Buteo playpterus) which also has dark wing edges and a differing tapered wing shape. Even wintering gyrfalcon (Falco rusticolus) juveniles have been mistaken for goshawks and vice versa on occasion, especially when observed distantly perched. However, the bulkier, broader headed yet relatively shorter tailed falcon still has many tell-tale falcon characteristics like pointed, longer wings, a brown malar stripe as well as its more extensive barring both above and below.

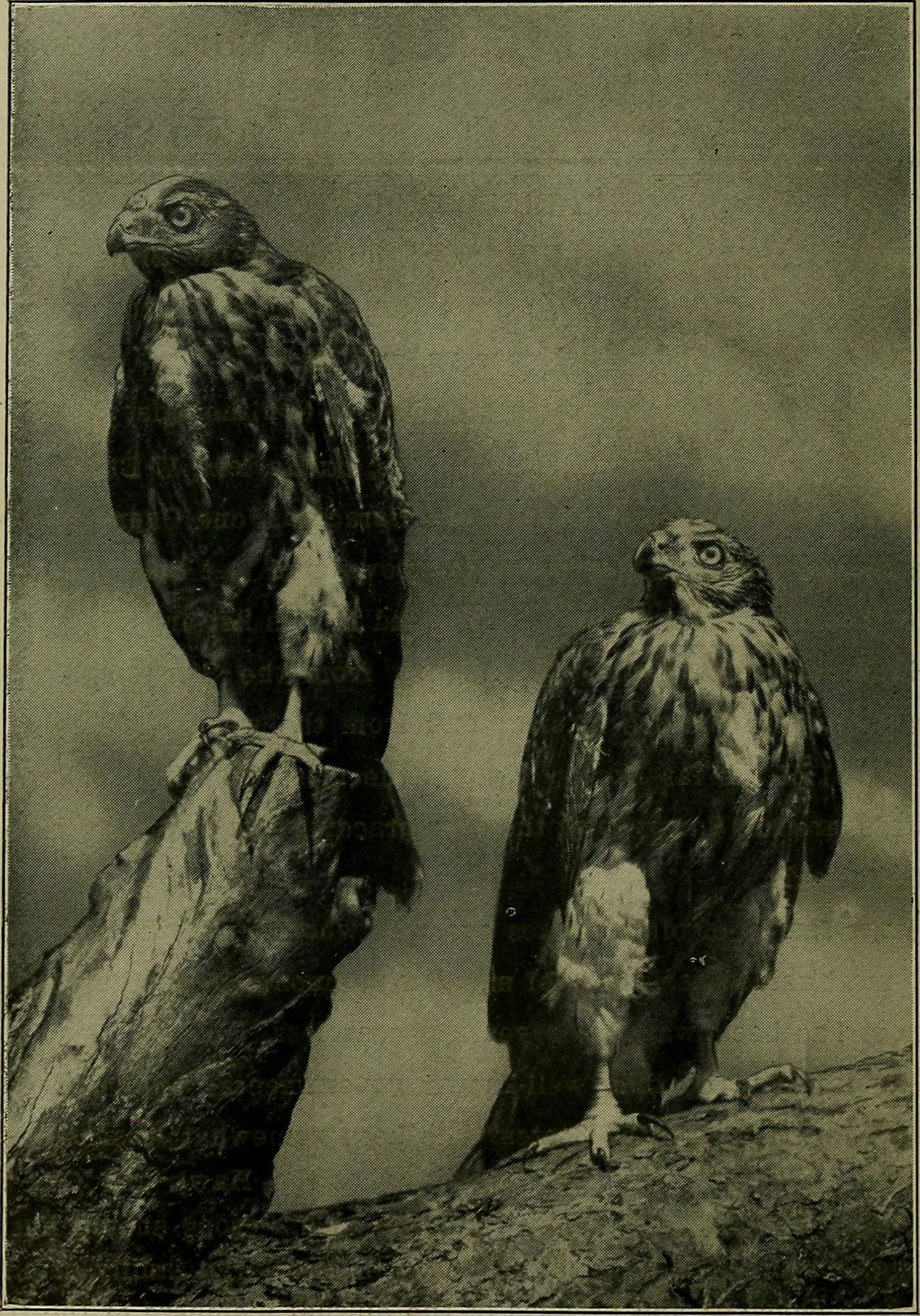
Two juveniles from Pennsylvania after they've become "branchers", or have left the nest but are not yet flying competently

Juveniles are sometimes confused with the smaller Cooper's hawk (Astur cooperii), especially juvenile Cooper's hawks. Unlike in Europe with sparrowhawks, Cooper's hawks can have a largish appearance and juveniles may be regularly mistaken for the usually less locally numerous goshawk. However, the juvenile goshawk displays a heavier, vertical streaking pattern on chest and abdomen, with the juvenile Cooper's hawk streaking frequently (but not always) in a "teardrop" pattern wherein the streaking appears to taper at the top, as opposed to the more even streaking of the goshawk. The goshawk sometimes seems to have a shorter tail relative to its much broader body. Although there appears to be a size overlap between small male goshawks and large female Cooper's hawks, morphometric measurements (wing and tail length) of both species demonstrate no such overlap, although weight overlap can rarely occur due to variation in seasonal condition and food intake at time of weighing.

== Taxonomy ==
The genus Astur contains nine living species. This group of agile, smallish, forest-dwelling hawks has been in existence for possibly tens of millions of years, probably as an adaptation to the explosive numbers of small birds that began to occupy the world's forest in the last few eras. The harriers are the only group of extant diurnal raptors that seem to bear remotely close relation to this genus, whereas buteonines, Old World kites, sea eagles and chanting-goshawks are much more distantly related and all other modern accipitrids are not directly related.

Within the genus Astur, the American goshawk seems to belong to a superspecies with other larger goshawks from different portions of the world. Eurasian goshawk, found in Eurasia, was previously considered conspecific with American goshawk, formed the species complex "northern goshawk". Meyer's goshawk, found in the South Pacific, has been posited as the most likely to be the closest related living cousin to the northern goshawk, the somewhat puzzling gap in their respective ranges explained by other Palearctic raptors such as Bonelli's eagles (Aquila fasciata) and short-toed eagles (Circaetus gallicus) that have extant isolated tropical island populations and were probably part of the same southwest Pacific radiation that led to the Meyer's goshawk. A presumably older radiation of this group may have occurred in Africa, where it led to both the Henst's goshawk of Madagascar and the black sparrowhawk (Astur melanoleucus) of the mainland. While the Henst's goshawk quite resembles the northern goshawks, the black sparrowhawk is superficially described as a "sparrowhawk" due to its relatively much longer and finer legs than those of typical goshawks but overall its size and plumage (especially that of juveniles) is much more goshawk than sparrowhawk-like.

Genetic studies have indicated that the Cooper's hawk of North America is also fairly closely related to the northern goshawk, having been present in North America before either of the two North American species of Astur. However, the much smaller sharp-shinned hawk, which has similar plumage to the Cooper's hawk and seems to be most closely related to the Eurasian sparrowhawk, appears to have occupied North America the latest of the three North American species of Accipitrinae, despite having the broadest current distribution of any of the American members of Accipitrinae (extending down through much of South America).

=== Subspecies ===
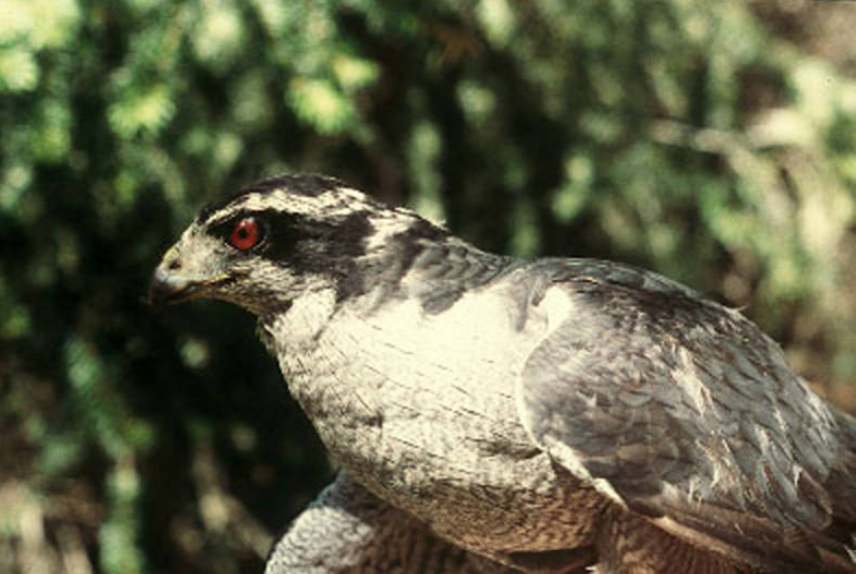
Typical adult from the American subspecies (A. a. atricapillus) showing its strong supercilium, red eyes, black head, and blue-gray back

- A. a. atricapillus (Wilson, 1812) – This subspecies occupies a majority of the species' range in North America, excluding some islands of the Pacific Northwest and the southern part of the American Southwest. American goshawks are generally slightly smaller on average than most Eurasian ones, although there are regional differences in size that confirm mildly to Bergmann's rule within this race. Furthermore, sexual dimorphism in size is notably less pronounced in American goshawks than in most Eurasian races. Overall, the wing chord is 308 to 337 mm (12.1 to 13.3 in) in males and 324 to 359 mm (12.8 to 14.1 in) in females. Size within atricapillus based on body mass seems to be highest in interior Alaska, followed by the Great Lakes, is intermediate in the northwest United States from eastern Washington to the Dakotas as well as in southeast Alaska thence decreasing mildly along the Pacific in Oregon and California and smallest of all within the race in the Great Basin and Colorado Plateau states (i.e. Nevada, Utah and northern and central Arizona). Conspicuously, wing size did not correspond to variations in body mass and more southerly goshawks were frequently longer winged than the more massive northerly ones. Male atricapillus goshawk have been found to weigh from 655 to 1,200 g (1.444 to 2.646 lb) and females from 758 to 1,562 g (1.671 to 3.444 lb). The lightest reported mean weights were from goshawks in northern and central Arizona, weighing a mean of 680 g (1.50 lb) in males and 935 g (2.061 lb) while the highest were from a small sample of Alaskan goshawks which weighed some 905 g (1.995 lb) in males and 1,190 g (2.62 lb) in females. Almost identical mean weights for goshawks as in Alaska were recorded for goshawks from Alberta as well. This race is typically a blue-gray color above with a boldly contrasting black head and broad white supercilia. American goshawks are often grayish below with fine gray waving barring and, compared to most Eurasian goshawks, rather apparent black shaft streaks which in combination create a vermiculated effect that is all-together messier looking than in most Eurasian birds. From a distance, atricapillus can easily appear solidly all-gray from the front. Due to this, the adult goshawk in America is sometimes called the "gray ghost", a name also somewhat more commonly used for adult male hen harriers. Birds from mainland Alaska tend to be paler overall with more pale flecking than other American goshawks.
- A. a. laingi Tavernier, 1940 – This insular race is found on Haida Gwaii and Vancouver Island. This subspecies is slightly smaller than the goshawks found on the mainland and is linearly the smallest race on average in North America. The wing chord of males can range from 312 to 325 mm (12.3 to 12.8 in) and that of females is 332 to 360 mm (13.1 to 14.2 in) and is on average nearly 5% smaller than those sampled goshawks from the nearby mainland. These goshawks are characteristically darker than mainland goshawks with the black of the crown extending to the interscapulars. The underside is a sootier gray overall.
- A. a. apache (van Rossem, 1938) – The range of this subspecies extends from southern Arizona and New Mexico down throughout the species' range in Mexico. This subspecies has the longest median wing size of any race, running contrary to Bergmann's rule that northern birds should outsize southern ones in widely distributed temperate species. In males the wing chord ranges from 344 to 354 mm (13.5 to 13.9 in) while in females it ranges from 365 to 390 mm (14.4 to 15.4 in). However, in terms of body mass, it is only slightly heavier than the goshawks found discontinuously somewhat to the north in the Great Basin and the Colorado Plateau and lighter than the heaviest known American goshawks from Alaska, Alberta and Wisconsin despite exceeding the goshawks from these areas in wing size. The weight of 49 males ranged from 631 to 744 g (1.391 to 1.640 lb), averaging 704 g (1.552 lb), while that of 88 females from two studies ranged from 845 to 1,265 g (1.863 to 2.789 lb), averaging 1,006 g (2.218 lb). Aside from its overall larger size, apache reportedly averages larger in foot size than most other American goshawks. Birds of this race tend to be darker than other American goshawks aside from the laingi type birds. Due to its shortage of distinct features beyond proportions, this is considered one of the more weakly separated among current separate subspecies, with some authors considering it merely a clinal variation of atricapillus. Even the greater wing size in southern birds follows a trend for the wing chord to increase in size in the south on the contrary to body mass.

== Behavior ==
=== Migration ===
Migratory goshawks in North America may move down to Baja California, Sinaloa and into most of west Texas, but generally in non-irruptive years, goshawks winter no further south than Nebraska, Iowa, Illinois, Indiana, eastern Tennessee and western North Carolina. Some periodic eruptions to nearly as far as the Gulf of Mexico have been recorded at no fewer than 10 years apart. In one case, a female that was banded in Wisconsin was recovered 1,860 km (1,160 mi) in Louisiana, a first ever record of the species in that state.

Prey availability may primarily dictate the proportion of goshawk populations that migrate and the selection of wintering areas, followed by the presence of snow which may aid prey capture in the short-term but in the long-term is likely to cause higher goshawk mortality. Showing the high variability of migratory movements, in one study of winter movements of adult female goshawks that bred in high-elevation forests of Utah, about 36% migrated 100 to 613 km (62 to 381 mi) to the general south, 22% migrated farther than that distance, 8.3% migrated less far, 2.7% went north instead of south and 31% stayed throughout winter on their breeding territory. Irruptive movements seem to occur for northern populations, i.e. those of the boreal forests in North America, Scandinavia, and possibly Siberia, with more equal sex ratio of movement and a strong southward tendency of movements in years where prey such as hares and grouse crash. Male young goshawks tend to disperse farther than females, which is unusual in birds, including raptors. It has been speculated that larger female juveniles displace male juveniles, forcing them to disperse farther, to the incidental benefit of the species' genetic diversity. In Cedar Grove, Wisconsin, there were more than twice as many juvenile males than females recorded migrating. At the hawk watch at Cape May Point State Park in New Jersey, few adult males and no adult females have been recorded in fall migration apart from irruptive years, indicating that migration is more important to juveniles. More juveniles were recorded migrating than adults in several years of study from Sweden. In northern Asturs including the goshawk, there seems to be multiple peaks in numbers of migrants, an observation that suggests partial segregation by age and sex.

== Dietary biology ==
=== Hunting behavior ===
In North America, goshawks are generally rather more likely than those from Eurasia to hunt within the confines of mature forest, excluding areas where prey numbers are larger outside of the forest, such as where scrub-dwelling cottontails are profuse.

=== Prey spectrum ===
Northern goshawks are usually opportunistic predators, as are most birds of prey. The most important prey species are small to medium-sized mammals and medium to large-sized birds found in forest, edge and scrub habitats.

However, a few prey families dominate the diet in most parts of the range, namely corvids, pigeons, grouse, pheasants, thrushes and woodpeckers (in roughly descending order of importance) among birds and squirrels (mainly tree squirrels but also ground squirrels especially in North America) and rabbits and hares among mammals.

Birds constitute 47.8% in 33 studies and mammals account for a nearly equal portion of the diet and in some areas rather dominate the food spectrum. There is some difference in size and type between the prey caught by males and larger females. Prey selection between sexes is more disparate in the more highly dimorphic races from Eurasia than those from North America. The average prey caught by each sex in Arizona was 281.5 g (9.93 oz) and 380.4 g (13.42 oz), respectively, or around a 26% difference.

=== Corvids ===
Overall, one prey family that is known to be taken in nearly every part of the goshawk's range is the corvids, although they do not necessarily dominate the diet in all areas. Some 24 species have been reported in the diet of Eurasian and American goshawks. The second most commonly reported prey species in breeding season dietary studies from North America is the 128 g (4.5 oz) Steller's jay (Cyanocitta stelleri). These species were recorded in studies from northwestern Oregon and the Kaibab Plateau of Arizona (where the Steller's made up 37% by number) as the main prey species by number. The conspicuously loud vocalizations, somewhat sluggish flight (when hunting adult or post-fledging individuals) and moderate size of these jays make them ideal for prey-gathering male goshawks. In the following areas Corvus species were the leading prey by number: the 457 g (1.008 lb) American crow (Corvus brachyrhynchos) in New York and Pennsylvania (44.8% by number). Despite evidence that northern goshawks avoid nesting near common ravens (Corvus corax), the largest widespread corvid (about the same size as a goshawk at 1,040 g (2.29 lb)) and a formidable opponent even one-on-one, they are even known to prey on ravens seldom. Corvids taken have ranged in size from the 72 g (2.5 oz) Canada jay (Perisoreus canadensis) to the raven.

=== Pigeons and doves ===
Most of American goshawks take pigeons less commonly than Eurasian goshawks. One exception is in Connecticut where the mourning dove (Zenaida macroura), the smallest known pigeon or dove the goshawk has hunted at 119 g (4.2 oz), was the second most numerous prey species.

=== Gamebirds ===
The American goshawk is in some parts of its range considered a specialized predator of gamebirds, particularly grouse. All told 33 species of this order have turned up in American and Eurasian goshawks' diet, including most of the species either native to or introduced in North America and Europe. Numerically, only in the well-studied taiga habitats of Canada and Alaska and some areas of the eastern United States do grouse typically take a dominant position. Elsewhere in the range, gamebirds are often secondary in number but often remain one of the most important contributors of prey biomass to nests. With their general ground-dwelling habits, gamebirds tend to be fairly easy for goshawks to overtake if they remain unseen and, if made aware of the goshawk, the prey chooses to run rather than fly. If frightened too soon, gamebirds may take flight and may be chased for some time, although the capture rates are reduced considerably when this occurs. Pre-fledgling chicks of gamebirds are particularly vulnerable due to the fact that they can only run when being pursued. There are impressive feats of attacks on other particularly large gamebirds have been reported, in at least one case, successful predation on an estimated 3,900 g (8.6 lb) adult-sized young wild turkey (Meleagris gallopavo) hen by an immature female goshawk weighing approximately 1,050 g (2.31 lb)), although taking adults of much larger-bodied prey like this is considered generally rare, the young chicks and poults of such prey species are likely much more often taken.

Despite reports that grouse are less significant as prey to American goshawks, the 560 g (1.23 lb) ruffed grouse (Bonasa umbellus) is one of the most important prey species in North America (fourth most reported prey species in 22 studies), having been the leading prey species for goshawks in studies from New York, New Jersey and Connecticut (from 12 to 25% of prey selected) and reported as taken in high numbers elsewhere in several parts of their mutual range. The 1,056 g (2.328 lb) sooty grouse (Dendragapus fuliginosus) was reported as the leading prey species in southern Alaska (28.4% by number). In the boreal forests of Alberta, grouse are fairly important prey especially in winter.

=== Squirrels ===
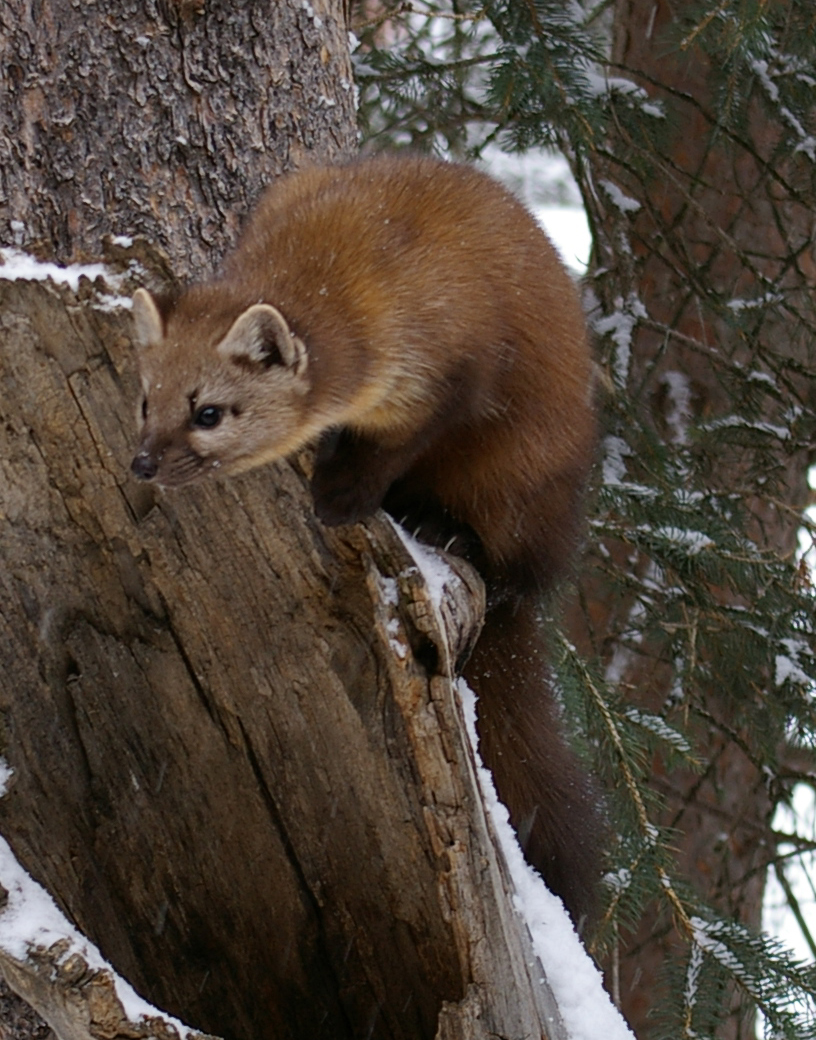
Prey selection frequently overlaps between goshawks and American martens, seldom will both species prey on the other

In North America, tree squirrels are even more significant as prey, particularly the modestly-sized pine squirrels which are the single most important prey type for American goshawks overall. Particularly the 240 g (8.5 oz) American red squirrel (Tamiasciurus hudsonicus) is significant, being the primary prey in studies from Minnesota, South Dakota, Wyoming and Montana (in each comprising more than 30% of the diet and present in more than half of known pellets) but also reported everywhere in their foods from the eastern United States to Alaska and Arizona. Much like the American marten (Martes americana), the American distribution of goshawks is largely concurrent with that of American red squirrels, indicating the particular significance of it as a dietary staple. In the Pacific Northwest, the 165 g (5.8 oz) Douglas squirrel (Tamiasciurus douglasii) replaces the red squirrel in both distribution and as the highest contributor to goshawk diets from northern California to British Columbia. The largest occurrence of Douglas squirrel known was from Lake Tahoe, where they constituted 23% of prey by number and 32.9% by weight.

Larger tree squirrels are also taken opportunistically, in New York, New Jersey and Connecticut, the 530 g (1.17 lb) eastern gray squirrel (Sciurus carolinensis) was the third most significant prey species. Much larger tree squirrels such as western gray squirrels (Sciurus griseus) and fox squirrels (Sciurus niger), both weighing about 800 g (1.8 lb), are taken occasionally in North America. Ground squirrels are also important prey species, mostly in North America, 25 of 44 of squirrel species found in the diet are ground squirrels. Particularly widely reported as a secondary food staple from Oregon, Wyoming, California and Arizona was the 187 g (6.6 oz) golden-mantled ground squirrel (Callospermophilus lateralis). In Nevada and Idaho's Sawtooth National Forest, the 285 g (10.1 oz) Belding's ground squirrel (Urocitellus beldingi) fully dominated the food spectrum, comprising up to 74.3% of the prey by number and 84.2% by biomass. Even much bigger ground squirrels such as prairie dogs and marmots are attacked on occasion. Several hoary marmots (Marmota caligala) were brought to nests in southeast Alaska but averaged only 1,894 g (4.176 lb), so were young animals about half of the average adult (spring) weight (albeit still considerably heavier than the goshawks who took them). In some cases, adult marmots such as alpine marmots (Marmota marmota), yellow-bellied marmots (Marmota flaviventris) and woodchucks (Marmota monax) have been preyed upon when lighter and weaker in spring, collectively weighing on average about 3,500 g (7.7 lb) or about three times as much as a female goshawk although are basically half of what these marmots can weigh by fall. About a dozen species of chipmunk are known to be taken by goshawks and the 96 g (3.4 oz) eastern chipmunks (Tamias striatus) were the second most numerous prey species at nests in central New York and Minnesota. Squirrels taken have ranged in size from the 43 g (1.5 oz) least chipmunk (Tamias minimus) to the aforementioned adult marmots.

=== Hares and rabbits ===
Mammals are more important in their diet than in Eurasian goshawk's, more lagomorphs are taken. In Oregon, snowshoe hares (Lepus americanus) are the largest contributor of biomass to goshawks foods (making up to 36.6% of the prey by weight), in eastern Oregon at least 60% of hares taken were adults weighing on average 1,500 g (3.3 lb), and in one of three studies from Oregon be the most numerous prey species (second most numerous in the other two). This species was also the second most numerous food species in Alberta throughout the year and the most important prey by weight. Eastern cottontails (Sylvilagus floridanus), also averaging some 1,500 g (3.3 lb) in mass per the study (and thus mostly consisting of adult cottontails in their prime), were the most significant prey both by weight (42.3%) and number (13.3%) in Apache-Sitgreaves National Forest of Arizona. Eastern cottontails are also taken regularly in New York and Pennsylvania. In some parts of the range, larger leporids may be attacked, extending to the 2,410 g (5.31 lb) black-tailed (Lepus californicus) and the 3,200 g (7.1 lb) white-tailed jackrabbit (Lepus townsendii). American goshawks also take pikas, much smaller cousins of rabbits and hares, but they are at best supplementary prey for American goshawks.

=== Other birds ===
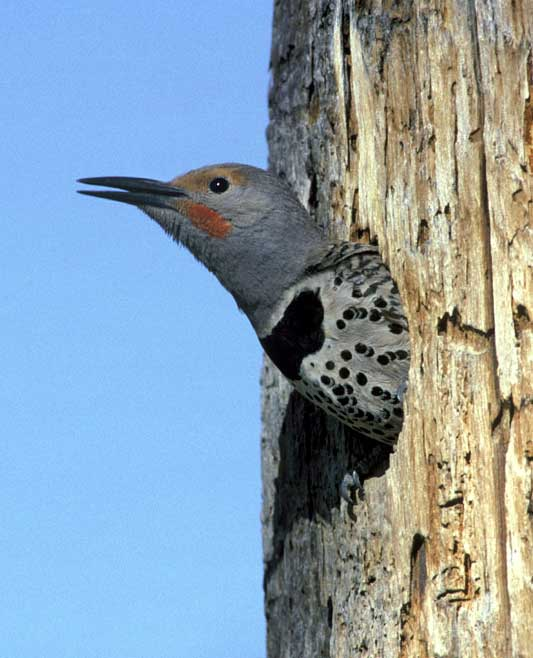
Woodpeckers such as northern flickers often fall victim to goshawks

Some 21 species of woodpecker have been reported from northern goshawk food studies around the world. With their relatively slow, undulating flight adult and fledged woodpeckers can easily be overtaken by hunting goshawks, not to mention their habitat preferences frequently put them within active goshawk ranges. Most of the widespread species from North America have been observed as prey, most commonly relatively large woodpeckers such as the 134 g (4.7 oz) northern flicker (Colaptes auratus) in North America. Indeed, the flicker is the third most regularly reported prey species in America. In south-central Wyoming, the northern flicker was the second most numerous prey species and it was the main prey species in a study from New Mexico (here making up 26.4% of prey by number). All sizes of woodpeckers available are taken from the 25.6 g (0.90 oz) downy woodpecker (Picoides pubescens) to the 287 g (10.1 oz) pileated woodpecker (Dryocopus pileatus) in North America. In many areas, American goshawks will pursue water birds of several varieties, although they rarely form a large portion of the diet. Perhaps the most often recorded water birds in the diet are ducks. All told, 32 waterfowl have been recorded in Eurasian and American goshawks' diet. The ducks of the genus Aythya are somewhat frequently recorded as well, especially since their tree-nesting habits may frequently put them in the hunting range of nesting goshawks. Similarly, the wood duck (Aix sponsa) may be more vulnerable than most waterfowl at their tree nests. Adult common eiders (Somateria mollissima), the largest northern duck at 2,066 g (4.555 lb), have also been captured by goshawks. Various other water birds reported as taken include red-throated loon (Gavia stellata) chicks, adult great cormorants (Phalacrocorax carbo) (about the same size as a greater white-fronted goose), and five species each of heron and rail. Among shorebirds (or small waders), goshawks have been reported preying on more than 22 sandpipers, more than 8 plovers, more than 10 species each of gull and tern, more than 2 species of alcids and the long-tailed jaeger (Stercorarius longicaudus).

Corvids as aforementioned are quite important prey. Although they take fewer passerines than other northern Accipiters, smaller types of songbirds can still be regionally important to the diet. This is especially true of the thrushes. All common Turdus species are taken in some numbers. Smaller numbers of thrush are taken in general but the 78 g (2.8 oz) American robin (Turdus migratorius) are fairly regular prey nonetheless and were the most numerous prey in the Sierra Nevadas of California (30.7% by number and 21.4% by weight). Thrush taken have ranged in size from the 26.4 g (0.93 oz) western bluebird (Sialia mexicana), the smallest bluebird and lightest North American thrush on average, to some larger thrush. Beyond corvids and thrushes, most passerines encountered by American goshawks are substantially smaller and are often ignored under most circumstances in favor of more sizable prey. Nonetheless, more than a hundred passerines have been recorded their diet beyond these families. Most widespread passerine families from North America and Europe have occasional losses to goshawks, including tyrant flycatchers, shrikes, vireos, larks, swallows, nuthatches, treecreepers, mimids, pipits and wagtails, starlings, New World warblers, cardinalids, icterids, finches. Avian prey has even ranged to as small as the 5.5 g (0.19 oz) goldcrest (Regulus regulus), the smallest bird in Europe. Among smaller types of passerines, one of the most widely reported are finches and, in some widespread studies, somewhat substantial numbers of finches of many species may actually be taken. Finches tend to fly more conspicuously as they cover longer distances, often bounding or undulating as they do, over the canopy than most forest songbirds, which may make them more susceptible to goshawk attacks than other small songbirds. Non-passerine upland birds taken by goshawks in small numbers include but are not limited to nightjars, swifts, kingfishers, and parrots.

=== Interspecies predatory relationships ===
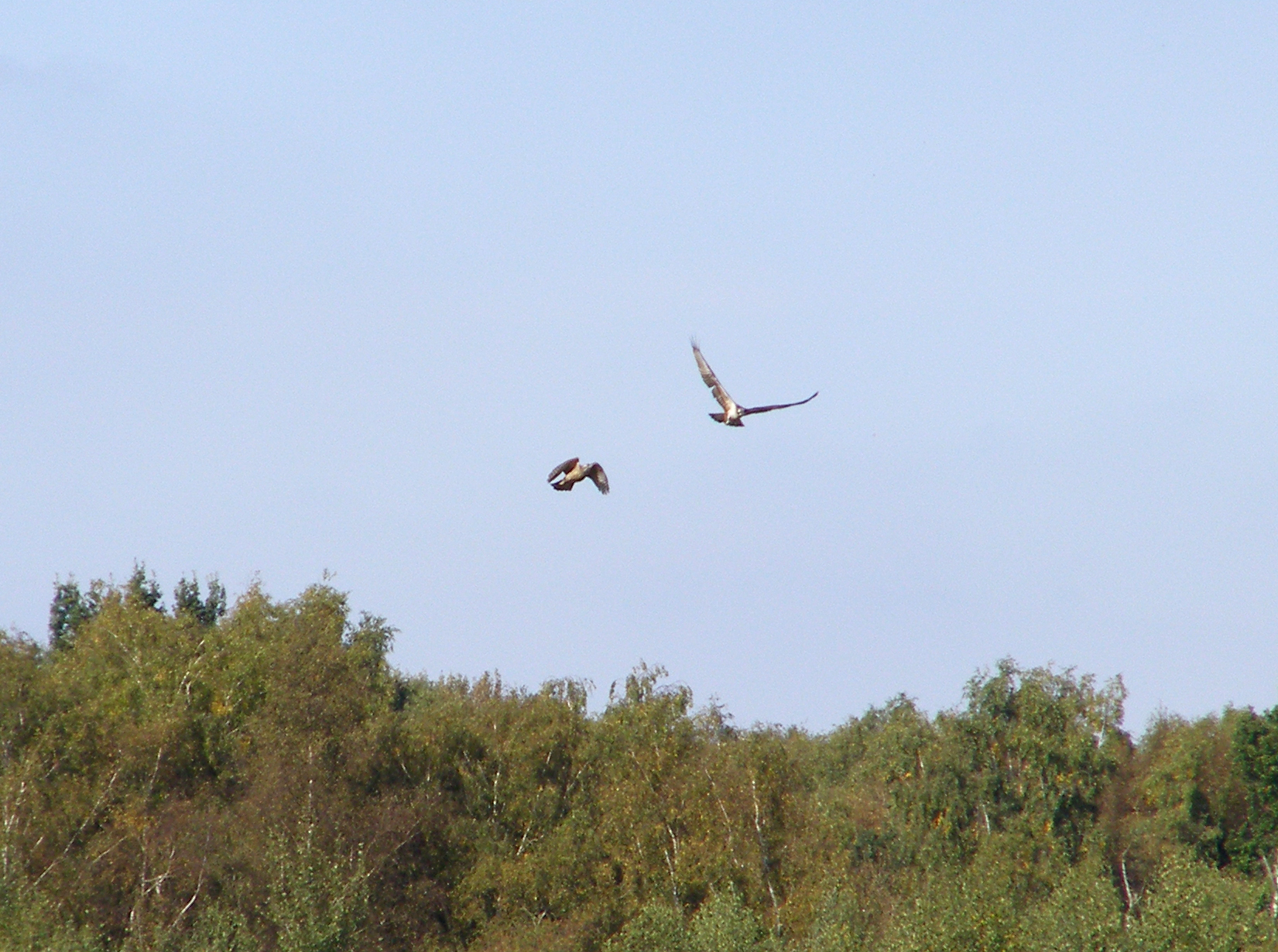
Chasing an osprey, most likely to rob it of food, but the osprey is even considered possible prey

Eurasian goshawks are often near the top of the avian food chain in forested biomes but face competition for food resources from various other predators. The mean prey mass for sharp-shinned and Cooper's hawks in North America is between about 10 and 30% of their own mass, whereas the mean prey of American goshawks is between about 25 and 50% of their mass and therefore are the goshawks takes prey that is on average relatively much larger.

In many of the ecosystems that they inhabit, American goshawks compete with resources with other predators, particularly where they take sizeable numbers of lagomorphs. About a dozen mammalian and avian predators in each area primarily consume snowshoe hares alongside goshawks in the American boreal forest regions where these became primary staple foods. Like those cohabitant predators, the goshawk suffers declines during the low portion of the lagomorph's breeding cycles, which rise and fall cyclically every 10 years. However, even where these are primary food sources, the American goshawk is less specialized than many other raptors and can alternate their food selection, often taking equal or greater numbers of tree squirrels and woodland birds. Due to this dietary variation, the northern goshawk is less affected than other raptorial birds by prey population cycles and tends to not be depleted by resource competition.

Despite their propensity to pursue relatively large prey and capability to pursue alternate prey, American goshawks can be locally outcompeted for resources by species that are more adaptable and flexible, especially in terms of habitat and prey. Most northern buteonine hawks largely take small rodents such as voles (which are usually ignored by goshawks) but can adapt to nearly any other type of prey when the staple local rodent prey populations go down. Comparisons with goshawks and red-tailed hawk nesting in abutting areas of Arizona (other large common Buteos like Swainson's hawks (Buteo swainsonii) and ferruginous hawks (Buteo regalis) utilize open habitats and so do not come into conflict with goshawks) shows the red-tailed hawks as being able to take a broader range of prey than goshawks and nest in more varied habitats, the latter species being perhaps the most commonly seen, widespread and adaptable of diurnal American raptors.

American goshawks are less prone to nesting outside of mature forests and take larger numbers of mammals as opposed to abundant birds than in Europe. This may be in part due to heavier competition from a greater diversity of raptors in North America. In Europe, the goshawk only co-exists with the much smaller sparrowhawk within its own genus, while in North America, it lives with the intermediately-sized Cooper's hawk. The latter species much more readily nests in semi-open and developed areas of North America than goshawks there and hunts a broad assemblage of medium-sized birds, whereas such prey is more readily available to male goshawks from Europe than to goshawks in North America. Although the Cooper's hawk usually avoids and loses individual contests against the larger goshawk, its adaptability has allowed it to become the most widespread and commonly found North American Accipiter.

American goshawks are slightly smaller on average than their European counterparts and can be up to 10% smaller in mass than red-tailed hawks. However, studies have indicated that the goshawk has, beyond its superior speed and agility, has stronger feet and a more forceful attack than that of the red-tailed hawk. All in all, individual competitions between red-tailed hawks and goshawks can go either way and neither is strongly likely to deter the other from nesting given their distinct nesting habitats. Other raptors, including most medium to large-sized owls as well as red-tailed hawks and falcons, will use nests built by northern goshawks, even when goshawks are still in the area.

To many other raptorial birds, the northern goshawk is more significant as a predatory threat than as competition. American goshawk predate other accipiters such as the 136 g (4.8 oz) sharp-shinned hawk and the 440 g (0.97 lb) Cooper's hawk. Among Buteo hawks, the adults of 424 g (15.0 oz) broad-winged hawk (Buteo platypterus), 610 g (1.34 lb) red-shouldered hawk (Buteo lineatus) and the 1,065 g (2.348 lb) red-tailed hawk are known to be killed. American goshawks also pose a threat to osprey (Pandion haliaetus) chicks.

== Status ==
The breeding range of the American goshawk extends over one-third of North America, a total area of over 30,000,000 km^{2} (12,000,000 sq mi) for Eurasian and American goshawk. There are a broadly estimated 150,000–300,000 individuals in North America. Most western populations at mid-latitudes have approximately 3.6–10.7 pairs/100 km^{2} (39 sq mi). A total of 107 nesting territories (1991–1996) were located on a 1,754 km^{2} (677 sq mi) study area on the Kaibab Plateau, AZ, resulting in a density of 8.4 pairs/100 km^{2} (39 sq mi). The estimated density in Pennsylvania (1.17 pairs/100 km^{2} (39 sq mi)) suggests that eastern populations may occur at lower densities than western populations, but densities of eastern populations may increase as these populations recover. Typically, populations at far northern latitudes may occur at lower densities than those of southwestern and western populations in North America. Although median densities was similar, populations are overall much denser in Europe than in North America. Per the IUCN, the global population of American and Eurasian goshawk is estimated to consist of 1 million to nearly 2.5 million birds, making this one of the most numerous species complex in its diverse family (the red-tailed hawk and black kite both may have a similar global population size, whereas the Eurasian sparrowhawk and common buzzard are possibly slightly more numerous than goshawks despite their smaller ranges).

Based on studies from Gotland, Finland and the southwestern United States, annual mortality for adults is 15–21%, however, feather results indicate that annual mortality for adult Eurasian goshawks is up to 7% higher in Europe than American goshawks in North America. In many parts of the range, historic populations decreased regionally due to human persecution (especially shooting), disturbance and epidemic loss of habitat, especially during the 19th century and early 20th. Some states, like Pennsylvania, paid $5 bounties on Goshawks in the 1930s.

In the 1950s–1960s declines were increasingly linked with pesticide pollution. However, in early 1970s pesticide levels in the United States for goshawks were low. Eggshell thinning has not been a problem for most populations, although California eggshells (weight and thickness index) pre-1947 (pre-DDT) to 1947—1964 (DDT in use) declined some 8-12%. In Illinois, migratory goshawks during the winter of 1972-1973 invasion year contained less organochlorine and PCB residues than did other raptors, however, these birds were probably from nonagricultural, northern forests.

Seemingly the remaining persistent conservation threat to goshawks, given their seeming overall resilience (at the species level) to both persecution and pesticides, is deforestation. Timber harvests are known to destroy many nests and adversely regional populations. Harvest methods that create extensive areas of reduced forest canopy cover, dropping to cover less than 35-40%, may be especially detrimental as cases of this usually cause all goshawks to disappear from the area. However, the mortality rates due to foresting practices are unknown and it is possible that some mature goshawks may simply be able to shift to other regions when a habitat becomes unsuitable but this is presumably unsustainable in the long-term. In harvest forests of California, where overstory trees are frequently removed, goshawks have been found to successfully remain as breeding species as long as some mature stands are left intact. Despite the decline of habitat quality and the frequent disturbances, this region's goshawks breeding success rates somewhat improbably did not reduce. Based on habitat usage studied in New Jersey and New York, this adaptability is not seen everywhere, as here nests were further from human habitation than expected on the basis of available habitat, an observation suggesting that disturbance regionally can reduce habitat quality. Similarly, studies from the American southwest and Canada have indicated that heavily logged areas caused strong long-term regional declines for goshawks. In Arizona, it was found that even when the nests were left intact, the noisy timber harvest work often caused failure of nesting during the incubation stage, and all nesting attempts that were occurring within 50 to 100 m (160 to 330 ft) of active logging failed, frequently after parents abandoned the nest. Other noisy activity, such as camping, have also caused nests to fail. Wildlife researchers and biologists do not seem to negatively affect goshawk nests, as they know to keep forays to the nest brief and capture of adult goshawks for radio-tagging was found to not harm their success at raising broods.

In North America, several non-governmental conservation organizations petitioned the Department of Interior, United States Fish & Wildlife Service (1991 & 1997) to list the goshawk as "threatened" or "endangered" under the authority of the Endangered Species Act. Both petitions argued for listing primarily on the basis of historic and ongoing nesting habitat loss, specifically the loss of old-growth and mature forest stands throughout the goshawk's known range. In both instances, the U.S. Fish & Wildlife Service concluded that listing was not warranted, but state and federal natural resource agencies responded during the petition process with standardized and long-term goshawk inventory and monitoring efforts, especially throughout U.S. Forest Service lands in the Western U.S. The United States Forest Service (US Dept of Agriculture) has listed the goshawk as a "sensitive species", while it also benefits from various protections at the state level. In North America, the goshawk is federally protected under the Migratory Bird Treaty Act of 1918 by an amendment incorporating native birds of prey into the Act in 1972. The American goshawk (as subspecies of northern goshawk, currently Eurasian goshawk) is also listed in Appendix II of the Convention on International Trade in Endangered Species (CITES).
