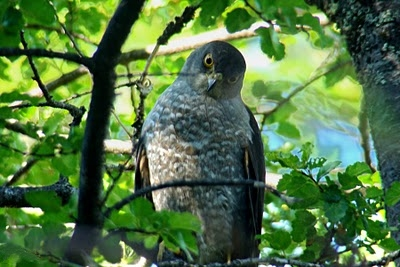

Scientific classification
- Kingdom: Animalia
- Phylum: Chordata
- Class: Aves
- Order: Accipitriformes
- Family: Accipitridae
- Genus: Astur
- Species: A. chilensis

Binomial name
- Astur chilensis (Philippi & Landbeck, 1864)

Synonyms
- Accipiter bicolor chilensis Philippi & Landbeck, 1864 (but see text)

= Chilean hawk =

Species of bird

The Chilean hawk (Astur chilensis) is a bird of prey species belonging to the family Accipitridae. It was formerly placed in the genus Accipiter. It breeds in Andes forests from central Chile and western Argentina south to Tierra del Fuego, from sea level to 2,700 m altitude (though birds are rarely observed above 1,000 m). Some winter apparently in the lowlands of NW Argentina.

It is sometimes considered to be a subspecies of its northern relative the bicolored hawk (Astur bicolor), including by the American Ornithological Society and sometimes a distinct species. The two show differences in habitat preference and have allopatric distributions. But the situation is complicated by the subspecies pileatus, which is intermediate in plumage between bicolor and chilensis, and has been variously assigned to either species by those that consider them distinct.

== Description ==
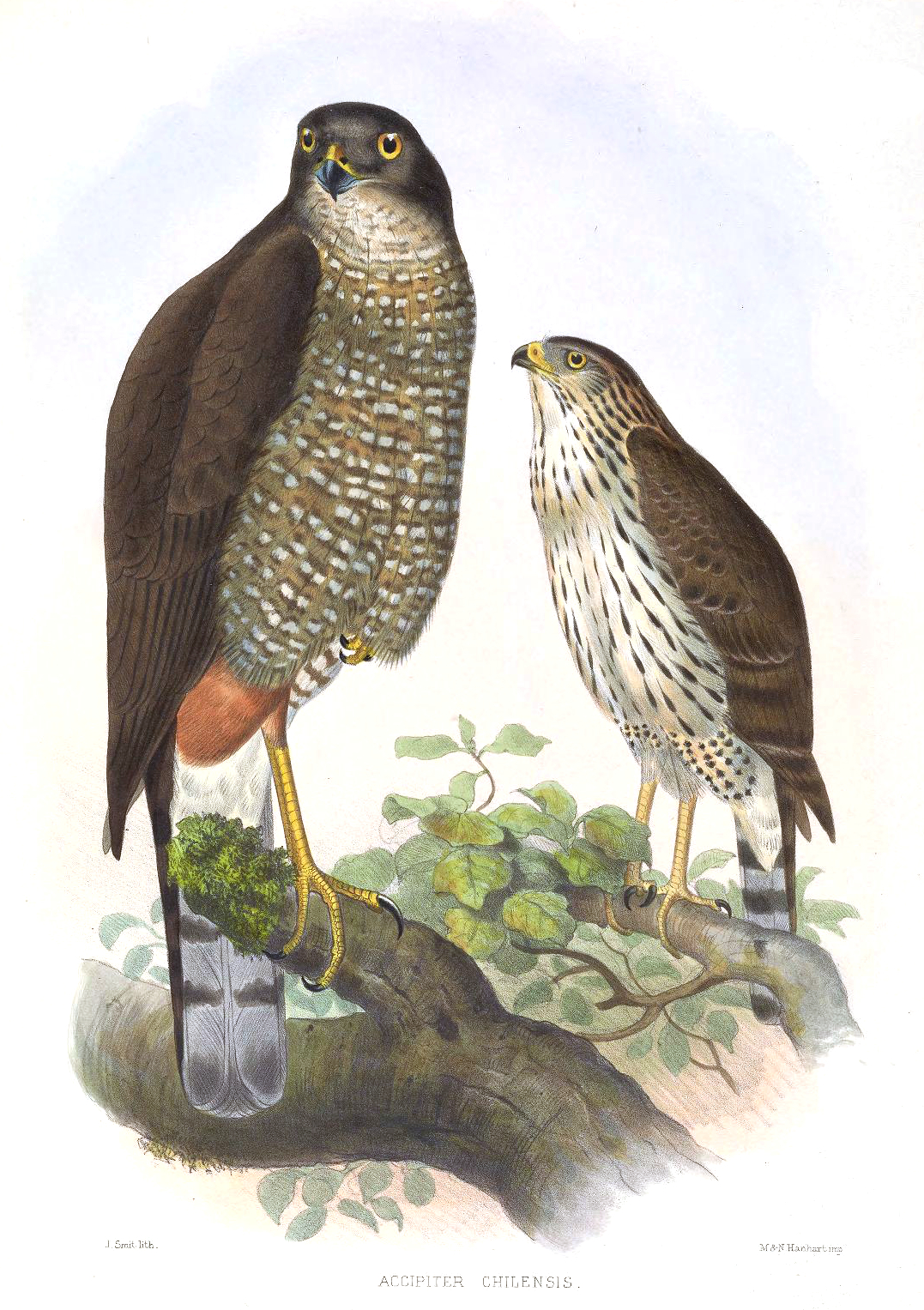

The male is 37 to 38 cm long, while the larger female measures 41 to 42 cm. The adults have black upperparts, and an ash-grey chest and abdomen with dark barring. The throat has longitudinal dark stripes and the undertail is white. The uppertail is brown with 5 or 6 dark bands. The legs are greenish yellow, and the eyes are yellow. The sexes have similar plumage.

Young birds have browner upperparts with cream fringes to the feathers. The paler chest and abdomen have longitudinal stripes. The paler uppertail makes the banding more obvious.

Birds are only vocal during the breeding season. While engaging in reproductive activity, its calls do not seem to differ from those of the bicoloured hawk. This has at least two rather high-pitched scolding vocalizations: a barking row of keh or kow, and a woodpecker-like faster and accelerating staccato of kek calls. These are given near the nest and might announce intruders such as the scientists coming to study the birds. A series of higher-pitched kie, given by a definite Chilean hawk under similar circumstances, might replace one of the above, or it might be a distinct type of call. Pairmates address each other with a squealing waaah, and a soft clear whistle is apparently used by parents to communicate something to the young.

== Distribution ==
In Argentina, it is found north to Neuquén Province at about 36° latitude. The northern limit of the breeding range in Chile is not well known. In significant numbers, the Chilean hawk probably only occurs north to O'Higgins Region, though it at least occasionally breeds in Valparaíso Region, and perhaps also in Coquimbo Region and Fray Jorge National Park from where there are a few sightings. The southern limit is generally accepted to be at about 55° latitude in Tierra del Fuego.

Their movement patterns are not well resolved. Generally it seems to be sedentary, but there is a seasonal influx of Chilean hawks to NW Argentina. Perhaps they follow the swarms of migrant passerines or even Chilean pigeons (Columba araucana). It has been recorded as breeding in Magallanes Province but migrating away afterwards. Young birds seem to be quite prone to vagrancy: there is one certain and one possible record from Tafí del Valle and Oasis de Pica, respectively; both locations are hundreds of kilometers north even of the suspected breeding range.

== Ecology ==
The Chilean hawk is specifically found in temperate forest. Far more rarely, it is also found in sclerophyllous forest, parkland and mixed forest and open habitat. Top hunt, it also visits open areas like shrubland, grassland or agricultural land to hunt. It is rarely if ever seen in heavily human-modified habitat however, and the few individuals that have been encountered in city parks and gardens are probably not resident birds. As it seems, it requires not much less than 200 hectares of native forest to breed.

Typically, forest inhabited by this bird is dominated by Araucaria and southern beech (Nothofagus). Particular species that have been recorded are coihue (N. dombeyi), hualle (N. obliqua) and lenga (N. pumilio). It probably tolerates some logging, as long as the native character of the forest is not altered. Secondary growth with abundant mature trees remaining and dense undergrowth, e.g. of South American mountain bamboo (Chusquea), as caused by limited logging activity, may even be prime breeding habitat, although too little is known to be certain. When enough native forest is present, plantations, e.g. of introduced pines, are also utilized.

During the day, it likes to perch on branches in its territory, moving between favorite areas of forest in low flight. Areas with strong human activity like settlements are approached cautiously; it is generally not a bird that announces its presence. Pairs split outside the breeding season; it is not studied whether they are monogamous only during the breeding season or for several seasons. It seldom soars unrelated to reproductive activity. Males do aerobatic displays in courtship, such as a double loop resembling an upright "8".

The louse Colpocephalum turbinatum was found on a museum specimen of the Chilean hawk, but whether it actually parasitizes these birds or had simply crossed over from some other specimen is not known.

=== Food and feeding ===
It is not well known how this carnivore catches its prey, but as it seems it is optimized for pursuit of small and maneuvrable birds throughout all levels of the forest. It is also able to seize large insects in mid-air. Both active searching for prey and sitting in ambush to wait what might come along has been observed. During the breeding season, pairs may cooperate in hunting; their different sizes ensures that they do not compete for prey much.

The Chilean hawk's food is almost exclusively birds (97.8% of all prey remains in one study), in particular a diverse selection of forest passerines. More than 30 bird species are documented to be eaten by this hawk at least occasionally. Rodents of at least 4 species and every now and then an occasional insect or squamate round off its diet.

The Chilean hawk hunts forest passerines quite indiscriminately of species, habitat or habits provided they have the right size, though it has a preference for species that live closer to the forest floor. Depending on availability, favorite prey species include thorn-tailed rayadito (Aphrastura spinicauda) black-chinned siskin (Carduelis barbata), white-crested elaenia (Elaenia albiceps), Austral thrush (Turdus falcklandii) and fire-eyed diucon (Xolmis pyrope). It has been claimed that the Chilean pigeon (Columba araucana) constitutes important prey, but this seems only to be correct at certain times or places, if at all.

=== Reproduction ===
This hawk breeds in the austral summer. Pairs apparently form from mid-late October on. Incubating birds have been observed in December, and chicks are seen from about New Year's Eve to February, after which the families disperse again. A 1937 nest and a 1945 egg description of the Chilean hawk appear to be based on a misidentification; the nest at least was probably of the chimango caracara (Milvago chimango).

The oval platform nest measures about 50–80 by 50–60 cm and is some 25 cm high when freshly built. Some nests are more than twice as high; these might have been used in several years. It is built from strongly intertwined dry twigs and sticks. It is placed on forked branches in the upper part of a tree, close to the main trunk or a main vertical branch, some 16–20 m above ground. At least locally, full-grown coihue trees (Nothofagus dombeyi) seem to be much preferred for nesting. Nests are sometimes reused in successive seasons, but more often a new nest is constructed in a different tree every season.

The clutch is probably two, sometimes three and rarely one, as usual for Accipitridae. The eggs are dull light bluish to off-white all over and are shaped like a chicken's egg. The eggshell's inside has a slightly more pronounced bluish tinge. Incubation lasts probably about 3 weeks. The parents defend their nesting grounds against other birds of prey, such as the red-backed hawk (Buteo polyosoma), and the golden eagle (Aquila chrysaetos); during approaches by such potentially dangerous species, the nestlings will tuck away their heads. It seems that 2 or 3 young are raised on a regular basis, unlike in many other Accipitridae where only the strongest nestling survives.

=== Status ===
Because of its forest habitat and secretive behaviour, the Chilean hawk is one of the least-studied raptors in the Patagonian temperate forest. It is considered relatively common in the Cape Horn region, e.g. in Ñuble National Reserve, population densities as high as 4 birds per square km have been recorded. Elsewhere, it is far less often seen and usually quite rare. Attempts to assess its population density are hampered by the fact that it requires a certain amount of prime habitat to settle in a locale at all. Thus, much otherwise suitable land might be under-utilized by these birds, and subpopulations have an extremely patchy distribution.

It is listed as a rare or insufficiently known species in Chile and legally protected under the Hunting Law. In Argentina it is not listed as threatened. On a global scale, it is a rare bird, though not under immediate threat. Populations may decline due to increasing habitat loss from extensive fires, logging pressures, and hunting. It is not evaluated by the IUCN, as they do not consider it specifically distinct, but is included on the CITES Appendix II as part of the blanket listing of Falconiformes.
