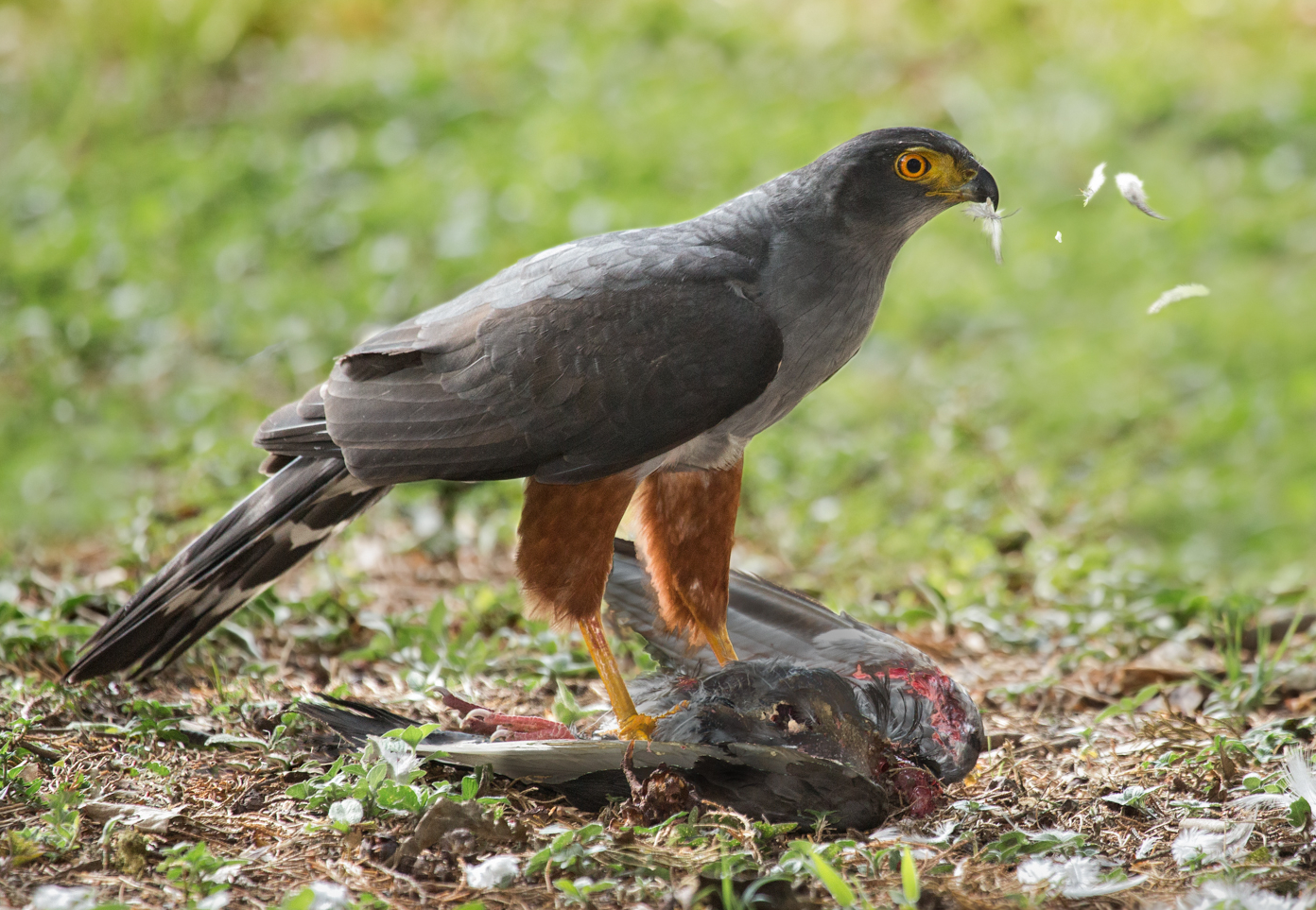

Conservation status
- Least Concern (IUCN 3.1)

Scientific classification
- Kingdom: Animalia
- Phylum: Chordata
- Class: Aves
- Order: Accipitriformes
- Family: Accipitridae
- Genus: Astur
- Species: A. bicolor

Binomial name
- Astur bicolor (Vieillot, 1817)

Subspecies
- A. b. bicolor - (Vieillot, 1817); A. b. fidens - (Bangs & Noble, 1918); A. b. guttifer - (Hellmayr, 1917); A. b. pileatus - (Temminck, 1823)

= Bicolored hawk =

Species of bird

The bicolored hawk (Astur bicolor) is a species of bird of prey in the family Accipitridae. It is found in forest, woodland, second growth, plantations, and wooded savanna in southeastern Mexico, Central America, and northern and central South America (as far south as northern Argentina). Though generally uncommon, it is the most common species of Astur in most of its range, but it does not occur at altitudes above 2,700 metres (8,900 ft) such as the highest parts of the Andes.

== Taxonomy ==
The bicolored hawk was formally described in 1817 by the French ornithologist Louis Vieillot under the binomial name Sparvius bicolor. He specified Cayenne in French Guiana as the type locality. The bicolored hawk was formerly placed in the large and diverse genus Accipiter. In 2024 a comprehensive molecular phylogenetic study of the Accipitridae confirmed earlier work that had shown that the genus was polyphyletic. To resolve the non-monophyly, Accipiter was divided into six genera. The genus Astur was resurrected to accommodate 9 species, including the bicolored hawk, that had previously been placed in Accipiter. The resurrected genus had been introduced in 1799 by the French naturalist Bernard Germain de Lacépède. The genus name is from Latin astur, asturis meaning "hawk".

The bicolored hawk is also closely related to the Cooper's hawk (A. cooperii) and Gundlach's hawk (A. gundlachi); these three form a superspecies. Until recently, the Chilean hawk (A. chilensis) from the colder, southernmost South America was treated as a race of A. bicolor but due to its differences in habitat preferences and plumages from the bicolored hawk, A. chilensis is now considered a full species.

Four subspecies are recognised:

- A. b. bicolor (Vieillot, 1817) – found in Southeastern Mexico and south through northern South America. Adults have a black crown, slate upper parts and a blackish tail that displays two or three pale bars. The primaries are obscurely barred.
- A. b. fidens (Bangs & Noble, 1918) – occurs in Eastern and Southern Mexico. It is morphologically similar to A. b. bicolor, but is larger in size and darker in color.
- A. b. guttifer (Hellmayr, 1917) – located in South Bolivia and northern Argentina. The underparts of the adult are grey or extensively salmon rufous with large white spots and bars.
- A. b. pileatus (Temminck, 1823) – living in Brazil. Adults are similar to A. b. bicolor, but are much paler and have a pearl-grey collar. Under-wing coverts and thighs are rufous.

== Description ==
At 34–45 centimetres (13–18 in) in length and 200–450 grams (7.1–15.9 oz) in weight, it is significantly smaller than the northern goshawk of Eurasia and North America, and somewhat smaller than the Cooper's hawk of North America, but it is among the largest hawks in Central and South America (only the rare grey-bellied hawk is larger). As in other hawks, the female is far larger than the male. Adults are grey above with darker wings and crown, and a banded tail. The underparts typically vary from dark grey to very pale grey, but the southern subspecies can sometimes be rufescent below. The thighs are always pure rufous (not always easily seen), and the underwing coverts are white in the northern subspecies and rufous in the southern. Juveniles are very variable. They can be white, buff or rufous below, and sometimes with dark streaks. Their upperparts are browner than in adults, and the thighs are sometimes paler.

== Distribution and habitat ==
The bicolored hawk is widespread but uncommonly observed. Its range extends from Mexico to west Ecuador, the Guianas to Colombia, south to east Peru, through Amazonian Brazil to Paraguay, north-northwestern Argentina, north of Uruguay, Bolivia and to Chile. It mainly resides in forest, along forest edges and in clearings in tropical and locally subtropical zones, although its habitat is none too specialized. It may also reside in rain forest, drier, thinned forest, and palm savanna with gallery forest.

Forest disturbance and fragmentation negatively affect the habitat and quantity of the bicolored hawk, which is most abundant in primary undisturbed forest or riparian forest. There are fewer hawks in disturbed habitats such as forests that have been logged, and even fewer in those fragmented habitats that provide greater than 66% forest cover. These hawks are rarely present in forests that provide less than 66% forest cover.

== Behaviour ==
The bicolored hawk is difficult to detect due to its shyness and inconspicuousness. Because of this behaviour, the bicolored hawk may be more common than it seems.

=== Vocalisations ===
Its vocalisations are mainly subdued and unnoticeable. Males have been heard to give a soft, clear whistle and females can emit a loud "cac cac cac" when around the nest and young. A barking "kra-kra-kra-kr-kr-kr-ka" may also be heard from both sexes. During incubation, males give a sharp "kek" vocalisation upon arrival to the nest with food, to which the female replies with a nasal "wreh".

=== Food and feeding ===
These hawks capture prey in a stealthy manner by flying through dense vegetation to ambush unsuspecting prey. They may also capture prey through aerial pursuit after inconspicuously sitting and watching their target. At times, the bicoloured hawk may hunt in pairs. Most commonly, it feeds on smaller birds such as thrushes, mockingbirds and small doves, but has also been known to consume small mammals, including bats, as well as reptiles and large insects. Southern race individuals (or females) are also known to take Chilean pigeons. Several instances where the hawks attack groups of squirrel monkeys or tamarins have been witnessed. In addition, these hawks may follow groups of monkeys in order to feed on the insects that are exposed by the monkeys.

=== Breeding ===
Bicolored hawks breed in forest areas, choosing to build nests on tree branches and occasionally hanging vines. The nest is built in cooperation between the male and female and is constructed from dried sticks and leaves. Each breeding pair will normally build a new nest at the beginning of each breeding year. Copulation occurs after breeding activities such as feeding and nest building have been completed. Egg laying takes place approximately five weeks after copulation and the dull white eggs measure an average of 47.1 mm × 36.5 mm; clutches average 1–3 eggs. The eggs are brooded for about three weeks by the female while the male forages for food. Bicolored hawk chicks are categorized as semi-altricial; the eyes are open at hatching but the chicks are not immediately mobile and are fed by the parents. The young fledge around 30–36 days after hatching and the fledgling period spans nearly seven weeks, during which the young will return to the nest frequently for food until they become independent.
