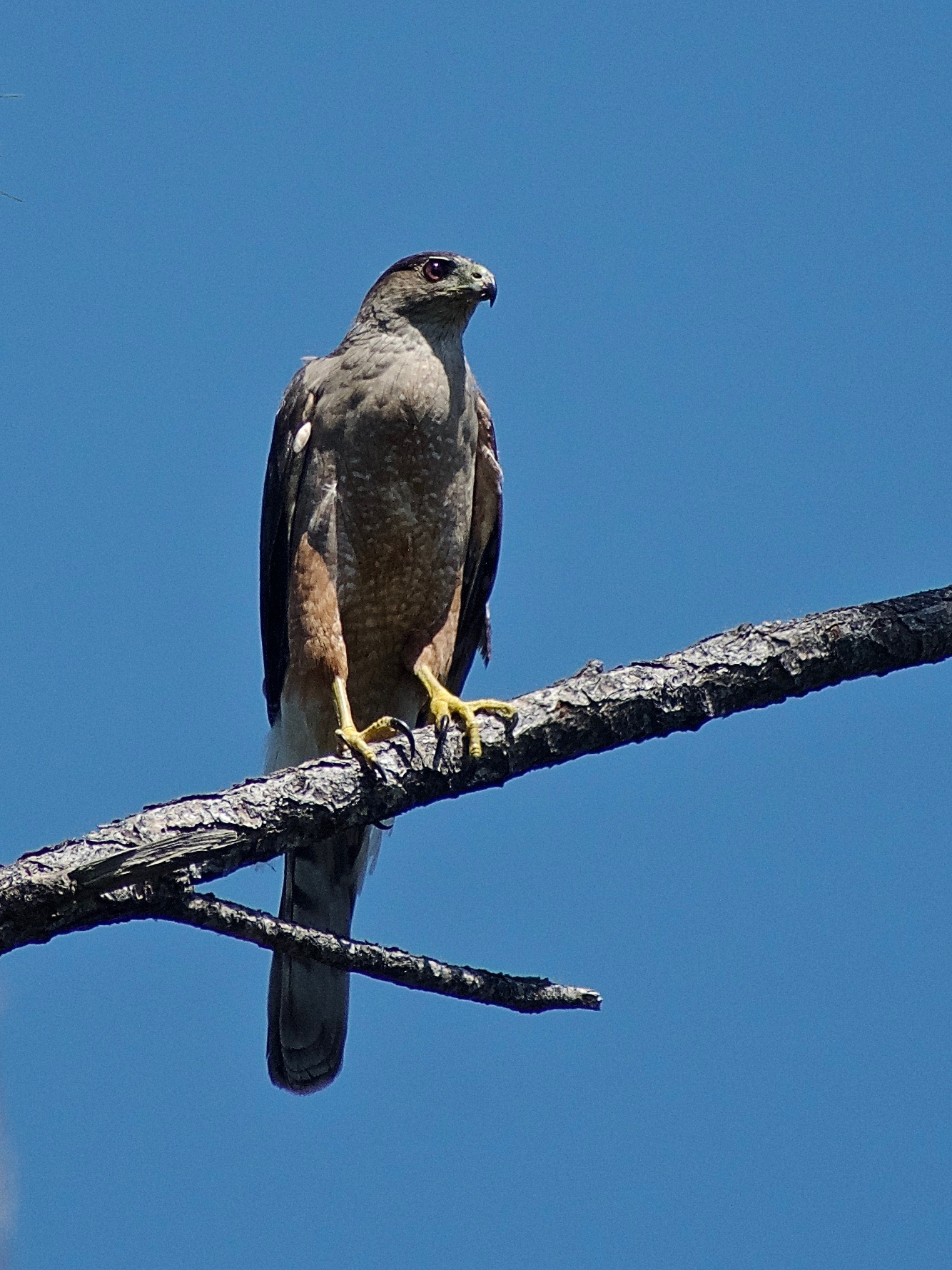
- A female Gundlach's hawk at UNESCO-listed Alexander Humboldt National Park in Baracoa, Eastern Cuba

Conservation status
- Endangered (IUCN 3.1)

Scientific classification
- Kingdom: Animalia
- Phylum: Chordata
- Class: Aves
- Order: Accipitriformes
- Family: Accipitridae
- Genus: Astur
- Species: A. gundlachi

Binomial name
- Astur gundlachi (Lawrence, 1860)

Subspecies
- A. g. gundlachi - (Lawrence, 1860); A. g. wileyi - (Wotzkow, 1991)

Synonyms
- Accipiter gundlachii Lawrence, 1860 [orth. error]

= Gundlach's hawk =

Species of bird

Gundlach's hawk (Astur gundlachi) is a species of bird of prey in the family Accipitridae. It was formerly placed in the genus Accipiter. It is one of 21 endemic bird species of Cuba. The common name and Latin binomial commemorate the German-Cuban ornithologist Juan Cristobal Gundlach (1810–1896). It is threatened by habitat loss and human persecution.

== Description ==
The hawk is a medium-sized forest raptor. It stands between 43–51 cm (17–20 in) in height and has a stocky body shape. The adult hawk has a dark bluish-gray upper body and wings, with a black head. The under body of the bird is a lighter color. It also has a striped tail that is rounded in flight. Immature hawks are mostly brown on the top and paler on the bottom, but with dark streaking down the body. Compared to some other raptors of the genus Astur such as the bicolored hawk and cooper's hawk, Gundlach's hawks are longer and faster.

=== Voice ===
Gundlach's hawks has two main calls the kek and the "squeal" which is usually associated with species of its type, Astur. The vocalizations for these calls are different for the sexes with variations in pitch, tempo and length. The male call is softer, clearer, and shallower with a higher peak compared to the female who makes most of the calls and whose call is at a softer pitch.

== Behavior ==
=== Breeding ===
Typically, Gundlach's hawk nests high up in trees in the forest, such as pines, at about an altitude of 19–25 metres (60–80 ft). Nesting high allows for hawks to prey on other birds that nest at much lower altitudes, along with the added benefit of protecting against nest predators. Nests are commonly made of smaller twigs from the trees that are found in the habitat.

=== Feeding ===
Gundlach's hawk feeds almost exclusively on birds. Because of the hawk's large feet, it can feed on the Cuban parrot, the Cuban parakeet, and the Cuban macaw (before its extinction). Other birds in its diet include doves and pigeons, quail, and chicken.

== Distribution and habitat ==
Gundlach's hawk is found only in Cuba. At one point it was common to find them throughout the country, however, now they can only be found in five isolated areas. The bulk of the population exists primarily on the eastern half of the island, in the two larger population centers, with the other three smaller populations on the west side of the island. They are able to live in a variety of habitats up 800 metres (2,600 ft). These include humid, dry, and pine forests. It does not have highly specialized habitat preferences needing only forests to conceal its hunting approaches Its natural habitats are dry forests and lowland moist forests. The species was never a common sight, but its population was dispersed throughout Cuba.

== Status and conservation ==
Gundlach's hawk has been classified as endangered since 1994, due to its small and fragmented population. The past five years however, has shown a stabilization in the hawk's population trends. Population totals in Cuba were estimated to be about 400, including 270 mature hawks. This may warrant Gundlach's hawks to be reclassified as vulnerable. The stabilization of the population may be attributed to conservation efforts bringing awareness to the hawk and its struggles. These conservation efforts include public campaigning of Gundlach's hawk, to improve education and awareness of the hawk and its environmental needs. Additional surveys of Cuba to assess current population and trends of Gundlach's hawk are required to determine the condition of the hawk in regards to extinction.

=== Threats ===
Gundlach's hawk faces a loss of habitat due to deforestation and logging in Cuba. It not only relies on trees for nesting but also for concealment as they prey on other birds. In addition to the loss of habitat the hawk also faces persecution from farmers because of its liking for poultry.
