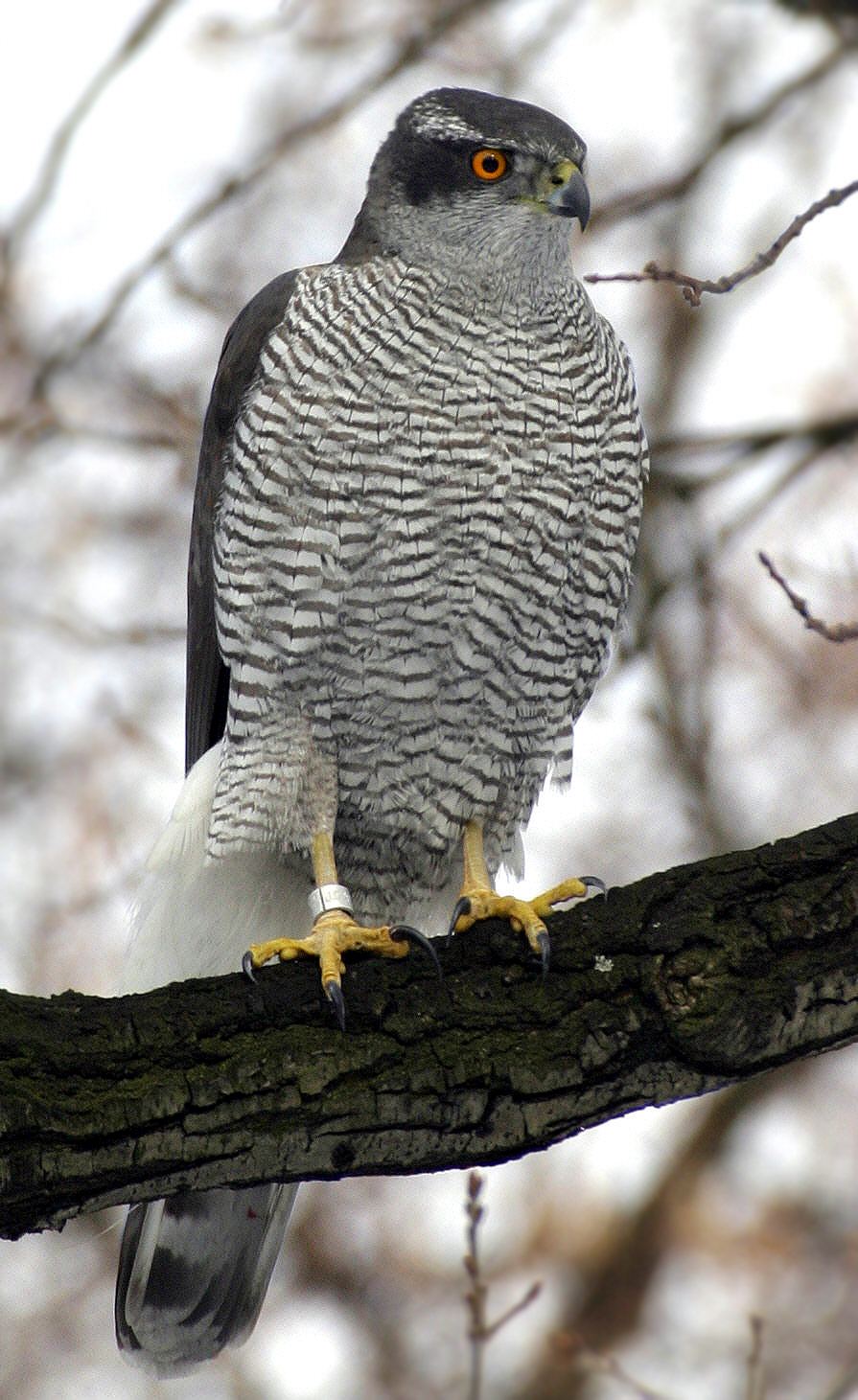
- Eurasian goshawk (Astur gentilis)

Scientific classification
- Kingdom: Animalia
- Phylum: Chordata
- Class: Aves
- Order: Accipitriformes
- Family: Accipitridae
- Subfamily: Accipitrinae
- Genus: Astur; Lacépède, 1799

Type species
- Falco gentilis Linnaeus, 1758

= Astur (bird) =

Genus of birds

Astur is a genus containing hawks, goshawks and sparrowhawks in the family Accipitridae. The species were formerly placed in the genus Accipiter.

== Taxonomy ==
The genus Astur was introduced in 1799 by the French naturalist Bernard Germain de Lacépède. The type species was later designated by the Irish zoologist Nicholas Vigors as Falco palumbarius Linnaeus, 1758, now considered as a junior synonym of Falco gentilis Linnaeus, 1758, the Eurasian goshawk. The name is from Latin astur, asturis meaning "hawk".

Species now placed in this genus were formerly assigned to the genus Accipiter. Molecular phylogenetic studies found that Accipiter was polyphyletic and in the subsequent rearrangement to create monophyletic genera, the genus Astur was resurrected in 2024 to contain nine species that were previously placed in Accipiter.

The genus contains nine species:

Genus Astur – Lacépède, 1799 – nine species
Common name	Scientific name and subspecies	Range	Size and ecology	IUCN status and estimated population
Cooper's hawk	Astur cooperii (Bonaparte, 1828)	southern Canada to Mexico	Size: Habitat: Diet:	LC
Gundlach's hawk	Astur gundlachi (Lawrence, 1860) Two subspecies: A. g. gundlachi - (Lawrence, 1860); A. g. wileyi - (Wotzkow, 1991)	Cuba.	Size: Habitat: Diet:	EN
Bicolored hawk	Astur bicolor (, ) Four subspecies: A. b. bicolor - (Vieillot, 1817); A. b. fidens - (Bangs & Noble, 1918); A. b. guttifer - (Hellmayr, 1917); A. b. pileatus - (Temminck, 1823)	Mexico to west Ecuador, the Guianas to Colombia, south to east Peru, through Amazonian Brazil to Paraguay, north-northwestern Argentina, north of Uruguay, Bolivia and to Chile	Size: Habitat: Diet:	LC
Chilean hawk	Astur chilensis (Philippi & Landbeck, 1864)	central Chile and western Argentina south to Tierra del Fuego,	Size: Habitat: Diet:	
Black sparrowhawk	Astur melanoleucus (Smith, A, 1830) Two subspecies: A. m. temminckii - Hartlaub, 1855; A. m. melanoleucus - (Smith, A, 1830)	coastal regions of South Africa, including the Cape Peninsula	Size: Habitat: Diet:	LC
Henst's goshawk	Astur henstii (Schlegel, 1873)	Madagascar	Size: Habitat: Diet:	VU
Eurasian goshawk	Astur gentilis (Linnaeus, 1758) Seven subspecies: A. g. albidus; A. g. arrigonii; A. g. buteoides; A. g. fujiyamae; A. g. gentilis; A. g. marginatus; A. g. schvedowi	western Europe (e.g. Great Britain, Spain, France)	Size: Habitat: Diet:	LC
American goshawk	Astur atricapillus (Wilson, A, 1812) Three subspecies: A. a. apache; A. a. atricapillus; A. a. laingi	western United States, including Alaska, and western Canada.	Size: Habitat: Diet:	LC
Meyer's goshawk	Astur meyerianus (Sharpe, 1878)	Moluccas, New Guinea, the Bismarck Archipelago and the Solomon Islands.	Size: Habitat: Diet:	LC
