= Ñuble National Reserve =

Chilean national reserve

- IUCN category IV (habitat/species management area)
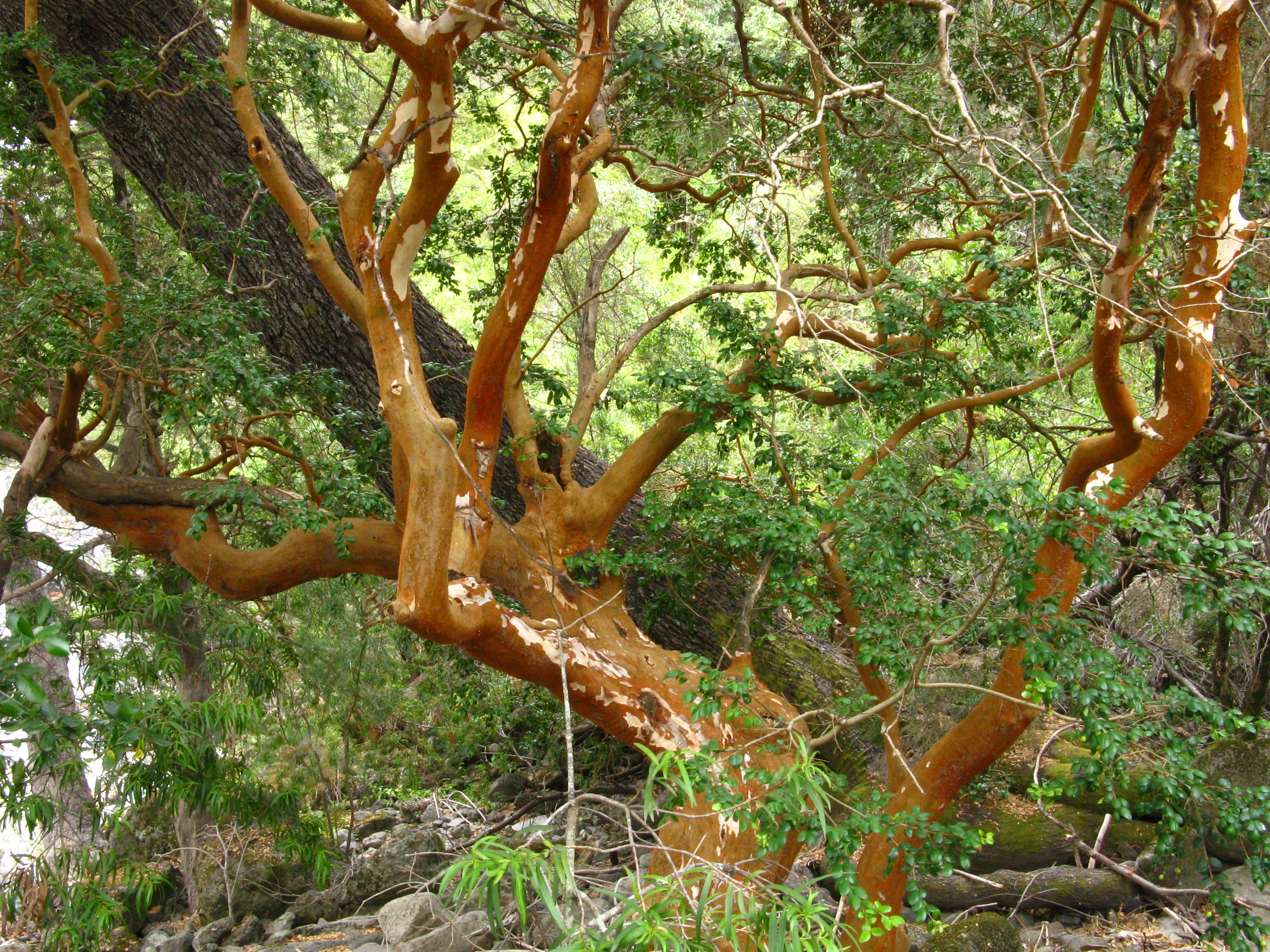
- Arrayan rojo (Luma apiculata) in Ñuble National Reserve
- Interactive map of Ñuble National Reserve
- Location: Ñuble and Biobío regions, Chile
- Area: 559.48 km^{2} (216.02 sq mi)
- Designation: National reserve
- Designated: 1979
- Governing body: Corporación Nacional Forestal (CONAF)

Ñuble National Reserve is a national reserve of Chile located in the Andes of Ñuble and Biobío regions.

== Location ==
The Ñuble National Reserve is located between the southern border of the Pinto commune, Diguillín province in the Ñuble Region, and the northern border of the Antuco commune, Biobío province, in the Biobío Region. It was created on November 24, 1978.

== Attractions ==
The reserve has 12% of Chile's plant diversity, including forests of lenga, ñirre, lleuque, and mountain cypress. In terms of fauna, there are huemul and puma, in addition to 14% of the bird species described for Chile.

== Access ==
On the paved road to the Chillán hot springs, at km 57 take the detour to the right, called "el corte".
