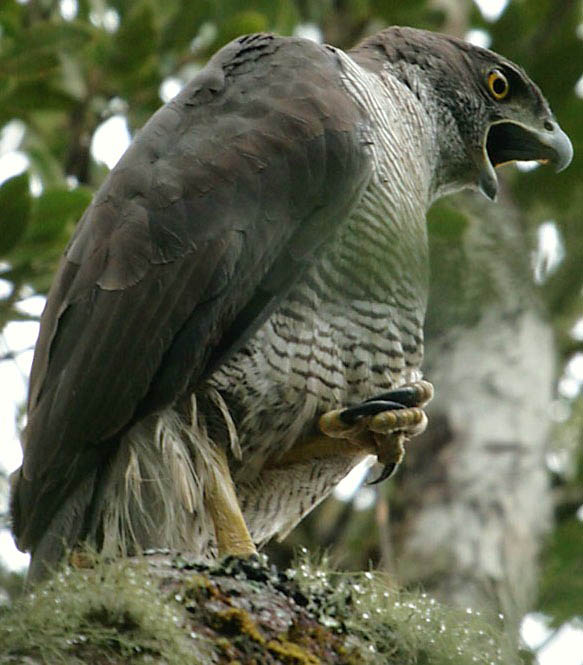

Conservation status
- Vulnerable (IUCN 3.1)

Scientific classification
- Kingdom: Animalia
- Phylum: Chordata
- Class: Aves
- Order: Accipitriformes
- Family: Accipitridae
- Genus: Astur
- Species: A. henstii

Binomial name
- Astur henstii Schlegel, 1873

= Henst's goshawk =

Species of bird

Henst's goshawk (Astur henstii) is a species of bird of prey in the family Accipitridae. It was formerly placed in the genus Accipiter. It is a large, diurnal bird endemic to the island of Madagascar. It is an obligate forest species that occurs at very low densities on the island and is rarely seen. It can only occupy the primary and secondary forests found within the island. Its natural habitats are subtropical or tropical dry forest, subtropical or tropical moist lowland forest, subtropical or tropical moist montane forest, and plantations. It is threatened by habitat loss within Madagascar.

== Description ==
Henst's goshawk is a large forest raptor with a body length of 52 to 62 cm (20 to 24 in). The wingspan is between 86 and 100 cm (34 and 39 in). There is a notable size discrepancy between males and females, with males weighing 609 g (1.343 lb) on average and the larger females weighing 960 to 1,140 g (2.12 to 2.51 lb) on average. It is one of the world's largest hawks, rivaling the Eurasian goshawk and Meyer's goshawk.

The body is mostly covered in a dark brownish-grey plumage that is quite indistinct while the underparts are lighter in colouration and have a barred pattern. Juvenile colouration will vary and can be distinguished by having large brown spots on the breast and belly. A strong distinguishing feature is a pale eye line on the contrasting dark head. The eyes and long legs of the species are yellow in colour.

In flight, Henst's goshawk will have its rounded wings and long, barred tail on display. Moreover, the pale coloured rump may be used to aid in identification of a flying individual.

=== Mimic ===
Henst's goshawk may be easily confused with an apparent mimic species also present in Madagascar, the Madagascar serpent eagle (Eutriorchis astur). These species may be distinguished using a few key features. The first is size: Henst's goshawk is a much larger bird. The barred pattern present on the breast of Henst's goshawk is also more distinct than that of the Madagascar serpent eagle, which will have a more muted pattern with lighter coloration.

== Taxonomy ==
Henst's goshawk is a species within the genus Astur. This group of birds mostly consists of goshawks and sparrowhawks. They lack a procoracoid foramen (a hole at the base of procoracoid bone). This genus is within the family Accipitridae and order Accipitriformes which together make up the majority of the diurnal birds of prey.

The species was first described by Hermann Schlegel, a German ornithologist (who had a position at the Rijksmuseum van Natuurlijke Historie in Leiden, The Netherlands), in 1873.

There are two other Accipiter sensu lato present on the island of Madagascar: Frances's sparrowhawk (Tachyspiza francesiae) and Madagascar sparrowhawk (Accipiter madagascariensis), both of which are smaller than Henst's goshawks.

== Distribution and habitat ==
Henst's goshawk has a limited distribution within Madagascar due to specific habitat requirements. The preferred habitats of Henst's goshawk are primary rainforests and occasionally secondary woodland. Due to the physical geography of Madagascar these areas are restricted to the North, West and East of the island and do not occur within the southern portion. The southern portion of the island contains more arid and dry forests not suitable for raptor foraging. Consequently, the distribution of Henst's goshawk follows that of its preferred forest habitat and is not found in the southern portion of the island. The primary forests of Madagascar may be categorized as dry deciduous and humid evergreen, both of which are occupied by Henst's goshawk.

It is known as an obligate forest species meaning it relies on forested habitat. This poses a problem, since these habitats are quickly being lost due to development in the region. However, it has been spotted within Eucalyptus plantations in the region. And may use these plantations to supplement for lost habitat.

Within this range, it is known to be a rare species that occurs at low densities, but present within all non-arid forests. The estimated range of occurrence is approximately 673000 km2. With a vertical range of occurrence ranging from sea level to 1800m above sea level. As a top predator, large area requirements are necessary for foraging, explaining why the species occurs at low densities.

== Behaviour ==
The goshawk will mainly hunt from a hidden perch within the forest and will rarely soar above the canopy cover.

=== Reproduction ===
Henst's goshawk will form breeding pairs that are known as "socially monogamous". Therefore, breeding pairs may seem like monogamous pairs but only do so for chick rearing, and will actively seek extra pair copulations on the side. Little is known about the courtship process of Henst's other than a "switchbacking" display observed by Safford and Duckworth. These displays constitute hairpin turns and aerial displays followed by a distinct breeding vocalization. Following copulation, egg-laying takes place in October–November. A preference has been noted for nest sites to occur in high stature forests near a water course.

Both adults take part in constructing large, bulky nests within the main fork of trees. These nests may also be built within the aforementioned Eucalyptus plantations present on the island.The only observed clutch size has been 2 eggs with the measurements of 57.0 x 41.2 and 60.0 x 42.7 mm.

Henst's appear to exhibit some sort of site fidelity, where the previous year's nest is re-used or another one is built only a couple of hundred meters away from the original. Site fidelity is most likely explained by the specificity of preferred nest habitat to occur in old growth forests near water.

==== Nest predation ====
Although known as a climax predator within Madagascan rainforests, nest-predation has been observed within multiple Henst's goshawk populations. Following gestation, the female Goshawk will leave the nest unattended for long periods of time, while males only feed the chicks sporadically, leaving the nest vulnerable to predation events at the hands of Harrier-hawks, whereby chicks within unattended nests were quickly killed and consumed by a circling harrier-hawk on multiple occasions.

=== Diet ===
Henst's goshawk is an adept forest predator whose diet mainly consists of medium to large sized birds and mammals. With powerful eyesight, large curved talons and a curved raptor beak it is an extremely adept predatory animal. Hunting occurs from a discrete tree perch or from low forest floor flight. Henst's goshawk will not leave the canopy cover while foraging.

The preferred prey are lemurs and poultry that occur within primary forest habitat. The ability to hunt lemurs makes Henst's goshawk an important part of the Madagascan food web. Henst's also does not exhibit a species preference and will hunt a large range of lemurs as well, ranging from 100g to 4 kg. Thereby Henst's plays an important role in maintaining population health in Lemurs by reducing the abundance of diseased and old individuals, keeping the population healthy.

=== Vocalizations ===
The basic call is a loud, crackling and rapid "ang-ang-ang-ang...". These vocalizations can be heard crackling through the canopy when in flight. However, these calls are rarely heard as Henst's is a more secretive species.

Except for the breeding season, when Henst's goshawk can be very loud and vocal. They will utter a rapid succession of "keey-keey-keey' in order to communicate with potential breeding partners.

== Conservation ==
An assessment by Birdlife International in 2016 has placed Henst's goshawk as Vulnerable on the IUCN Red List. The justification for this conservation status is the relatively small population size estimated at 1,000–2,250 individuals. With that population, the number of breeding adults is estimated to be 670–1,500 individuals. This population is estimated to be decreasing due to deforestation and human disturbance.

The species is quite sparse and elusive to most surveys and therefore accurate population measures are difficult to obtain. A more thorough investigation of the population is declined and most likely will lead to a higher threat category.

Henst's goshawk occurs in several protected areas within Madagascar such as the Ranomafana National Park and the Tsingy de Bemaraha Strict Nature Reserve. The Madagascan Government has pledged to further protect the island's unique biodiversity.
