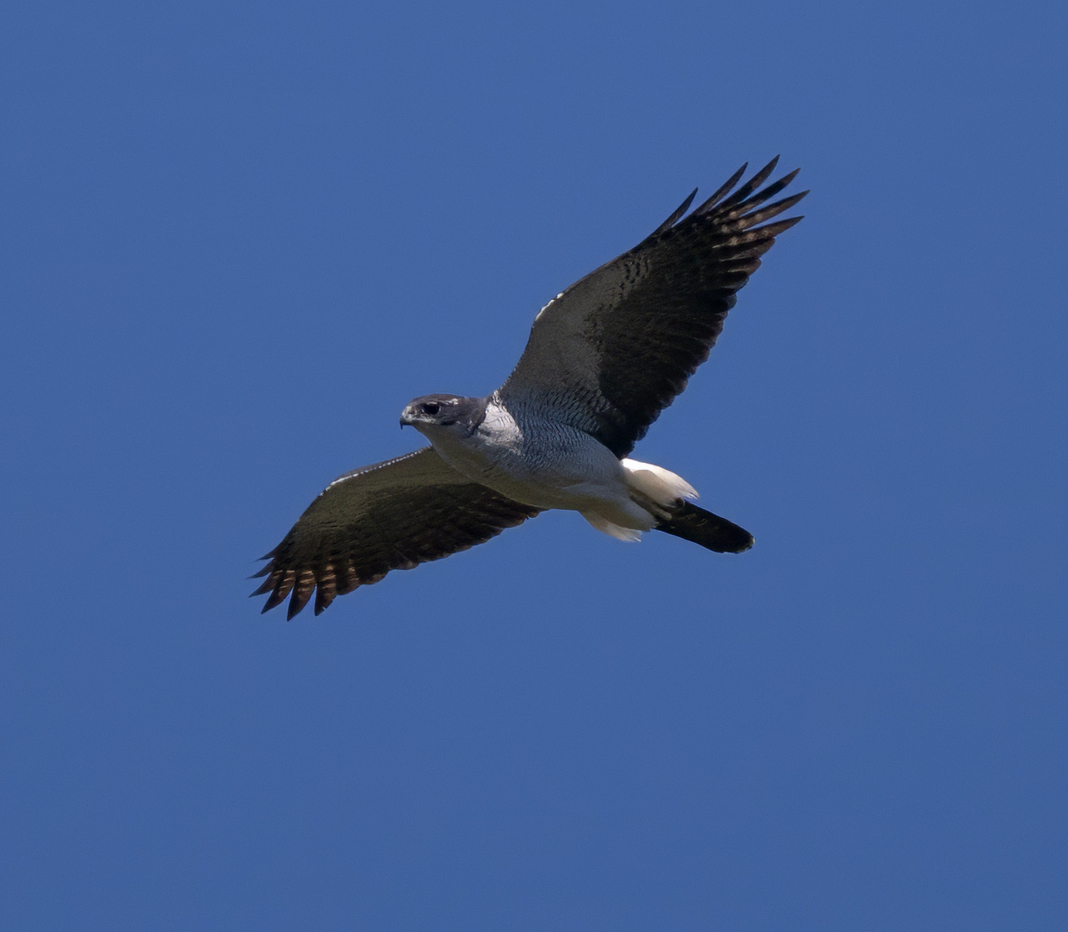

Conservation status
- Least Concern (IUCN 3.1)

Scientific classification
- Kingdom: Animalia
- Phylum: Chordata
- Class: Aves
- Order: Accipitriformes
- Family: Accipitridae
- Genus: Astur
- Species: A. meyerianus

Binomial name
- Astur meyerianus Sharpe, 1878

Synonyms
- Accipiter meyerianus

= Meyer's goshawk =

Species of bird

Meyer's goshawk (Astur meyerianus) is a species of bird of prey in the family Accipitridae. It is found in the Moluccas, New Guinea, the Bismarck Archipelago and the Solomon Islands. Its natural habitats are subtropical or tropical moist lowland forest and subtropical or tropical moist montane forest. This species was formerly placed in the genus Accipiter.

The common name commemorates Adolf Bernard Meyer (1840–1911), a German anthropologist and ornithologist who collected in the Dutch East Indies.

== Description ==
It has a length of 43 to 53 cm and a wingspan of 86 to 105 cm. One male and female weighed 530 and 1,100 grams, respectively.
