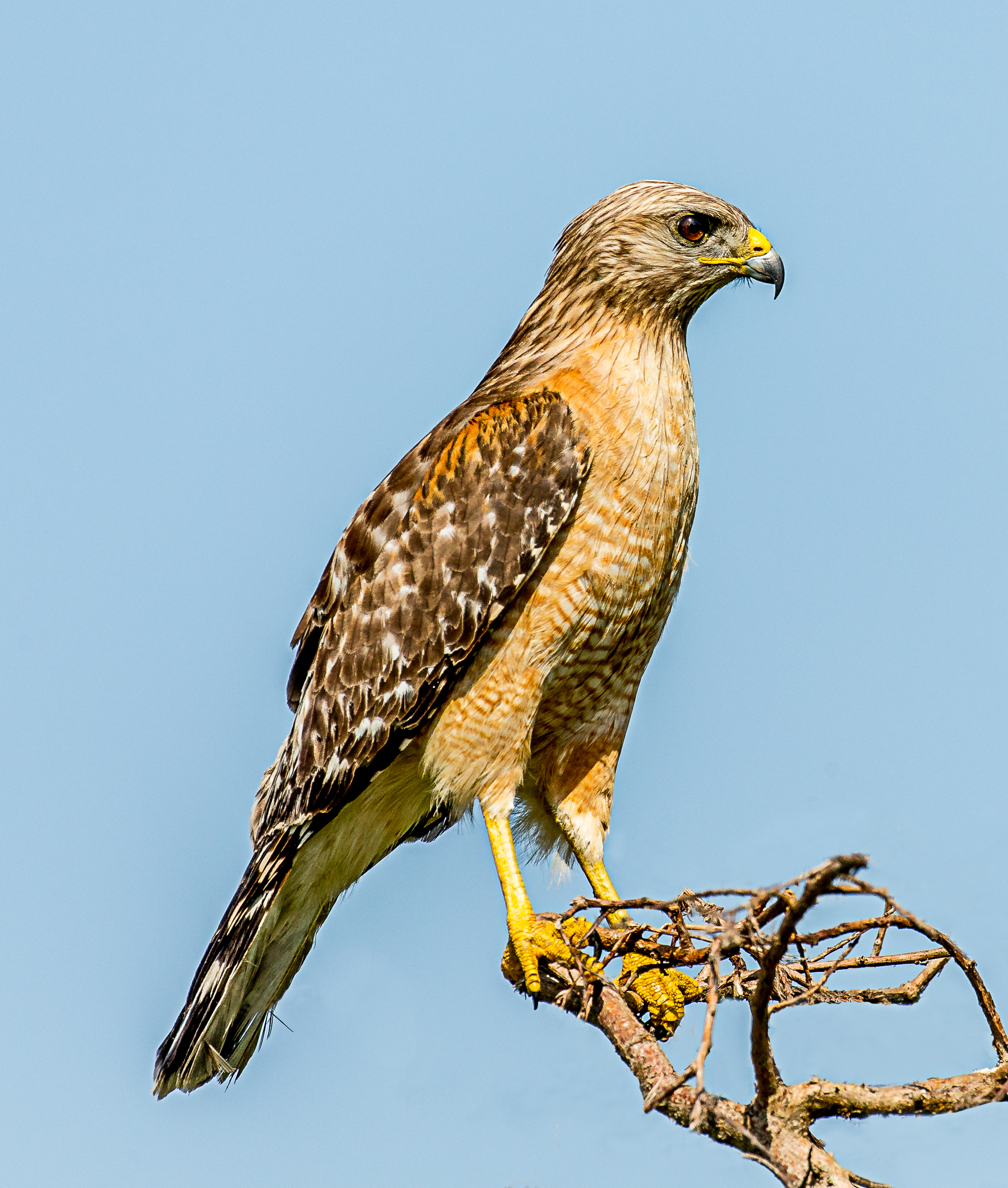
- A red-shouldered hawk near Blue Cypress Lake, Florida

Conservation status
- Least Concern (IUCN 3.1)

Scientific classification
- Kingdom: Animalia
- Phylum: Chordata
- Class: Aves
- Order: Accipitriformes
- Family: Accipitridae
- Genus: Buteo
- Species: B. lineatus

Binomial name
- Buteo lineatus (Gmelin, 1788)
- Range of B. lineatus Breeding range Year-round range Wintering range

= Red-shouldered hawk =

Red-shouldered hawk Temporal range: Pleistocene (Middle Pleistocene) – Holocene (Recent) 0.13–0 Ma

Species of bird

The red-shouldered hawk (Buteo lineatus) is a medium-sized buteo. Its breeding range spans eastern North America, along the coast of California and northern to northeastern-central Mexico. It is a permanent resident throughout most of its range, though northern birds do migrate, mostly to central Mexico. The main conservation threat to the widespread species is deforestation.

== Taxonomy ==
The red-shouldered hawk was formally described in 1788 by the German naturalist Johann Friedrich Gmelin in his revised and expanded edition of Carl Linnaeus's Systema Naturae. He placed it with the eagles, hawks and relatives in the genus Falco and coined the binomial name Falco lineatus. Gmelin based his account on the "barred-breasted buzzard" of John Latham and the "red shouldered falcon" of Thomas Pennant. Latham had described a preserved specimen from North America in the Leverian collection while Pennant's specimen formed part of the collection of Anna Blackburne and had come from Long Island. The red-shouldered hawk is now placed with 27 other species in the genus Buteo that was introduced in 1799 by Bernard Germain de Lacépède.

The genus name Buteo is Latin for a "buzzard". The specific epithet lineatus is Latin meaning "marked with lines" or "lined".

=== Subspecies ===
Five subspecies are recognised:

- B. l. lineatus (Gmelin, 1788) – east North America
- B. l. alleni Ridgway, 1885 – central south Texas to North Carolina and north Florida (USA)
- B. l. extimus Bangs, 1920 – south Florida and the Florida Keys (USA)
- B. l. texanus Bishop, 1912 – south Texas (USA) to southeast Mexico
- B. l. elegans Cassin, 1855 – south Oregon (USA) to Baja California (Mexico)

== Description ==
Males are 38 to 58 cm (15 to 23 in) long and weigh on average 550 g (1.21 lb). Females are slightly larger at 47 to 61 cm (19 to 24 in) in length and a mean weight of 700 g (1.5 lb). The wingspan can range from 90 to 127 cm (35 to 50 in). Adult birds can vary in mass from 460 to 930 g (1.01 to 2.05 lb). Among standard measurements, the wing bone is 28–35 cm (11–14 in) long, the tail is 16–24 cm (6.3–9.4 in) long and the tarsus is 7.5–9 cm (3.0–3.5 in).

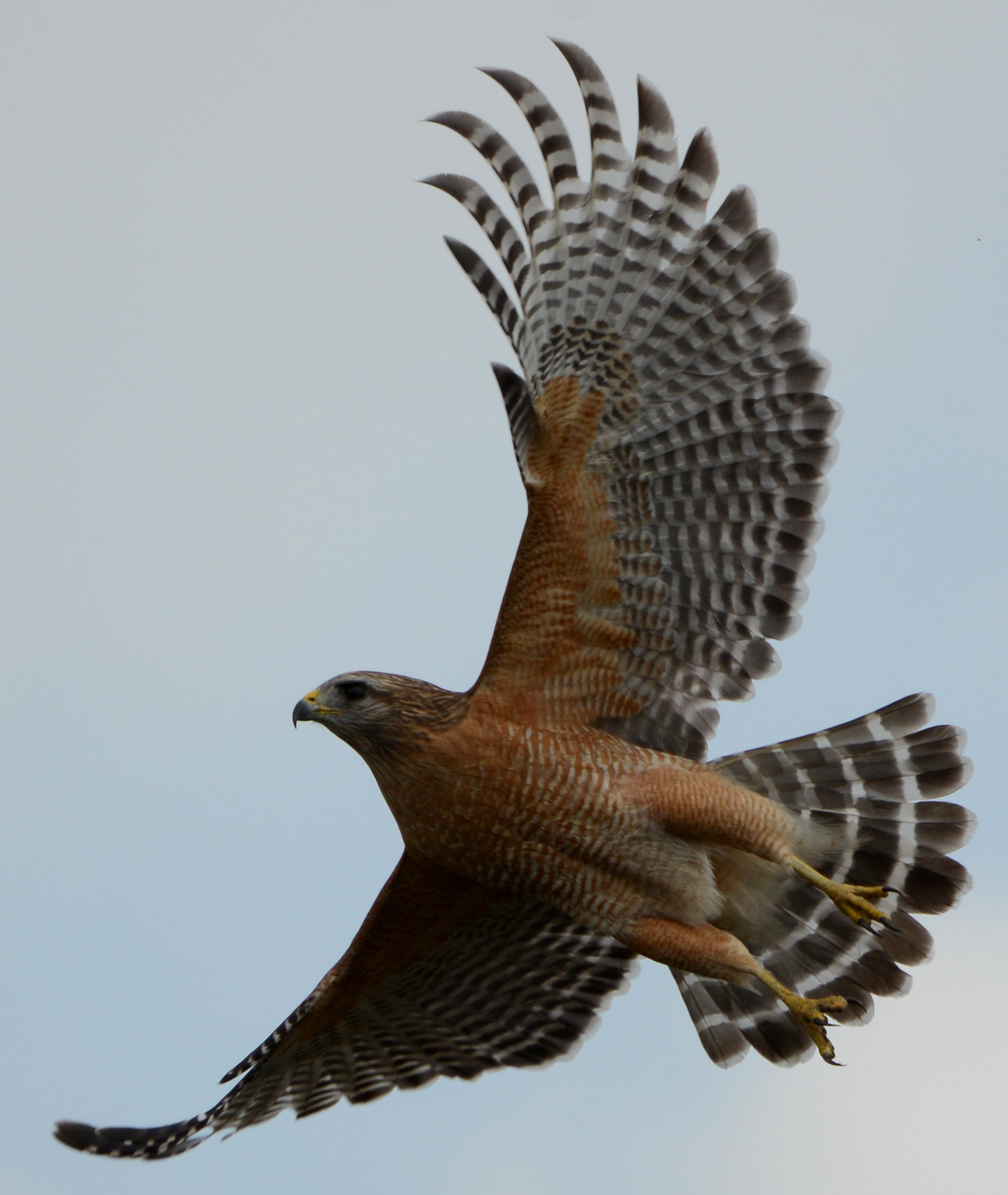
Red-shouldered hawk taking flight at Green Cay Wetlands, Florida

Adults have brownish heads, reddish chests, and pale bellies with reddish bars. Their tails, which are quite long by Buteo standards, are marked with narrow white bars. Red "shoulders" are visible when the birds are perched. These hawks' upper parts are dark with pale spots and they have long yellow legs. Western birds may appear more red, while Florida birds are generally paler. The wings of adults are more heavily barred on the upper side. Juvenile red-shouldered hawks are most likely to be confused with juvenile broad-winged hawks, but can be distinguished by their long tails, crescent-like wing markings, and a more flapping, Accipiter-like flight style. In direct comparison, it is typically larger and longer proportioned than the broad-wing, though is slightly smaller and more slender than most other common North American Buteo species. This bird is sometimes also confused with the widespread red-tailed hawk. That species is larger and bulkier, with more even-sized, broad wings, and is paler underneath, with a reddish tail often apparent. The red-tail is also more likely to soar steadily, with wings in a slight dihedral.

== Distribution and habitat ==
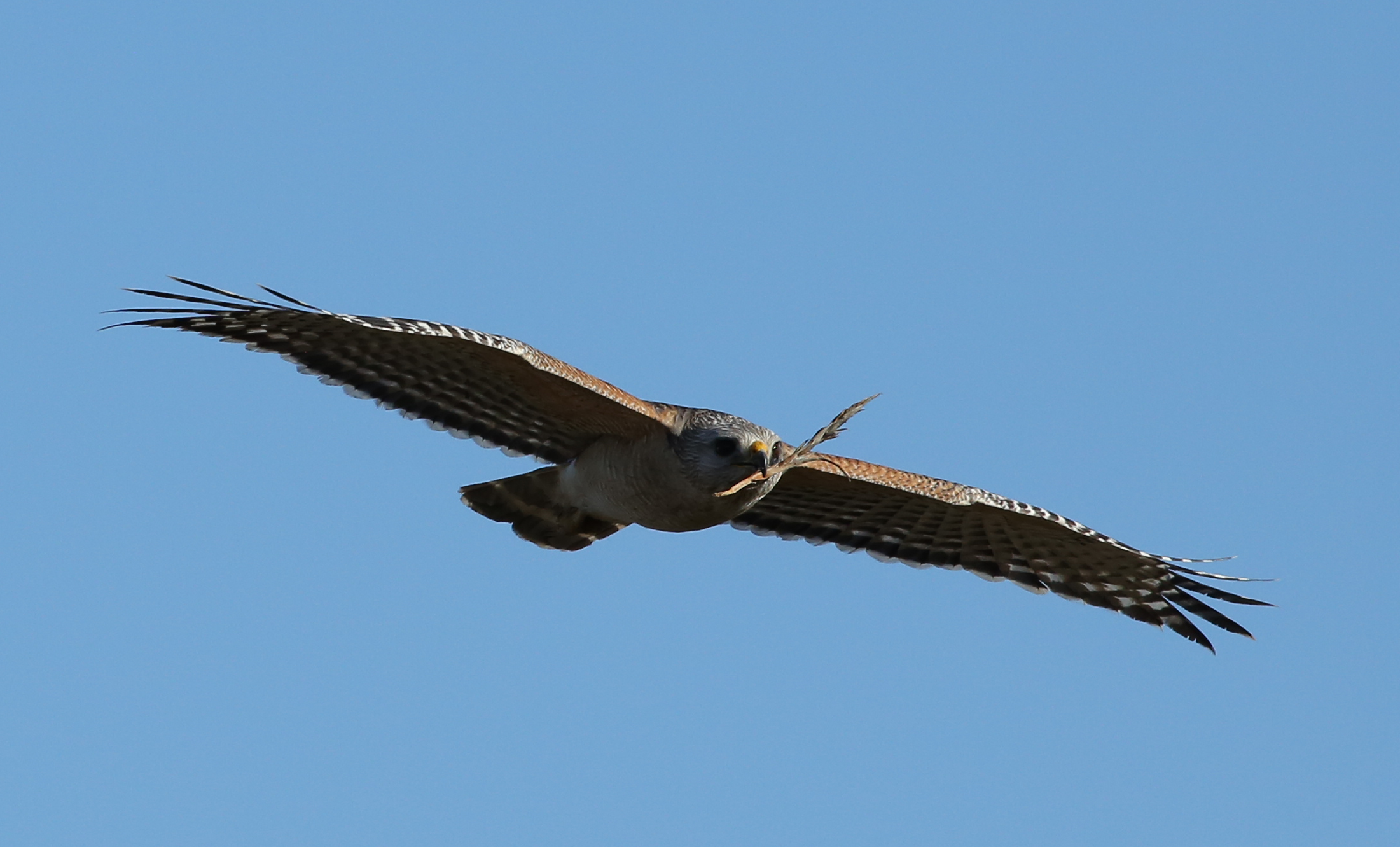
In Everglades National Park.

An eastern population ranges west through southern Canada from southern New Brunswick and Ontario to the eastern edge of the U.S. Great Plains, south to Florida, the Gulf Coast, and eastern Mexico. Only northernmost populations are migratory. A western population breeds west of the Sierra Nevada from northern California to northern Baja California, and has recently expanded into Oregon and Arizona, and east of the Sierra Nevada in California and southern Nevada.

Eastern populations winter from southern Wisconsin, Oklahoma, Ohio, and southern New England south to the Gulf Coast, occasionally throughout breeding range. In winter, they are reported south to Jalisco and Veracruz, Mexico. Western populations are largely nonmigratory. Throughout its winter range, this species avoids higher elevations.

Eastern birds occasionally wander west (e.g., Colorado, Kansas, West Texas, Manitoba, North Dakota) in migration; western birds have strayed east to Arizona, Nevada, Idaho, and Utah, and north to Washington.

In the east, individuals from the northern half of the species' range are migratory. In the west, most populations are local. Red-shouldered hawks are short- to moderate-distance migrants, with most individuals traveling distances between 300 and 1,500 km each way. The species follows leading lines, migrating along inland ridges and coastlines. Larger numbers of red-shouldered hawks are counted at coastal watch sites than at inland sites. Juveniles often precede adults on migration in autumn, whereas adults precede juveniles in the spring. Red-shouldered hawks typically migrate alone, although they sometimes form small flocks of three or more birds. The species usually avoids crossing large bodies of water. While migrating, red-shouldered hawks are observed in soaring, gliding, and flapping flight.

A study of red-shouldered hawk home range and habitat use in southern California found average home range of 1.2 square kilometres (0.46 sq mi) and showed fair adaptability to human-altered landscapes, which is important as riparian forest habitat has diminished by 98% from 1850 to 1977 in California's Central Valley.

Red-shouldered hawks are forest raptors. In the east, they live in bottomland hardwood stands, flooded deciduous swamps, and upland mixed deciduous–conifer forests. They tend to live in stands with an open subcanopy, which makes hunting easier. They are not exclusively birds of deep forest, though; one can find red-shouldered hawks in some suburban areas where houses or other buildings are mixed into woodlands. In the west, they live in riparian and oak woodlands, and also in eucalyptus groves and some residential areas.

== Behavior ==
Red-shouldered hawk
Woodbridge, Connecticut, April 2002. By Tony Phillips.

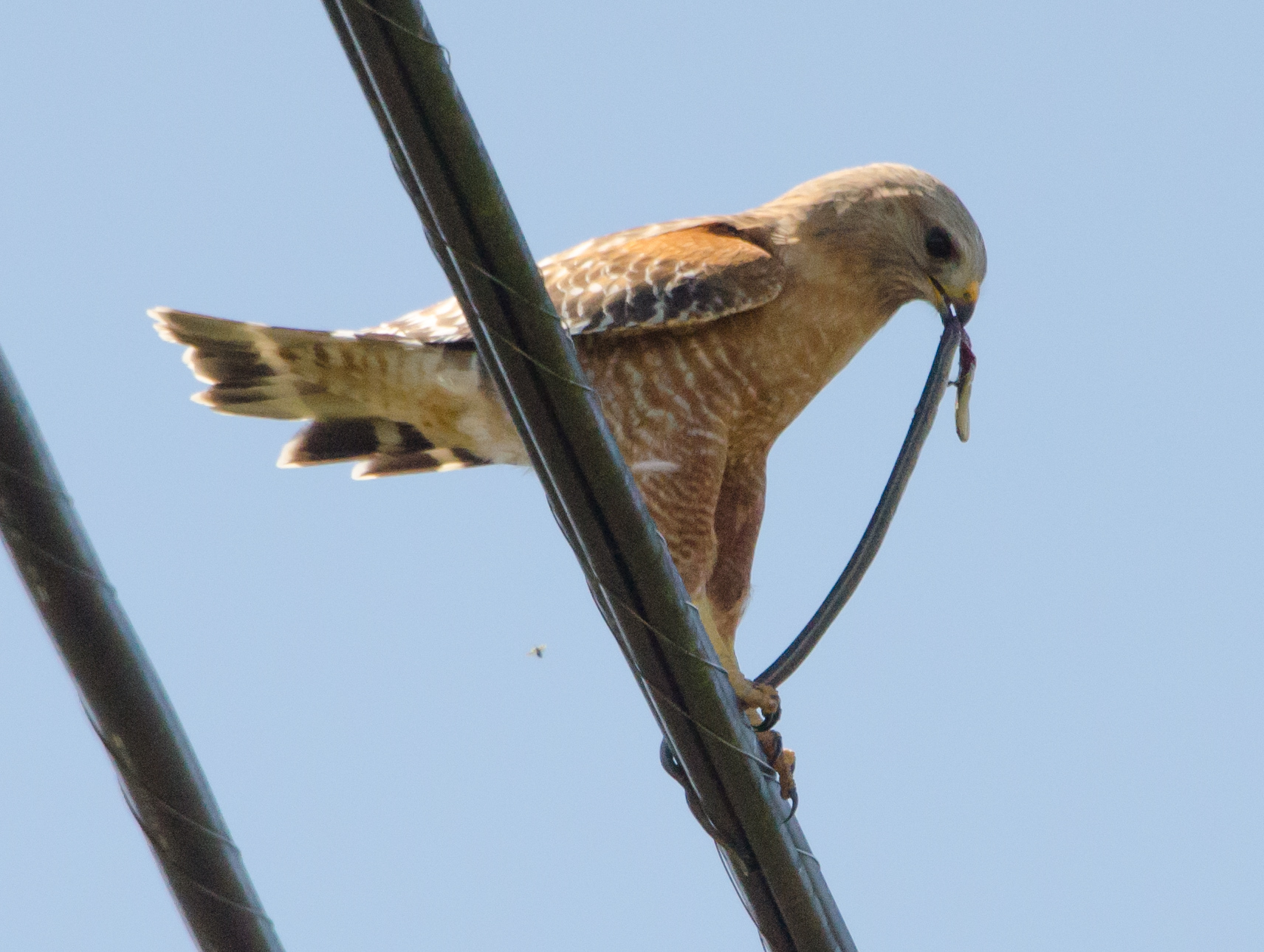
Eating a garter snake

=== Food and feeding ===
Red-shouldered hawks search for prey while perched on a treetop or soaring over woodlands. When they sight prey, they kill it by dropping directly onto it from the air. They may cache food near their nest for later consumption. When in clearings, they sometimes fly high and then drop to surprise prey. Red-shouldered hawks, like most raptors, have very good vision and reasonably good sense of hearing, with talons capable of killing animals as big as their own size. Small mammals are typically the most common prey, especially rodents. Voles, gophers, mice, moles and chipmunks may locally be favored based on abundance. Slightly larger mammals, such as rabbits and tree squirrels, are also occasionally preyed on. Other prey can include amphibians, reptiles (especially small snakes), birds, fish, and large insects. They will attack birds up to the size of a ruffed grouse or ring-necked pheasant. Steller's jays and blue jays, both of which being potential prey species, sometimes habitually imitate the call of the red-shouldered hawk and are known to be difficult to distinguish on voice alone. During winters, red-shouldered hawks sometimes habituate to preying on birds commonly found at bird feeders. In some areas where they are common, crayfish can be important prey for this species. Unusual food items recorded for the species have included nocturnal animals such as eastern screech owls and flying squirrels and road-killed deer.

=== Breeding ===
Female (top) and male (bottom), 1826 painting by John James Audubon

The breeding habitats of the red-shouldered hawk are deciduous and mixed wooded areas, often near water. They have been known to nest near residential areas and open water but this is much less common. Red-shouldered hawks select sites with greater tree species richness for nesting. Like almost all raptors, the red-shouldered hawk is monogamous and territorial. While courting or defending territories, the distinctive, screaming kee-aah call (usually repeated three to four times) of this bird is heard. Courtship displays occur on the breeding grounds, and involve soaring together in broad circles while calling, or soaring and diving toward one another. Males may also perform the "sky-dance" by soaring high in the air, and then making a series of steep dives, each followed by a wide spiral and rapid ascent. These courtship flights usually occur in late morning and early afternoon.

Red-shouldered hawks' mating season is between April and July, with activity usually peaking between April and mid-June. The breeding pair builds a stick nest (sometimes including shredded bark, leaves and green sprigs) in a major fork of a large tree. They often use the same nest year after year, refurbishing it annually with sticks in the spring. The clutch size is typically three to four eggs. The blotchy-marked eggs, often brown to lavender in color, measure on average 54.5 mm × 43 mm (2.15 in × 1.69 in). The incubation period can range from 28 to 33 days. Hatching is asynchronous, with the first chick hatching up to a week before the last. The hatchlings, which weigh 35 g (1.2 oz) at first, are brooded almost constantly by the female for up to 40 days. Pairs that nest earlier in the breeding season tend to lay greater numbers of eggs and have higher productivity from those eggs. The male more often captures food but will also incubate and brood occasionally. The young leave the nest at about six weeks of age, but remain dependent on the parents until they are 17 to 19 weeks old. They may continue to roost near the nest site until the following breeding season. Breeding maturity is usually attained at 1 or 2 years of age.

==== Mortality ====
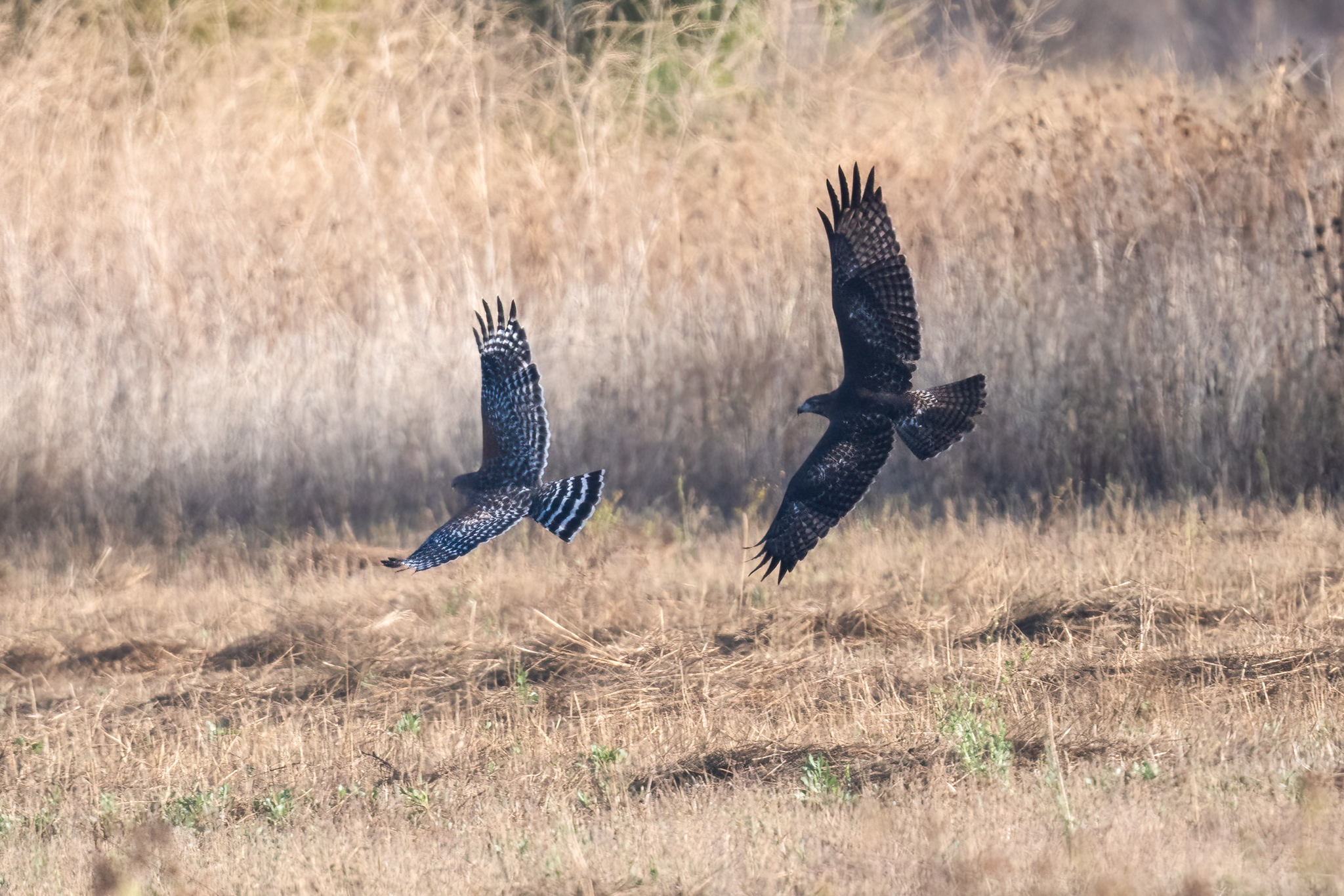
Chased by a red-tailed hawk, in California

Although they have lived as long as within a month of 20 years old, few live half that long and only around half survive their first year. Each year overall nesting success can be lower than 30 percent. Early mortality can be due to natural causes, relating to harsh weather conditions, or more often starvation. Young hawks are often parasitized by species such as Trichomonas gallinae, Protocalliphora avium, and various species of blood parasites. Humans, intentionally or unintentionally, are a threat to red-shouldered hawks, including hunting, collision with electric wires, road accidents and logging. A further common cause of mortality is natural predation. Raccoons, martens, fishers and large arboreal snakes can prey on eggs, hatchlings, fledglings and occasionally incubating and brooding adults. Non-nesting adults, being a fairly large and powerful predator, have fewer natural predators, but (both during and after the breeding season, as well as among nestlings) they may be preyed on by other red-shouldered hawks, great horned owls, red-tailed hawks, barred owls, american goshawks, peregrine falcons, prairie falcons, and bald and golden eagles. In western New York, the main cause of nest failure was stated to be great horned owl predation. Many of the same predators sometimes compete over territory and food with this species. Despite their highly similar diet and habitat preferences, it has been found that red-shouldered hawks can nest within 48 m (157 ft) of a barred owl without interspecies conflict. In Florida, red-shouldered hawks sometimes collaborate and peaceably coexist with American crows (usually an enemy to all other birds because of their egg-hunting habits) so they cooperatively mob mutual predators, mainly great horned owls and red-tailed hawks.

Red-shouldered hawks have hybridized with gray hawks (Buteo plagiatus), red-tailed hawks (Buteo jamaicensis) and common black hawks (Buteogallus anthracinus).

== Status ==
Prior to 1900, the red-shouldered hawk was one of the most common North American raptors. Population densities have decreased precipitously due to the clearing of mature forests (principally the wet hardwood forest they prefer) since that time. The changing of habitats has led to a general population increase of the red-tailed hawk, an occasional predator of its cousin. Additionally affecting the red-shouldered hawk was the greater availability of firearms in the early 1900s, leading to unchecked hunting of this and all other raptor species until conservation laws took effect in the latter half of the 20th century. Local forest regrowth and the ban of hunting has allowed red-shouldered hawk populations to become more stable again and the species is not currently considered conservation dependent. In Florida, the red-shouldered hawk is perhaps the most commonly seen and heard raptor species (outside of abundant black and turkey vultures). However, human activity, including logging, poisoning from insecticides and industrial pollutants, continue to loom as threats to the species. Before its use was outlawed in the United States, red-shouldered hawks and other raptors suffered from exposure to DDT, a pesticide. The DDT would cause their eggs to have thin, breakable shells, reducing their ability to reproduce. Accidental encounters with power lines and automobiles also take a toll on hawks. In spite of these dangers, habitat loss remains the biggest threat to red-shouldered hawks.

== In art ==
John James Audubon illustrated the red-shouldered hawk in his book Ornithological Biographies.

== Gallery ==
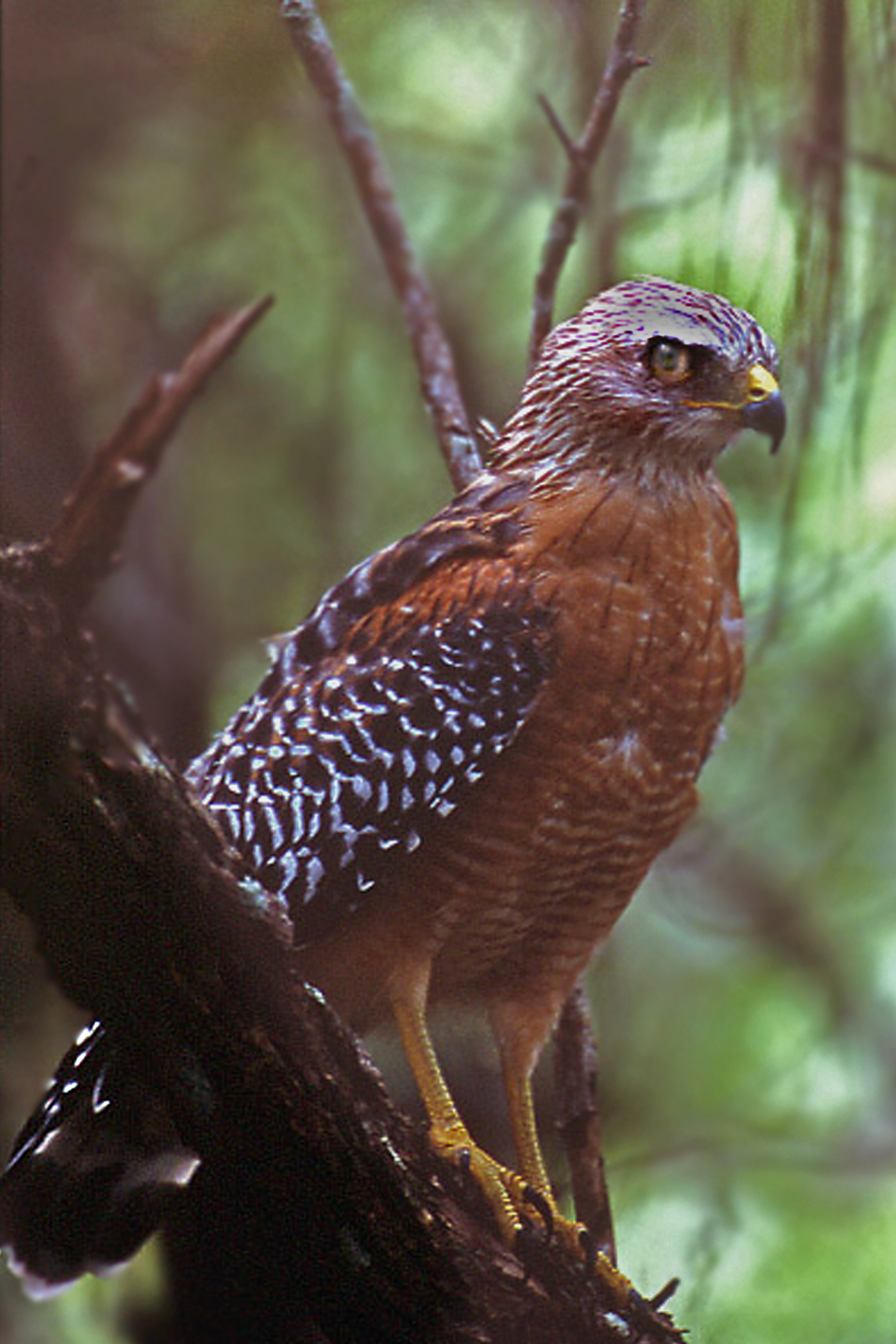
Lighthouse Beach Park, Sanibel, Florida

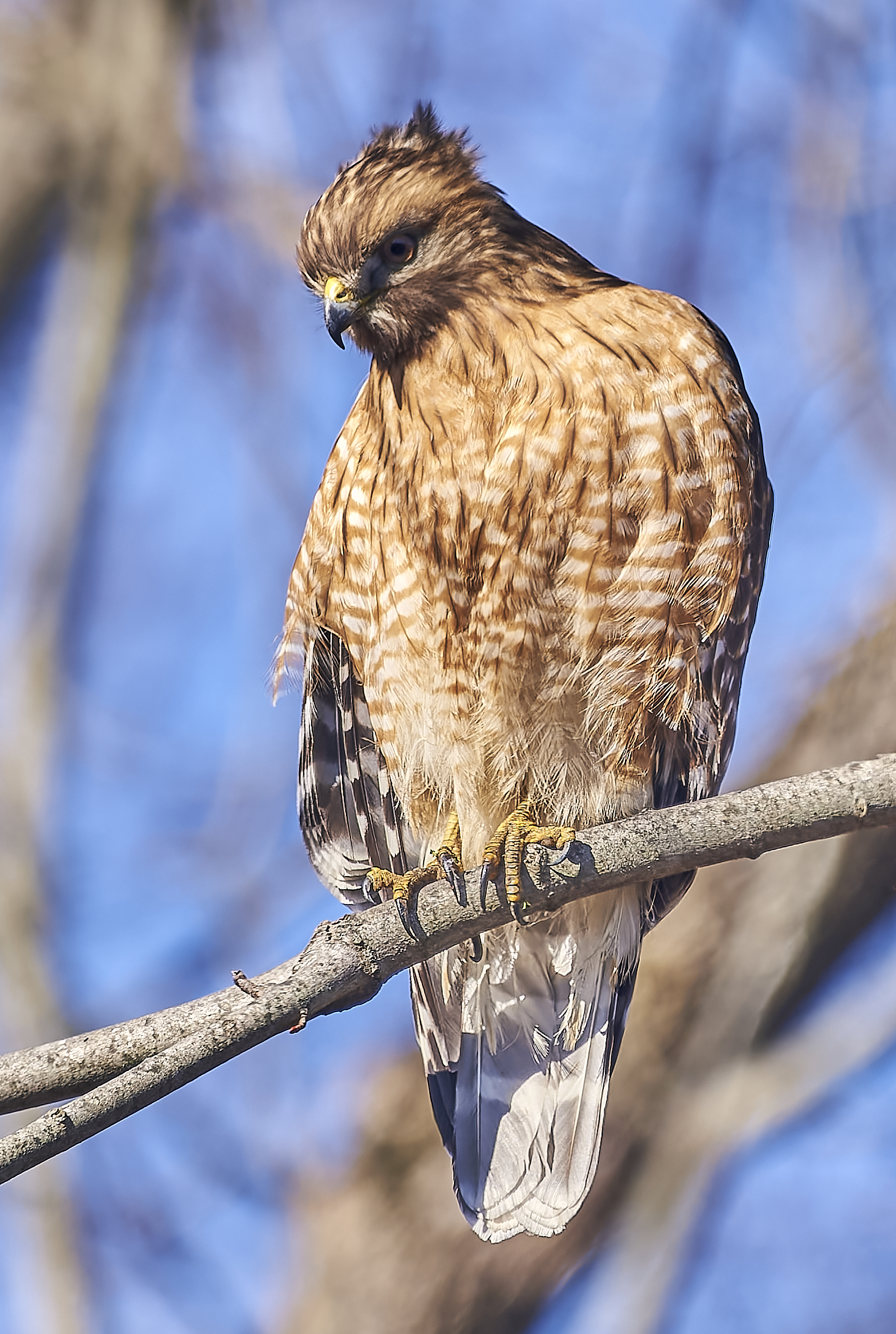
Red-shouldered hawk, scanning, East Hartford, Connecticut

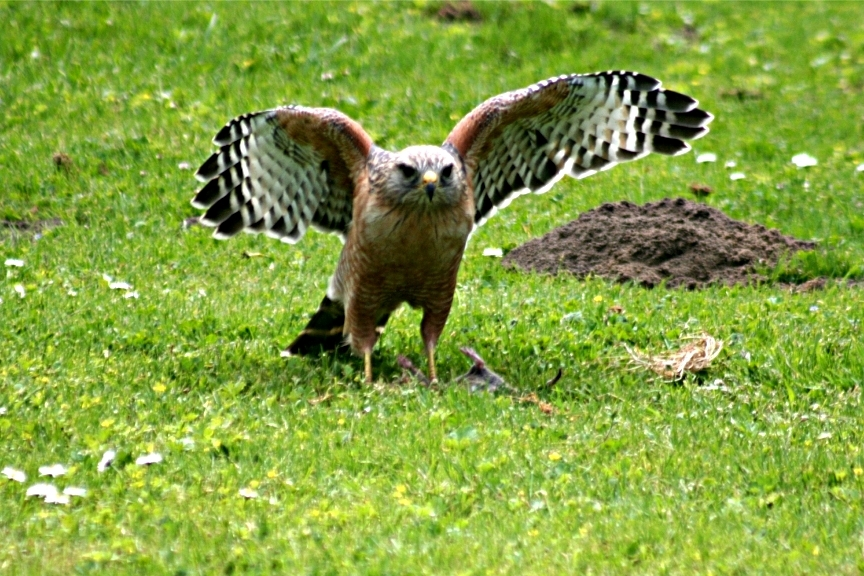
Red-shouldered hawk with a kill

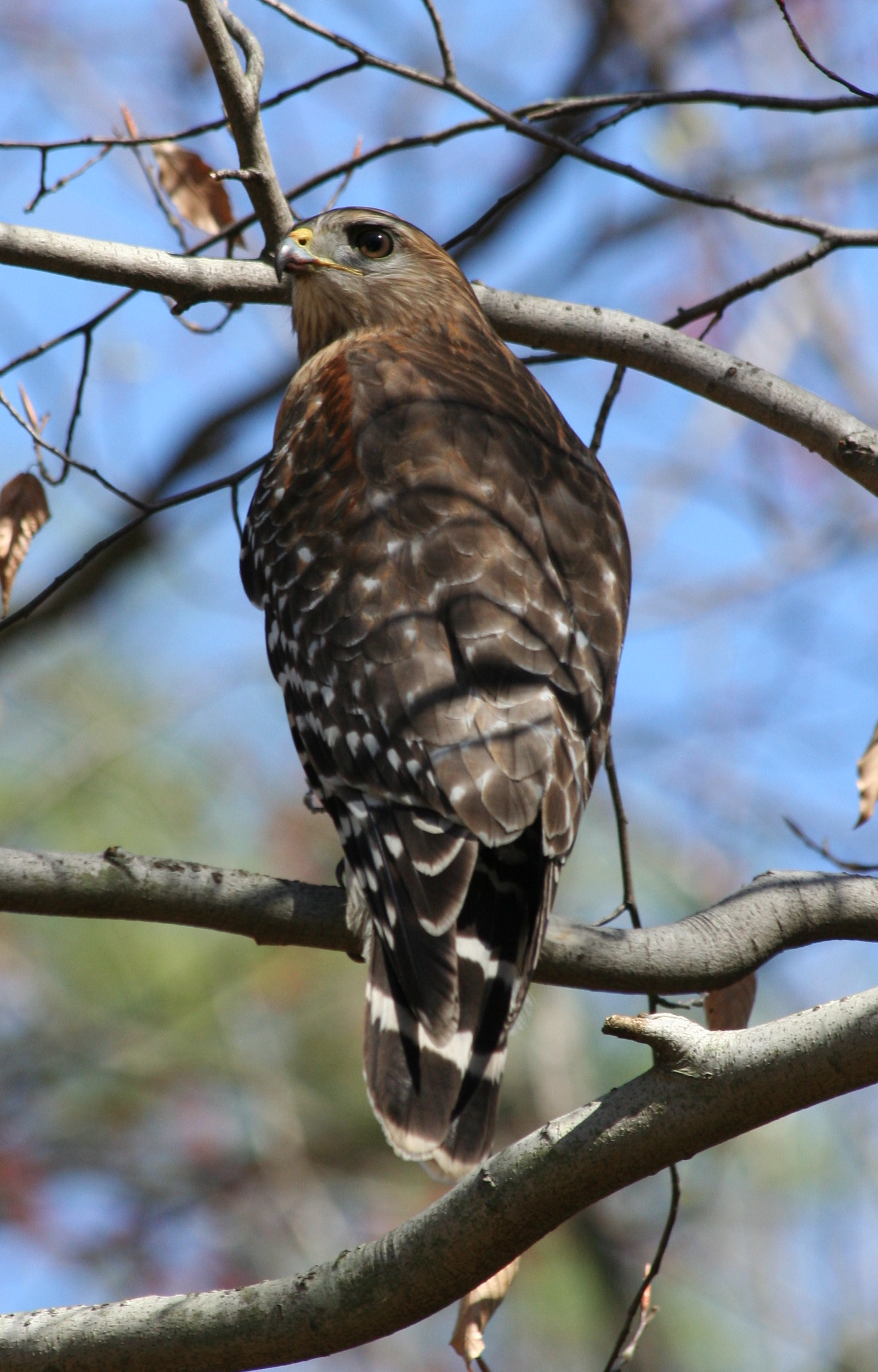
Dunwoody, Georgia

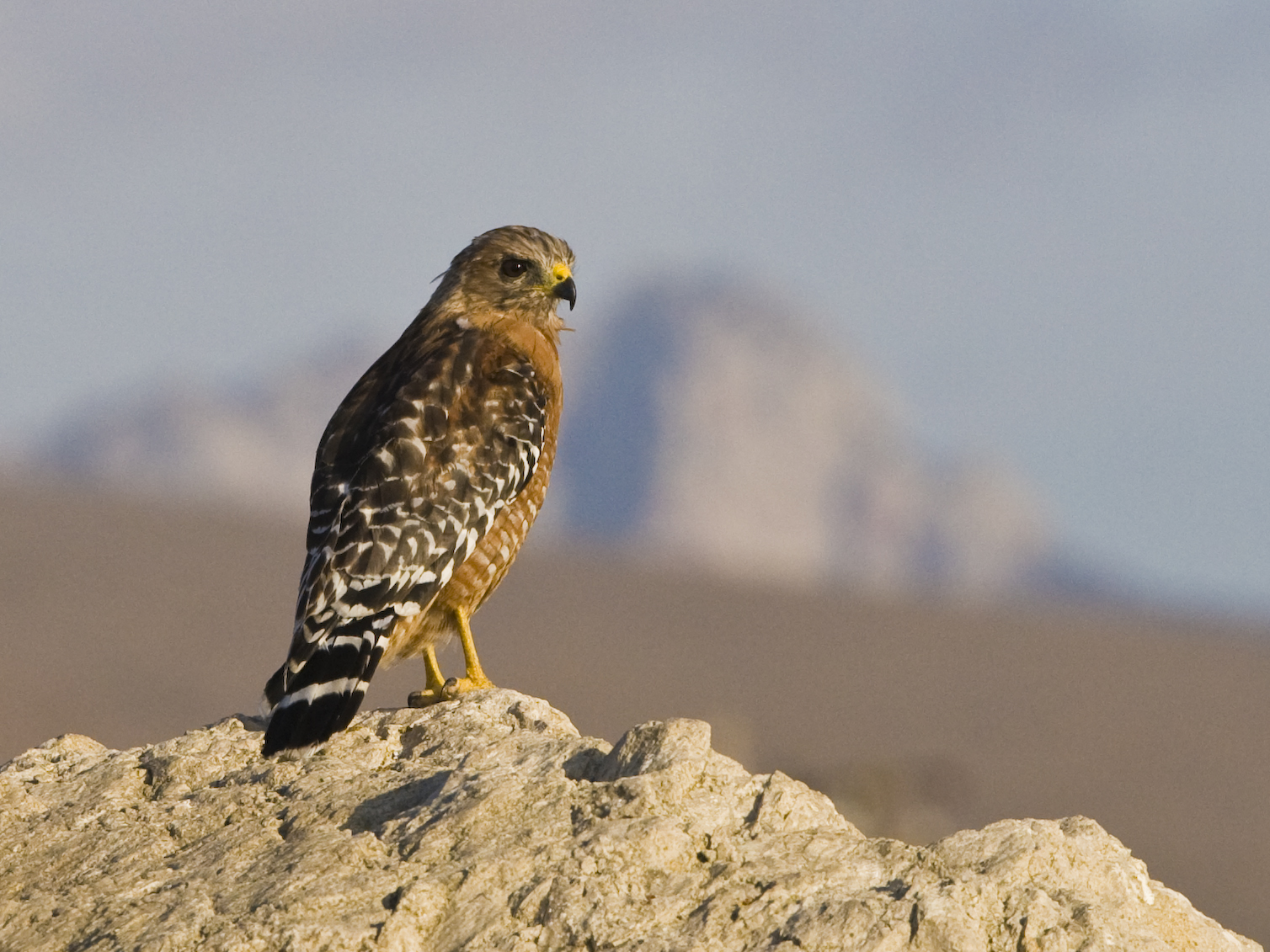
Cloisters City Park, Morro Bay, California

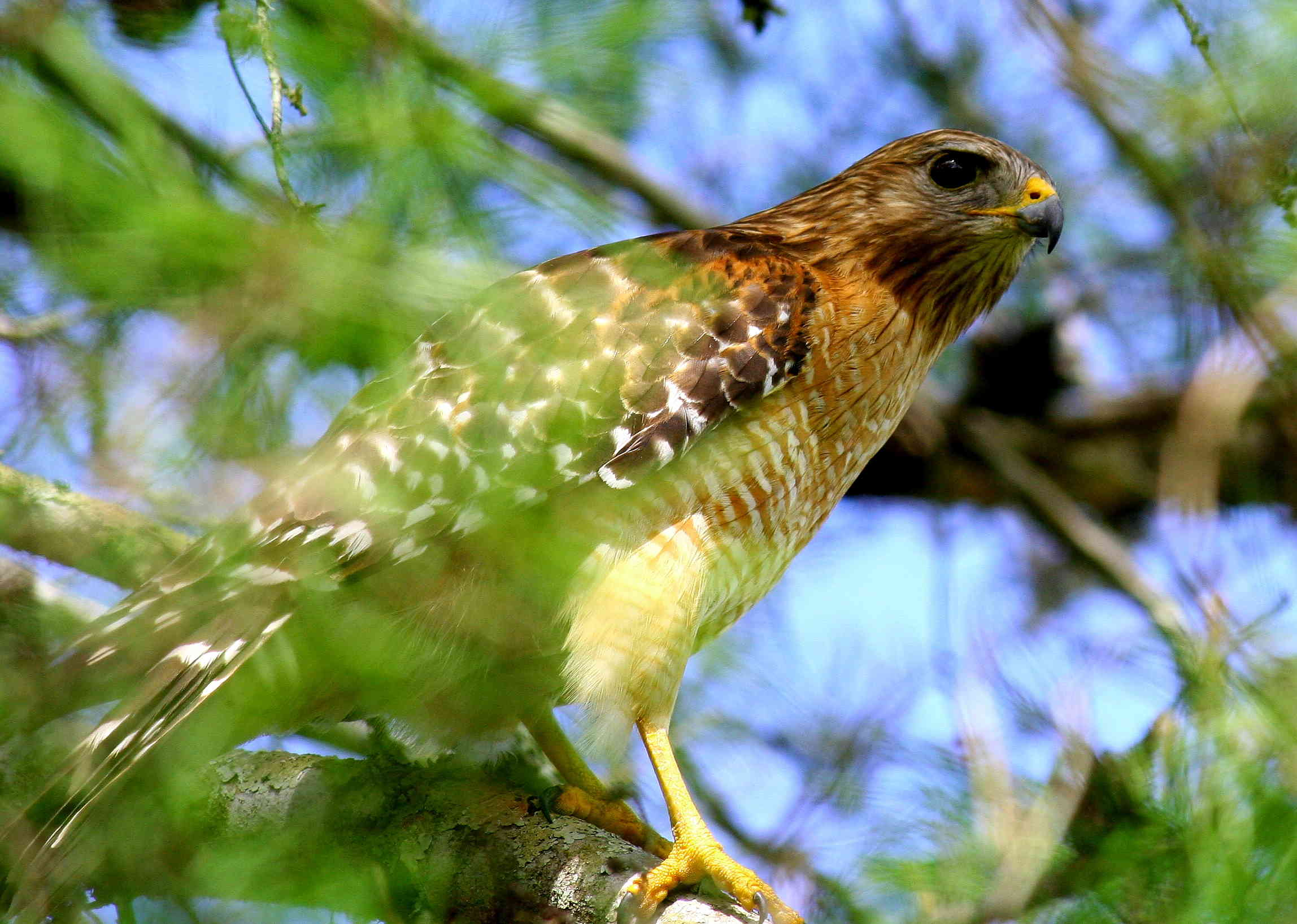
Kanapaha Botanical Gardens, Gainesville, Florida

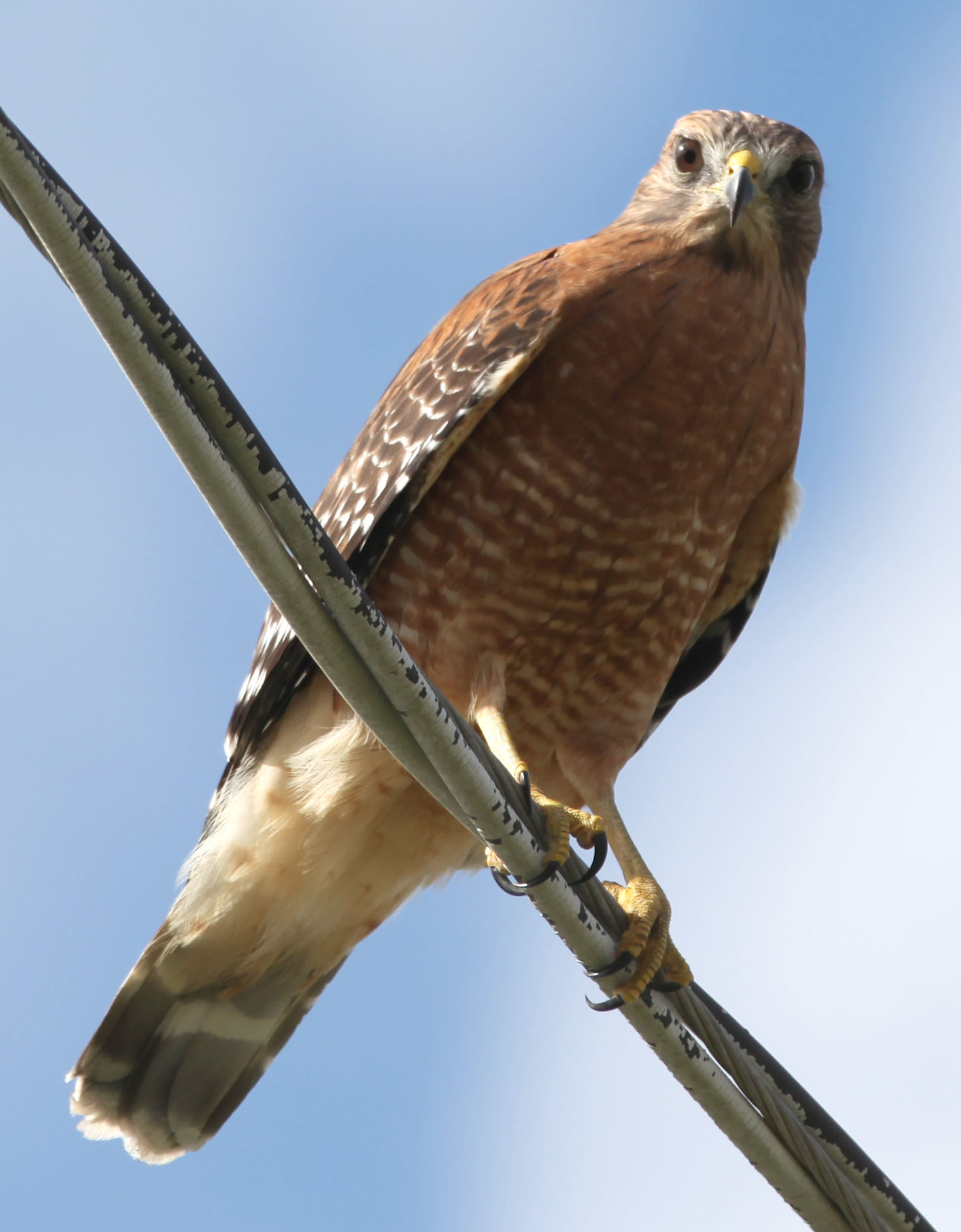
Palm Beach County, Florida

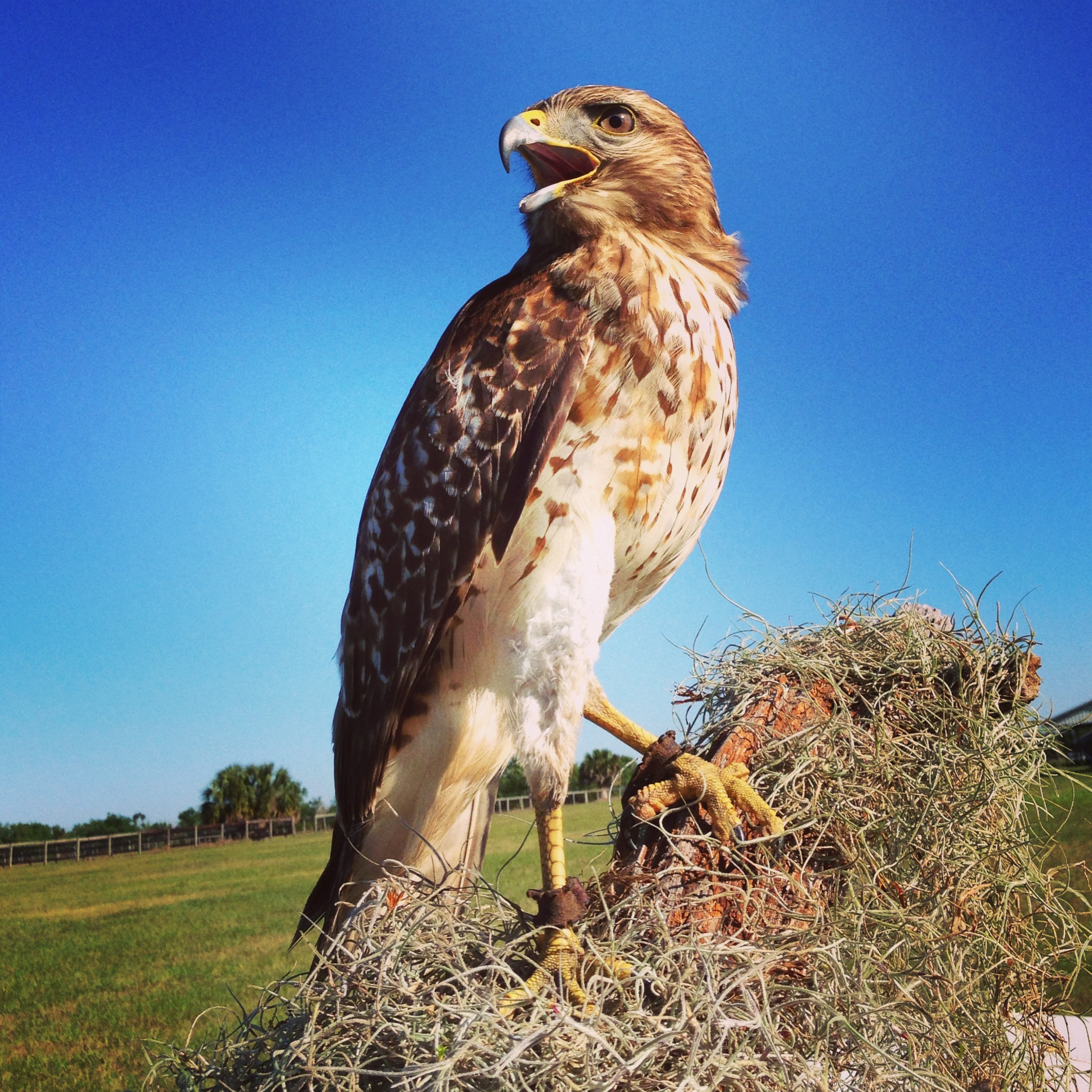
Avian Reconditioning Center, Florida

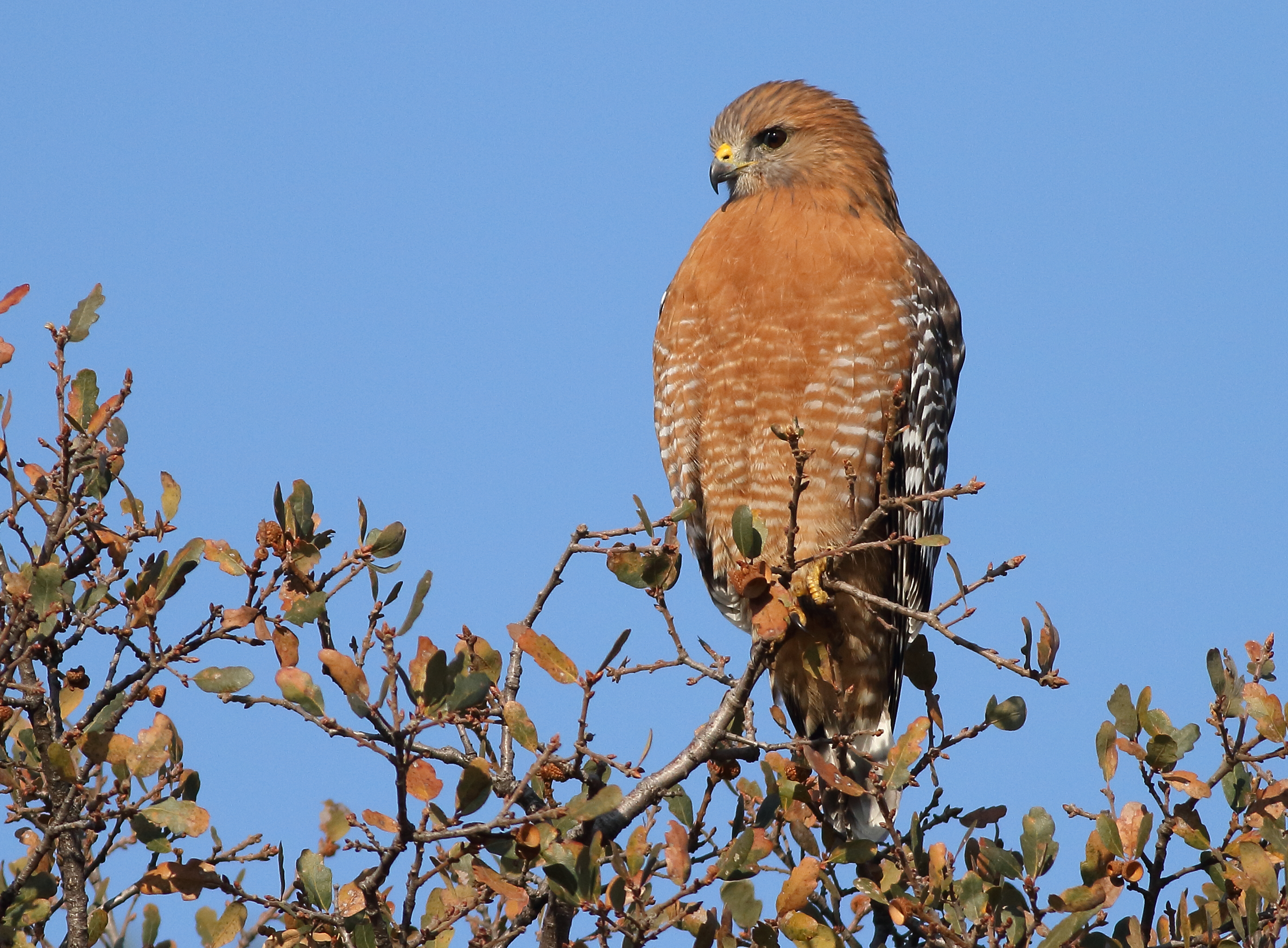
Placer County, California
