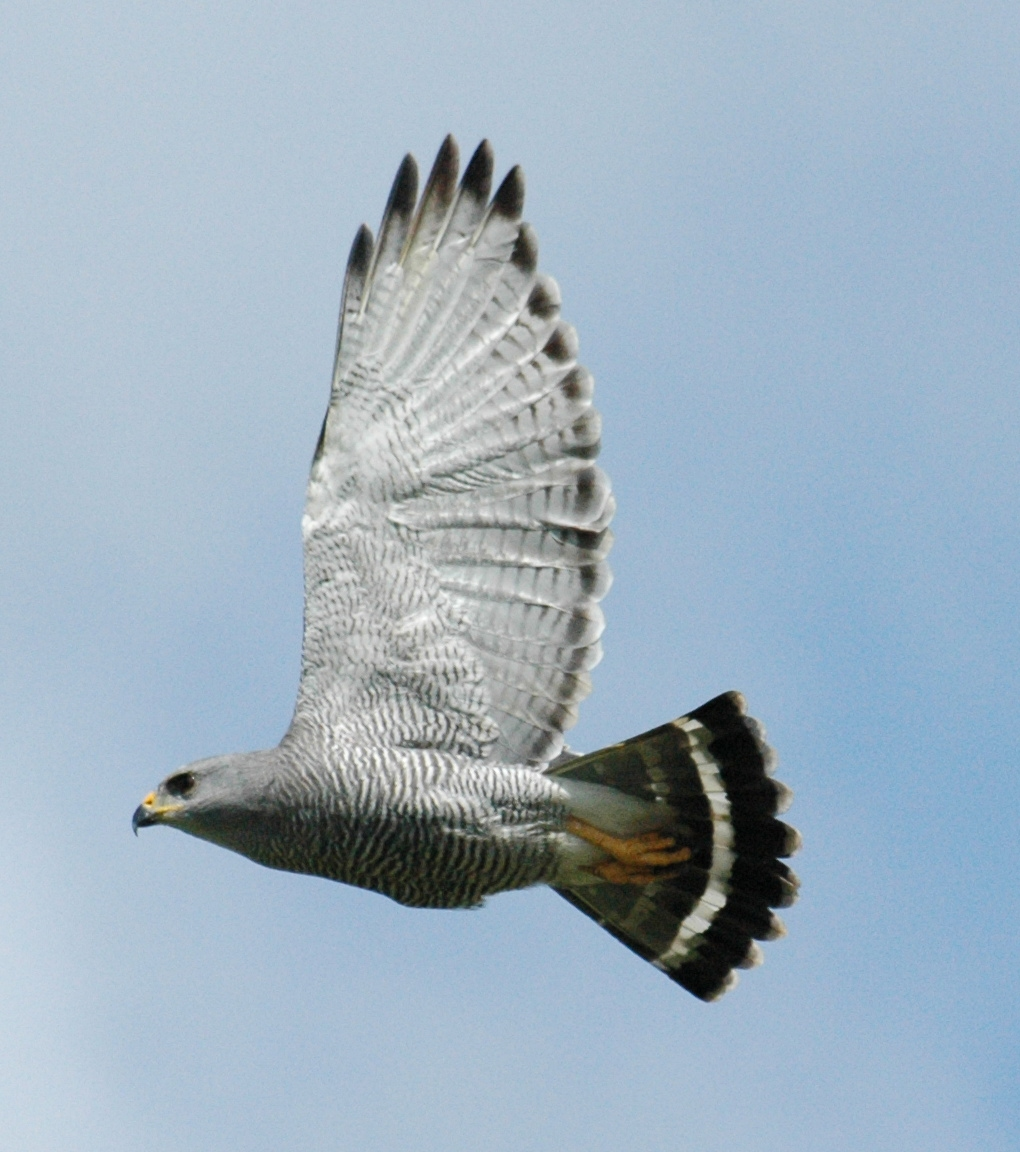

Conservation status
- Least Concern (IUCN 3.1)

Scientific classification
- Kingdom: Animalia
- Phylum: Chordata
- Class: Aves
- Order: Accipitriformes
- Family: Accipitridae
- Genus: Buteo
- Species: B. plagiatus

Binomial name
- Buteo plagiatus (Schlegel, 1862)
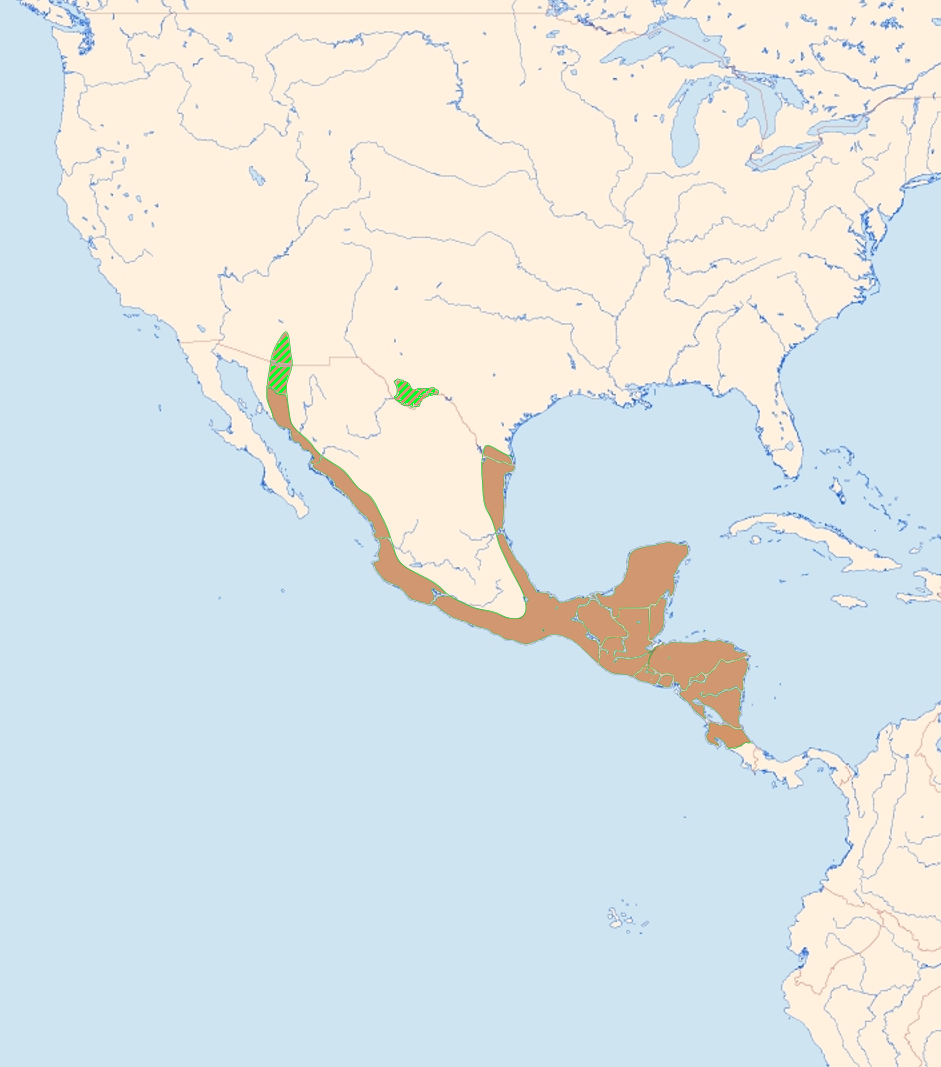

Synonyms
- Asturina plagiata Buteo nitidus plagiatus Asturina nitida plagiata

= Gray hawk =

Species of raptor

The gray hawk (Buteo plagiatus) or Mexican goshawk is a smallish raptor found in open country and forest edges. It is sometimes placed in the genus Asturina as Asturina plagiata. The species was split by the American Ornithological Society (AOU) from the gray-lined hawk. The gray hawk is found from Costa Rica north into the southwestern United States.

The gray hawk is 46–61 cm (18–24 in) in length and weighs 475 g (16.8 oz) on average. The adult has a pale gray body, the tail is black with three white bands and the legs are orange. It is a solid, unpatterned gray on the upper parts.

Immature birds have dark brown upperparts, a pale-banded brown tail, brown-spotted white underparts and a brown streaked buff head and neck. This species is quite short-winged, and has a fast agile flight for a Buteo. The call is a shrill whistled kleee-ooo.

The gray hawk feeds mainly on lizards and snakes, but will also take small mammals, birds and frogs. It usually sits on an open high perch from which it swoops on its prey, but will also hunt from a low glide. The nest is of sticks and built high in a tree. The usual clutch is one to three, usually two white to pale blue eggs. The young take about 6 weeks to fledging.

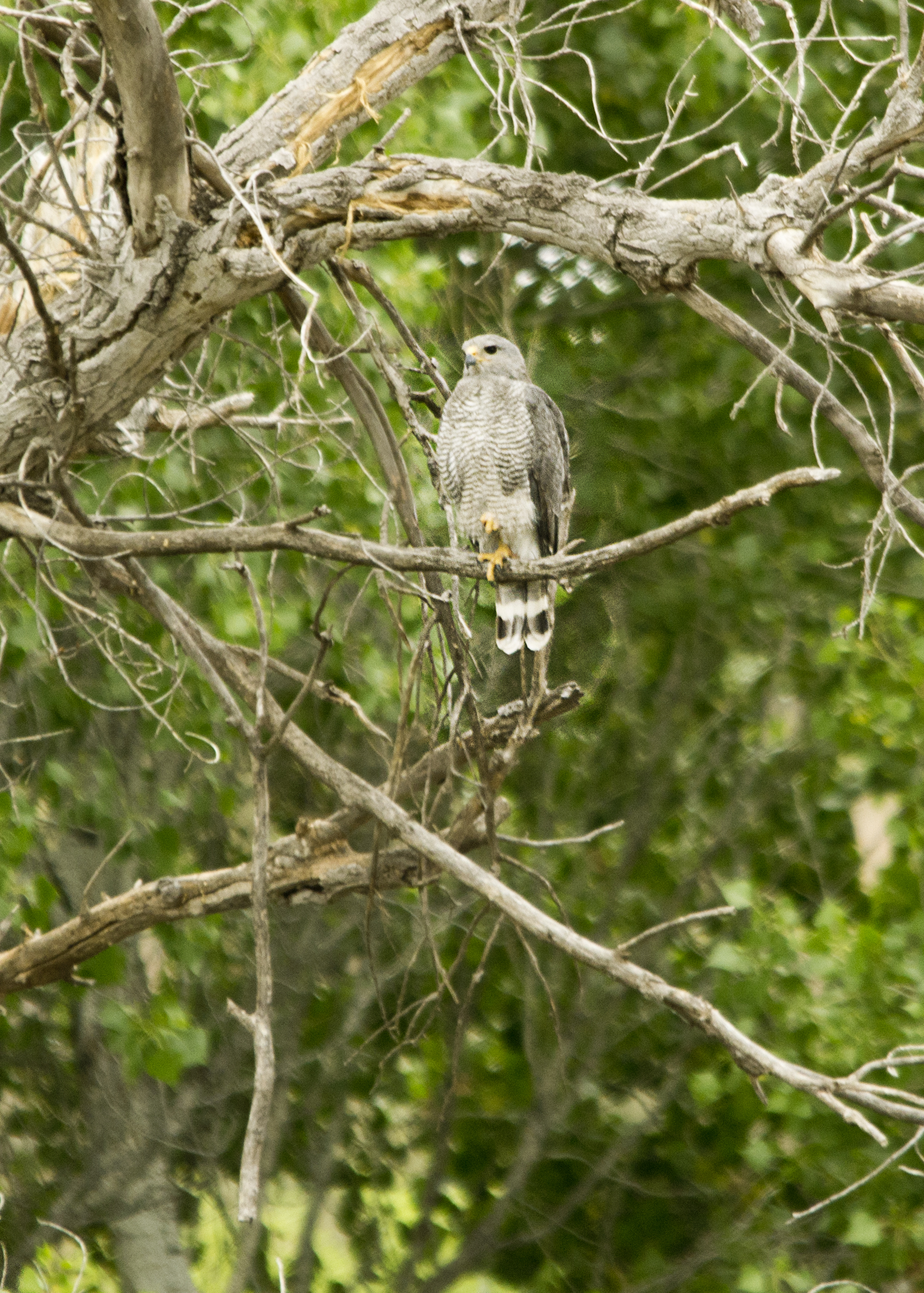
Near Phoenix, Arizona

== Taxonomy ==
The taxonomy of the gray hawk puts it in the genus Buteo. This genus consists of hawks, which include the red-shouldered hawk, Swainson's hawk, and others. The genus Buteo is in the sub-family Buteoninae known as "the real hawks", and Buteoninae is within the family of Accipitridae. Accipitridae consist of hawks, old world vultures, kites, harriers, and eagles. This family is within the order Accipitriformes which are the diurnal (active during the day) birds of prey.

The species was originally described by Hermann Schlegel in 1862 as Asturina plagiata. The AOU listed A. plagiata with the common name "Mexican goshawk" in the first four editions of the Check-List of North American Birds, from 1886–1931. By the 1957 fifth edition, it had been merged into Buteo nitidis; but by the 1998 seventh edition all of B. nitidis was separated into the resurrected genus Asturina.

In 2003, Riesing et al. published results of research on nucleotide sequences within the mitochondrial nd6 gene and pseudo-control-region for all species of Buteo and several related species. Among other findings, they recommended that Asturina be merged into Buteo, and concluded that A. nitidis plagiatus was sufficiently different from A. n. nitidis and A. n. costaricensis to be considered a separate species. In 2005, the AOC's Committee on Classification and Nomenclature – North America decided to follow the recommendation to merge the genera, but was not convinced about splitting the species.

The gray hawk was originally Asturina nitida but controversy existed between ornithologists on whether or not this species was closely enough related to put it in the genus Buteo, but chromosomal mapping in 2013 has proved that the gray hawk is within the Buteoninae. Researchers such as de Oliveira, Tagliarini, dos Santos, O'Brien, and Ferguson-Smith proposed in 2011 that the gray hawk should be two different species, because of a slight difference in plumage color and a difference in alarm calls documented in the northern and southern distributional gap in Costa Rica. They suggest that the species is better split into the gray-lined hawk (Buteo nitidus) and the gray hawk (Buteo plagiatus), The American Ornithological Society eventually recognized the split.

== Description ==
The gray hawk averages 46–61 cm (18–24 in) inches in length and weighs 475 g (16.8 oz). This bird has a relatively shorter wing span, but a long tail compared to the red-tailed and red-shouldered hawks. It has broad rounded wings, a hooked beak, and yellow legs. Thompson, L. (1995–2013). It is very distinctive from its smooth pale gray plumage. The tail features are in a horizontal striped pattern in a white-gray-white pattern with white at the tips of the tail feathers. The tail feathers have two white bands with one being wider than the other. The sexes are similar in coloration. The adults, both male and female, have a darker gray top side with a lighter gray and white underside. The juveniles have a dark brown topside and a streaked or spotted underside and the tail feathers have numerous dark bands. The juveniles have very obvious bold facial strips and white upper tail coverts, which are the feathers at the base or start of the tail. The juveniles also have a different plumage color due to dominance and they use the dull color for camouflage.

== Distribution and habitat ==
The gray hawk's range is in Northern and Central America, from southern New Mexico, southern Arizona, to central Texas, through Mexico, Guatemala, Belize, El Salvador, Honduras, Nicaragua, to the northern part of Costa Rica.

Its habitat within this range consists of forest edges, river edges, clear cuts, savanna, and agricultural land (4). In their tropical range of the Amazon they tend to prefer a more dry second growth forest.

== Behaviour ==
=== Diet ===
The gray hawk's main diet is lizards and small snakes, but it will also eat large insects, small rodents, and some birds. It hunts in brushy areas either from a perch or flight just above the canopy.

=== Migration ===
The migration pattern of gray hawks depends on the location of the animals' home range. Birds that live in northern Mexico and the south-western United States will migrate, but birds living further south tend to stay in the same area permanently. A few birds in the northern range will stay in the southern part of Texas year round rather than migrating, but this is rare. The birds that migrate north to the south-western United States will migrate in the spring in order to breed. After the breeding season, the birds will begin their journey back south in mid-October to their wintering ranges.

=== Reproduction ===
The mating system of the gray hawk is monogamous. During December through May, the breeding season, these birds perform courtship displays (4). The males court the females by rising and falling flight, calls, and nest building. The male and female together will build their stick nest in tall trees, but the male only lays down the foundation while the female will shape the nest (9). The nest is about 60 centimeters across and the female will on average lay 2 to 3 pale-blue eggs per clutch. The female takes care of her eggs incubating them for 33 days; meanwhile the male will capture prey and bring it back to the female. A few breeding pairs nest along the Rio Grande in riparian woods (1). In research conducted from 1995–97 in south-west Arizona, it was found that gray hawks produced an average of 1.32 young per nest between all three years when the study was being conducted (8). The chicks will begin fledging in 6 weeks and both males and females won't hit sexual maturity until they are least 2 years of age.

Like other mid-sized hawks, gray hawks may be vulnerable to larger birds of prey. Raptor nestlings in the tropics may on rare occasions succumb to predation from arboreal hunters such as monkeys, coatis, snakes, and other birds, so it is possible that gray hawk nestlings may as well.

=== Voice ===
The call of the gray hawk consists of long mournful whistles thoooooweeo, hoooooweeo.
