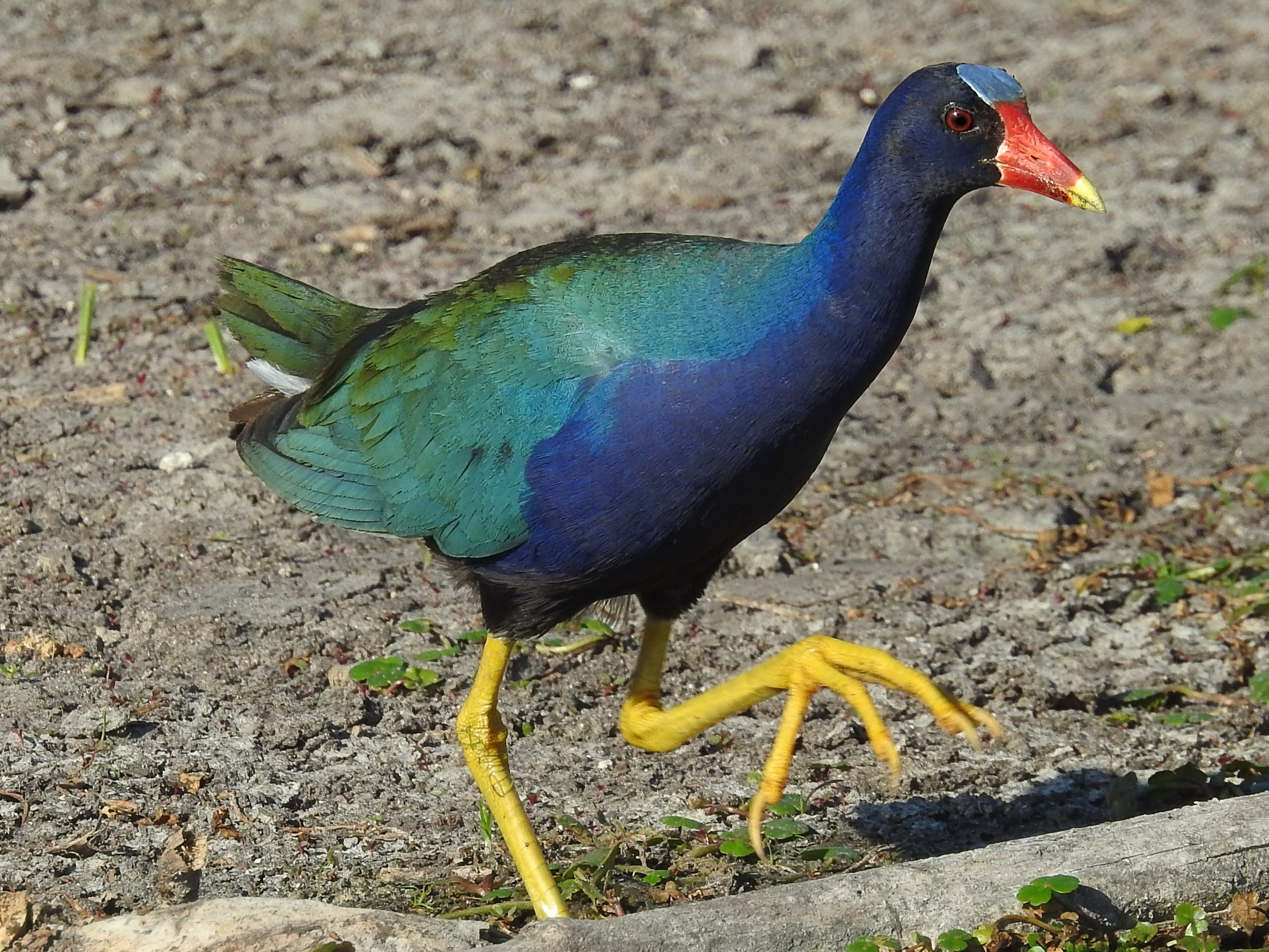
- adult
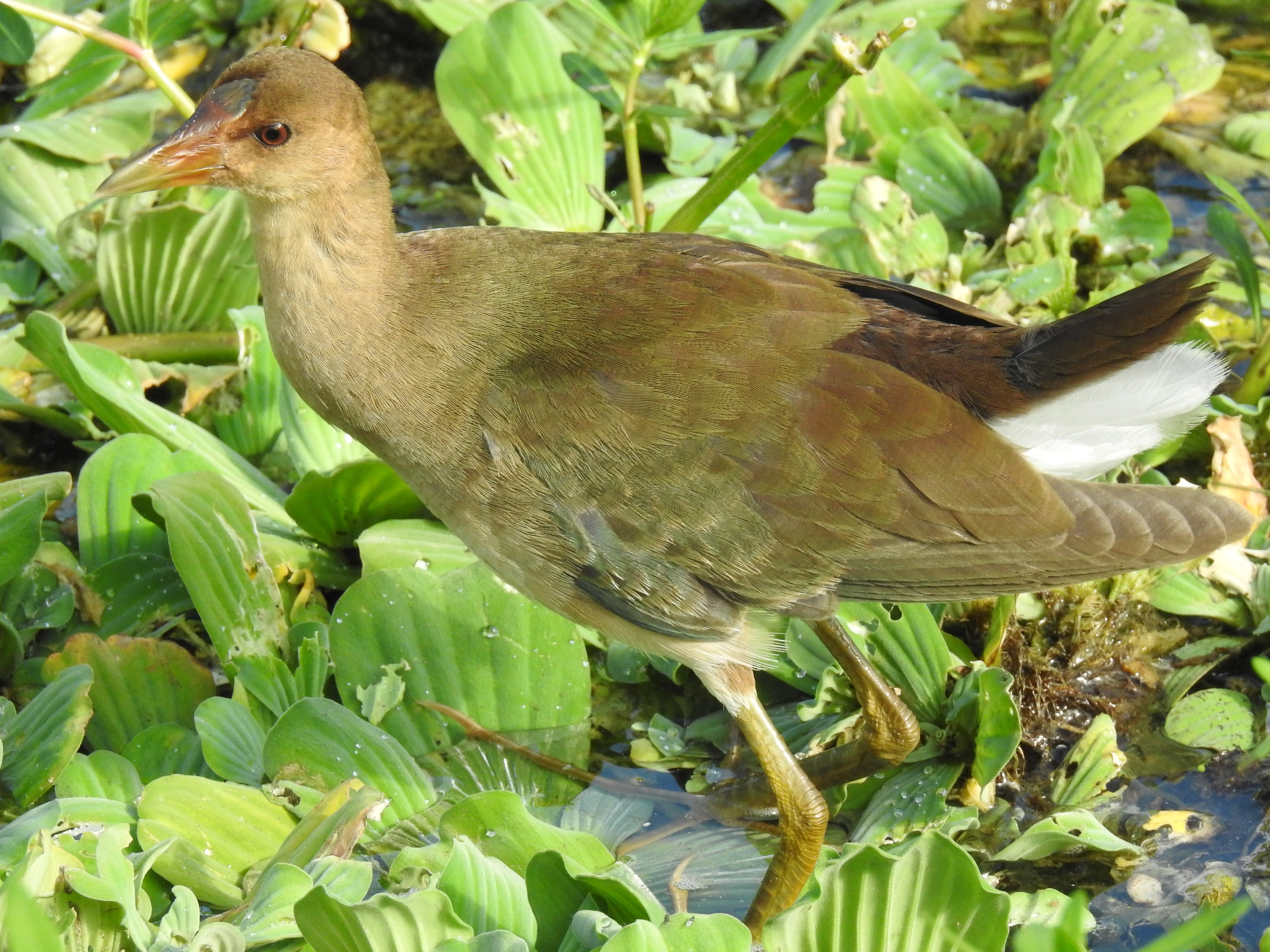
- juvenile

Conservation status
- Least Concern (IUCN 3.1)

Scientific classification
- Kingdom: Animalia
- Phylum: Chordata
- Class: Aves
- Order: Gruiformes
- Family: Rallidae
- Genus: Porphyrio
- Species: P. martinica

Binomial name
- Porphyrio martinica (Linnaeus, 1766)
- Year-round Breeding Nonbreeding

Synonyms
- Fulica martinica Linnaeus, 1766; Porphyrula martinica; Porphyrio martinicus (lapsus)

= American purple gallinule =

Purple gallinule

Species of bird

The purple gallinule (Porphyrio martinica) is a species of swamphen found in the Americas. It is in the order Gruiformes, meaning "crane-like", an order which also contains cranes, rails, and crakes. The purple gallinule is a rail species, placing it into the family Rallidae. It is also known locally as the yellow-legged gallinule. The specific name martinica denotes "of Martinique".

== Description ==
The purple gallinule is a medium-sized rail, measuring 26–37 cm (10–15 in) in length, spanning 50–61 cm (20–24 in) across the wings and weighing 141–305 g (5.0–10.8 oz). Males, averaging 257 g (9.1 oz) in mass, are slightly larger than females, at 215 g (7.6 oz) on average. An adult purple gallinule has purple-blue plumage that will shine green and turquoise when in good lighting. Adults also have a pale blue shield on their forehead, which connects with the red and yellow bill. Darkness or low light can dim the bright purple-blue plumage of the adult to make them look dusky or brownish, although the forehead shield color differentiates them from similar species such as common gallinules. Immature purple gallinules are a brown-bronze color, with purple feathers on chest, and the bill and forehead shield is pale in color. Juvenile birds are light brown with hints of green-bronze on the wings and back, and white under-tail coverts.

Purple gallinules have long toes that help them walk onto floating vegetation, by distributing their weight across a large surface area. They have an anisodactyl toe arrangement that also helps them to cling to plant stems. Adults have bright yellow legs and feet, immatures have brown-yellowish legs and feet, and juveniles have brown legs and feet. When they fly, their legs hang down. They usually fly short distances.

== Distribution and habitat ==
These birds are found in the southeastern states of the United States during the breeding season. They are resident species in southern Florida, the Gulf and Pacific coast of Mexico, parts of Central America, and the Caribbean. During the non-breeding season, they are found more inland in parts of Central America. They can also be found within South America during migration, and sometimes strays can be found as far north as Canada. The species' habitat is freshwater marsh with dense stands of vegetation.

The species has the greatest pattern of vagrancy amongst rails, with individuals recorded as far west as California and the Galápagos Islands, as far north as Iceland and Labrador, as far south as Tierra del Fuego, and as far east as Great Britain, Portugal and Cape Verde.

This species has been recorded in the Cape Province of South Africa twenty-one times. Most of the birds were juveniles, so it is very unlikely that a breeding ground will be established there.

== Behaviour and ecology ==
=== Breeding ===
The courtship of purple gallinules occurs while they are standing and can be displayed by both sexes. Courtship occurs when the birds of a pair have been separated and then wander close to one another. They then perform the principal display, which is performed by both sexes at the same time. The display entails the bird standing in a slightly bent forward position, with the neck outstretched. The wings are held at an almost right angle to the body and bent at the wrist, so that the primaries are angled down. Following the principal display, one or both of the birds will strut and cut across the path of the other with half-lowered wings, or they will make a deep bow as they approach each other.

The floating nest is placed within the dense vegetation along the shallow margins of lakes, rivers, and marshes' shorelines. They lay between five and ten eggs that are buff or pale pink with brown and purple spots. Purple gallinules' nest and territories are defended by the monogamous pair, and the juveniles remain in the territory to help care for siblings.

=== Food and feeding ===
Purple gallinules are omnivorous ground feeders. There is a variety of plant and animal matter within their diet. Some of the foods they consume are seeds, leaves and fruits of both aquatic and terrestrial plants, insects, insect larvae, spiders, other invertebrates, frogs, snails, earthworms, and fish. They have also been known to prey upon the eggs and young of other bird species, such as the jacana.

== Gallery ==
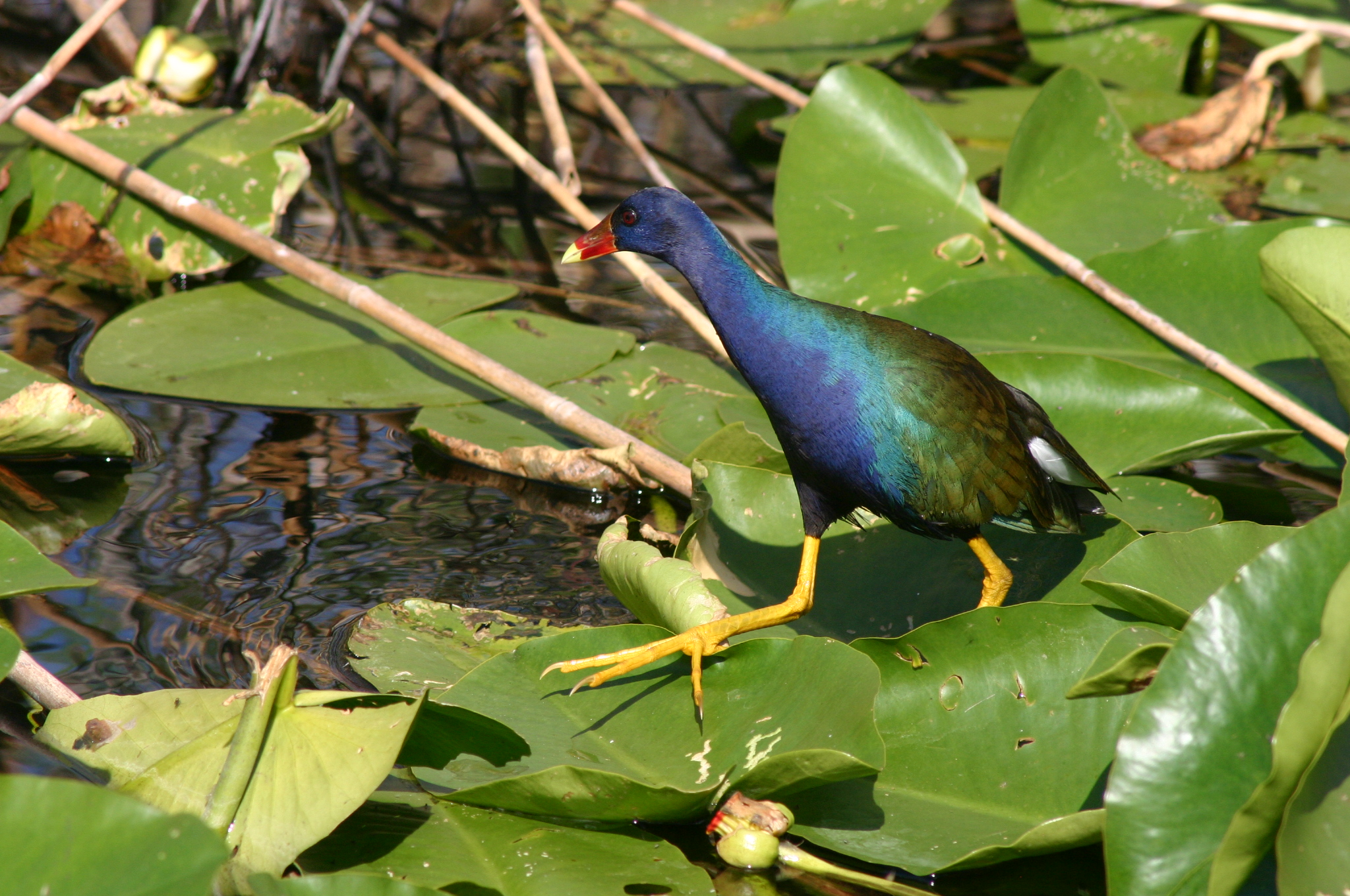
American purple gallinule found in Everglades National Park, Florida, USA

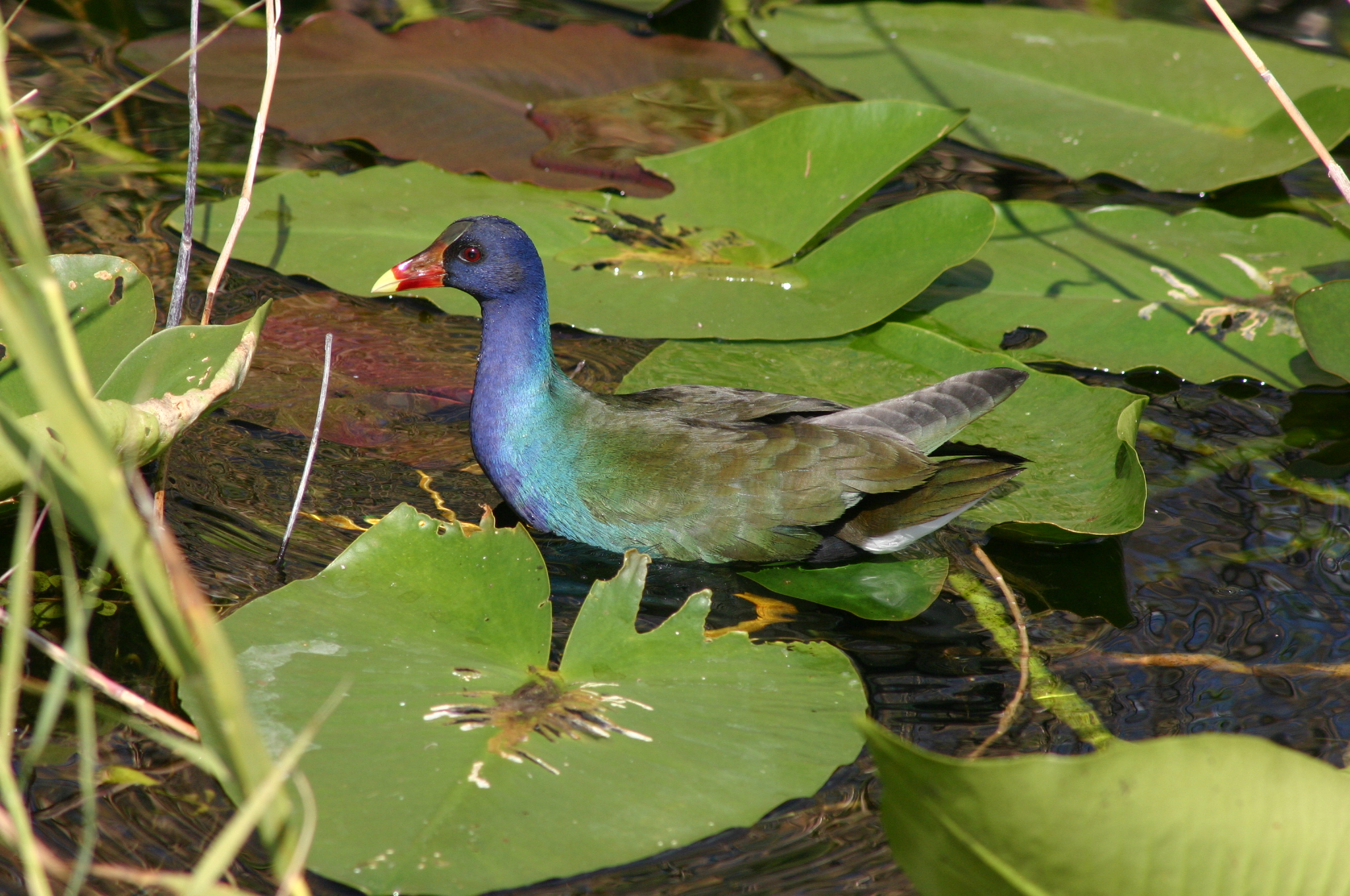
American purple gallinule found in Everglades National Park, Florida, USA

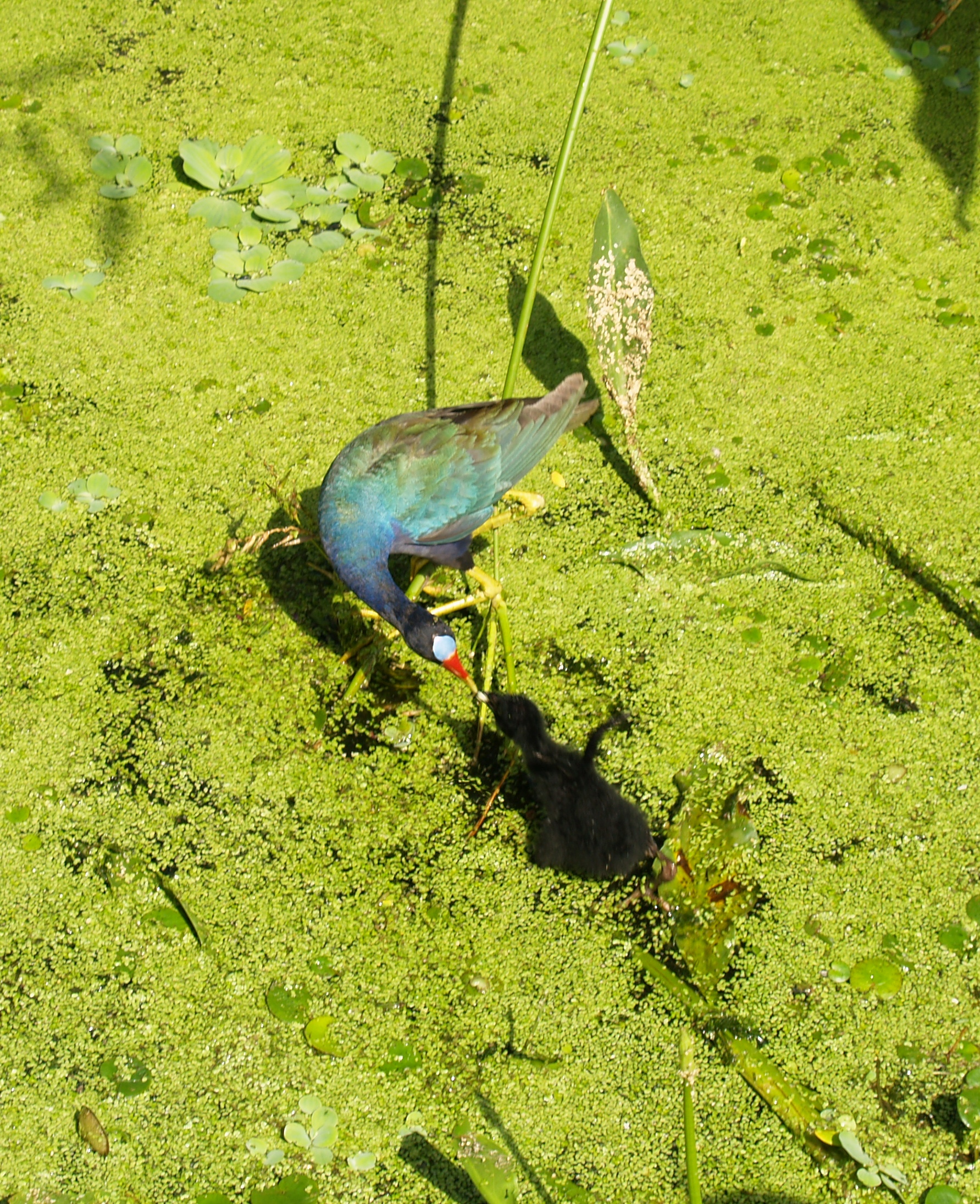
American purple gallinule, feeding a chick at the Green Cay Wetlands, Boynton Beach, Florida, USA

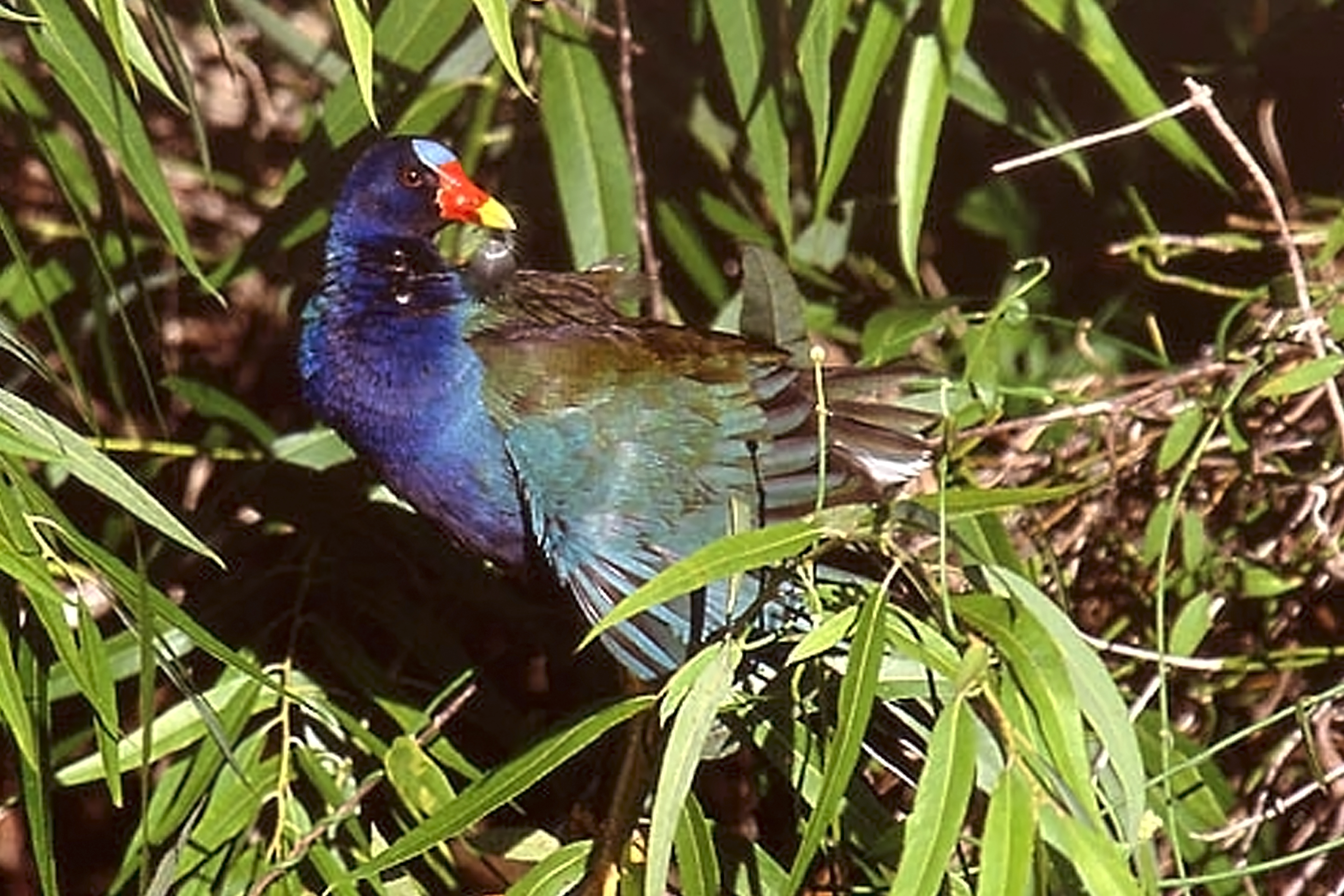
Picture of American purple gallinule, taken in the Everglades National Park.

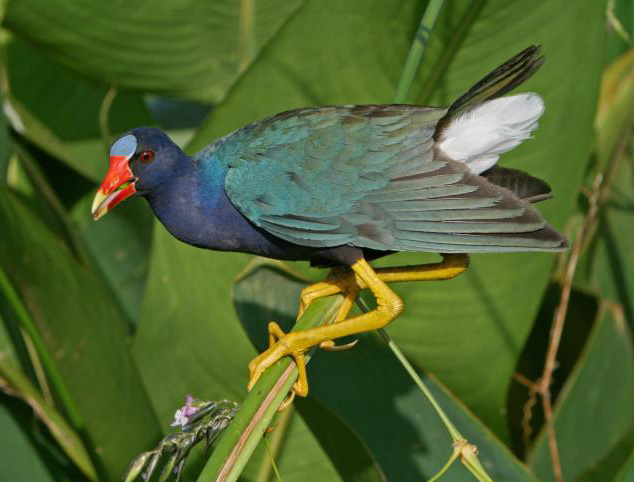
At Green Cay, Delray Beach, Florida

Slow motion of Purple Gallinule taken at Winding Waters Nature Area in Florida.

Purple Gallinule at Winding Waters Natural Area, Fl
