= Green Cay Wetlands =

Nature preserve in Boynton Beach, Florida

Coordinates: 26.487°N 80.161°W

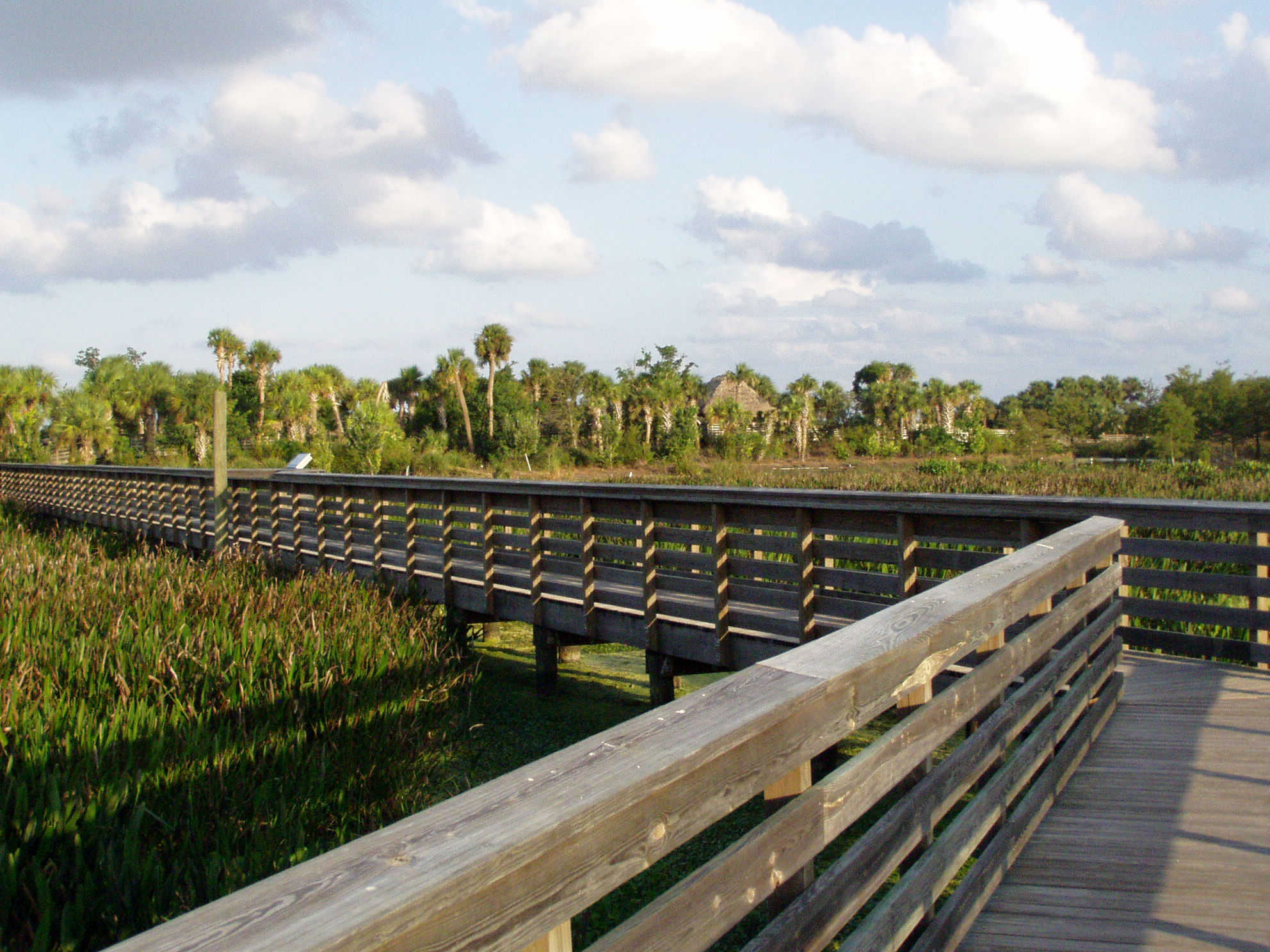
Boardwalk

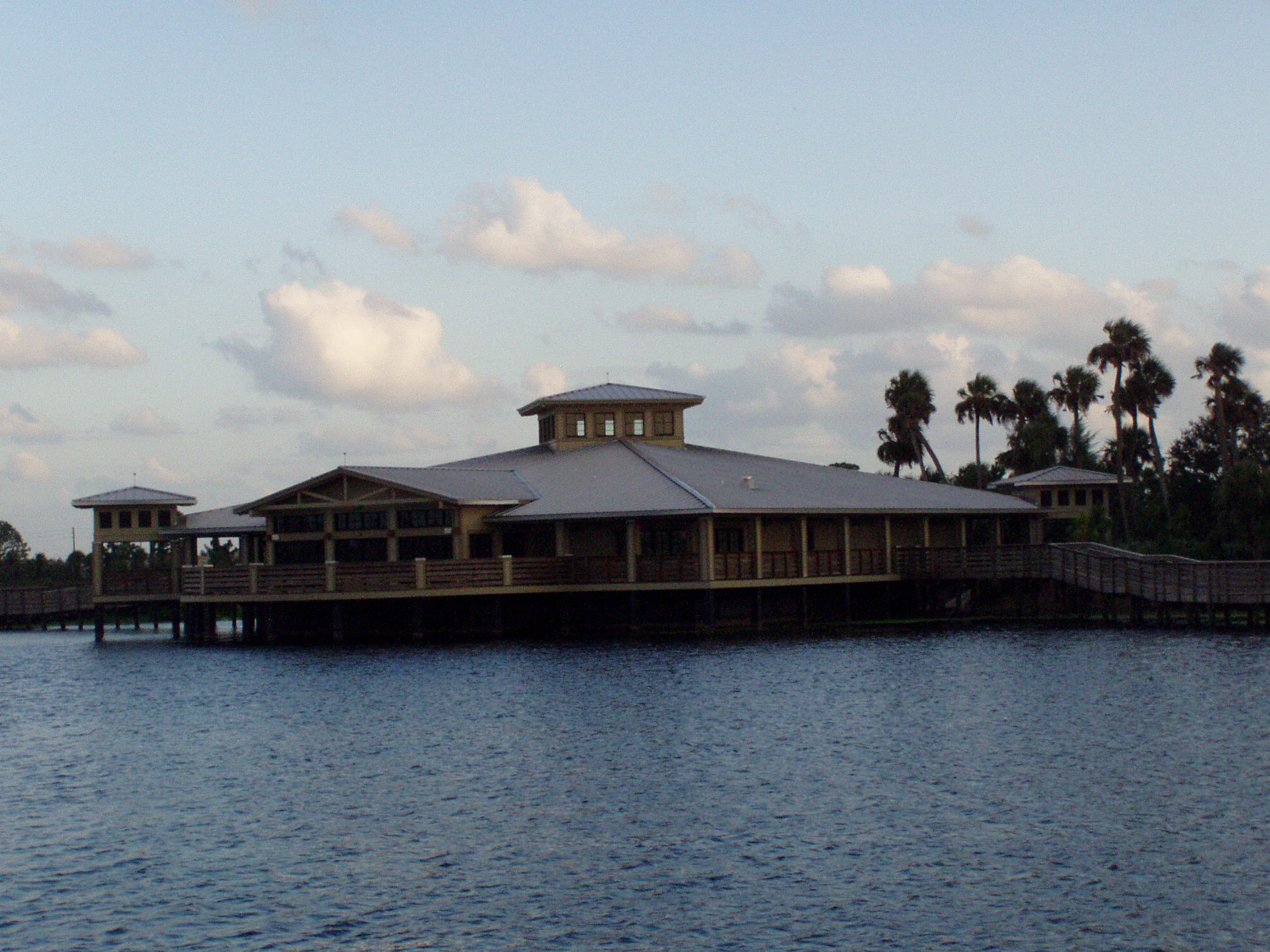
Nature Center

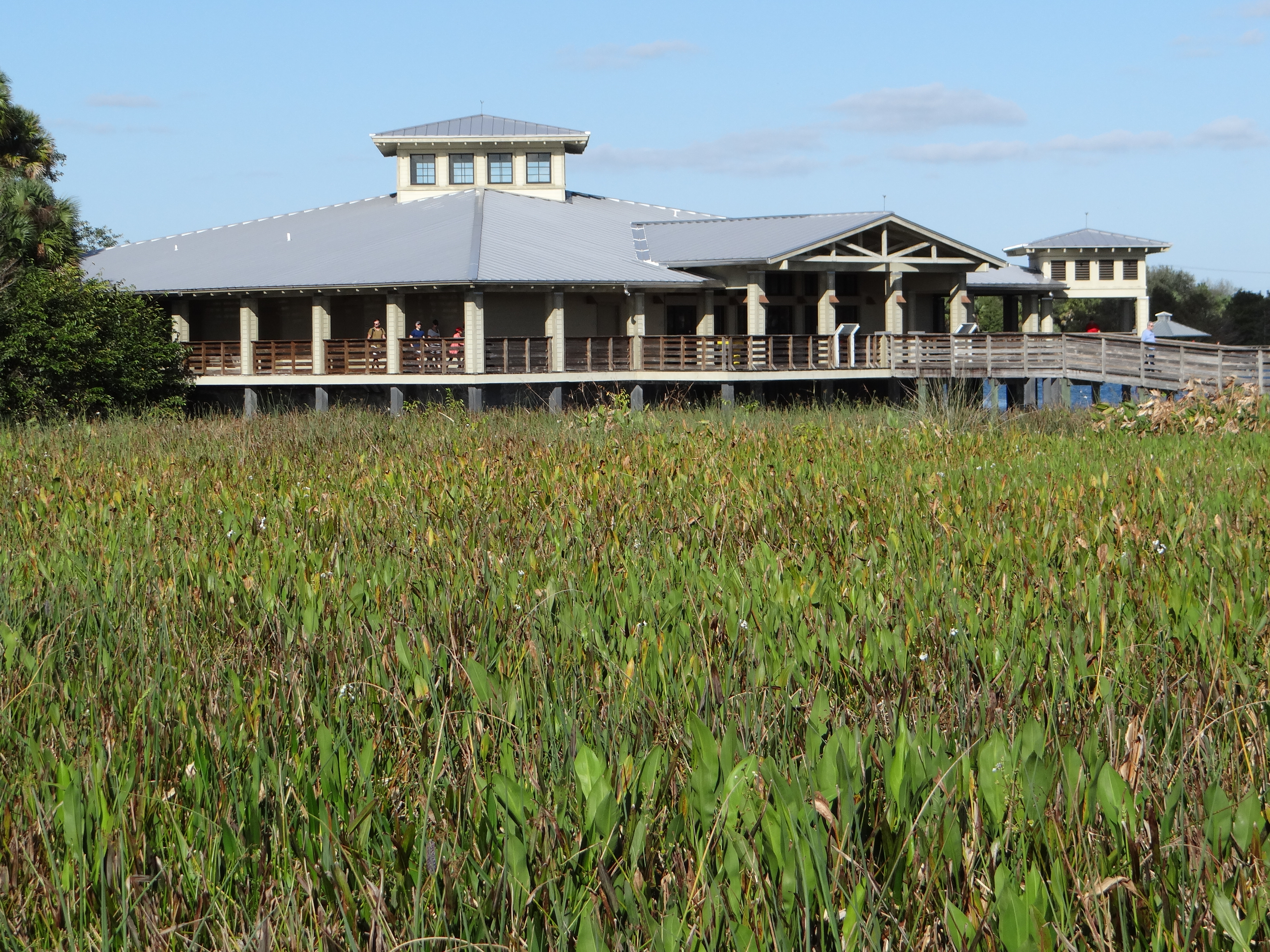
Green Cay Wetlands, Palm Beach County, Florida

Green Cay Wetlands (or Green Cay Wetlands and Nature Center) is a nature preserve located in Boynton Beach, Florida. The 100-acre (0.40 km^{2}) property was purchased in 1999 from Ted and Trudy Winsberg, who used the property for farming. The Winsbergs sold the property for 1/3 of its appraised value with the condition that it would be made into a wetland. Construction began in July 2003. It was created jointly by the Palm Beach County Utilities Department and the Palm Beach County Parks and Recreation Department in 2004. This park includes 1.5 miles (2.4 km) of an elevated wooden boardwalk, which takes visitors through various habitats, including cabbage palm hammock, cypress swamp, wetland hammock, and tropical hardwood hammock. The boardwalk also features a Seminole chickee hut as well as several gazebos, which have descriptive signs offering information on the wildlife and plant life.

The Nature Center showcases exhibits on the water cycle as well as a turtle pond, frog terrarium, American alligator hole with young live alligators, and a wetland diorama. There is also a theater, gift shop, owl, and an exhibition hall inside.

The park is a water reclamation facility, and naturally filters millions of gallons of water each day.

== Fauna ==
Many species of birds can be seen throughout the park, including purple gallinule, black-bellied whistling duck, black-crowned night heron, great egret, white ibis, common gallinule, roseate spoonbill, glossy ibis, least bittern, limpkin, mottled duck, northern rough-winged swallow, northern flicker, and sora. Reptile species include the American alligator and Florida redbelly turtle. Mammals include marsh rabbit, raccoons, bobcats, and the river otter.

== Flora ==
The park has various species of plants and trees that include but is not limited to sabal palm, live oak, bald cypress, red maple, pickerelweed, royal palm, duckweed, and giant bulrush.
