= List of people from the United States Virgin Islands =

Flag of the U.S. Virgin Islands

This is a list of prominent people who were born in, lived in, or are otherwise closely associated with the United States Virgin Islands (which are composed of the islands of St. Croix, St. John, and St. Thomas). This list does not include people from the British Virgin Islands. The list covers notable individuals who have garnered international recognition in artistic, cultural, economic, historical, notorious, and political arenas.

== Actors, filmmakers, and models ==
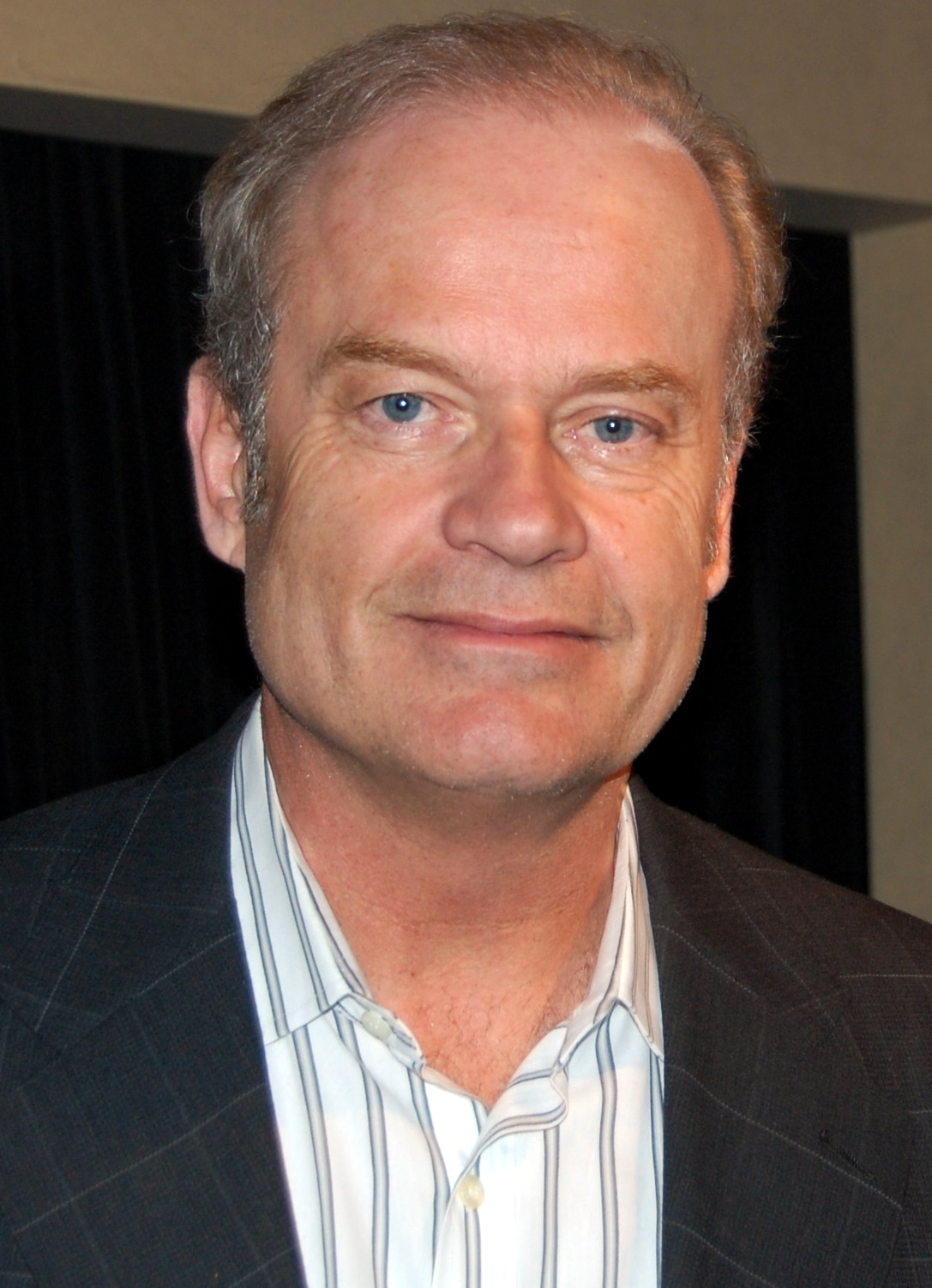
Kelsey Grammer

- Lisa Canning (born 1966), television actress from St. Thomas.
- Omari K. Chancellor, actor born and raised in St. Croix.
- Lilibet Foster, filmmaker raised in St. Thomas.
- Kelsey Grammer (born 1955), actor, born in St. Thomas.
- Janelle James (born 1979), actor, born in St. Thomas.
- Hannah Jeter (born 1990), Sports Illustrated Swimsuit Issue model; born and raised on St. Thomas.
- Janeisha John (b. 1988), model from the U.S. Virgin Islands.
- Jasmin St. Claire (born 1970), adult film actress, born in St. Croix.

== Artists ==
- La Vaughn Belle (born 1974), artist from St. Thomas.
- Peter Bentzon (1783-1850), silversmith from St. Croix.
- Urania P. Cummings (1889-1978), artist born in St. Thomas.
- Austin Hansen (1910-1996), photographer born in St. Thomas.
- Christine Jowers, dancer and dance critic raised in St. Thomas.
- Fraser Kershaw, philanthropist, film artist from St. Croix.
- Fritz Melbye (1826–1869), marine painter; born in Denmark, lived and painted in the Danish West Indies.
- Ademola Olugebefola (b. 1941), multidisciplinary artist from St. Thomas.
- Camille Pissarro (1830–1903), artist, French Impressionist painter from St. Thomas.

== Athletes ==
A

- Anne Abernathy (born 1953), luge and archery athlete from the U.S. Virgin Islands.

B

- Raja Bell (born 1976), former professional basketball player born in St. Croix.
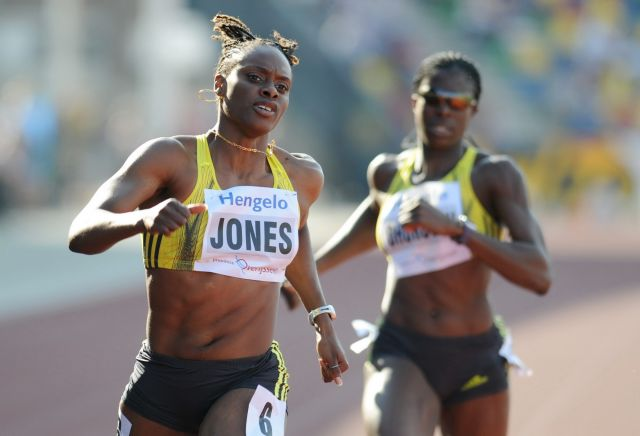
  Laverne Jones-Ferrette in 2009
- Tombi Bell (born 1979), former professional basketball player born in St. Croix.
- Aliyah Boston (born 2001), professional basketball player, born in St. Thomas.
- Livingstone Bramble (1960–2025), former professional boxing champion; born on St. Kitts & Nevis, raised on St. Croix.
- Jerry Browne (born 1966), professional baseball player from St. Croix.

C

- Jasmine Campbell (born 1991), alpine skier representing the Virgin Islands, born in St. John.
- John Campbell (skier) (born 1962), alpine skier competing for the U.S. Virgin Islands.
- Joe Christopher (1935–2023), first baseball player born in the territory to play in Major League Baseball.
- Horace Clarke (1940–2020), professional baseball player, born in Frederiksted, St. Croix.
- Callix Crabbe (born 1983), Major League Baseball Player born in St. Thomas.
- Midre Cummings (born 1971), professional baseball player, born in Christiansted.

D

- Nicholas D'Amour (b. 2001), Olympic archer from the U.S. Virgin Islands.
- Tim Duncan (born 1976), former professional basketball player for the San Antonio Spurs, born in St. Croix.
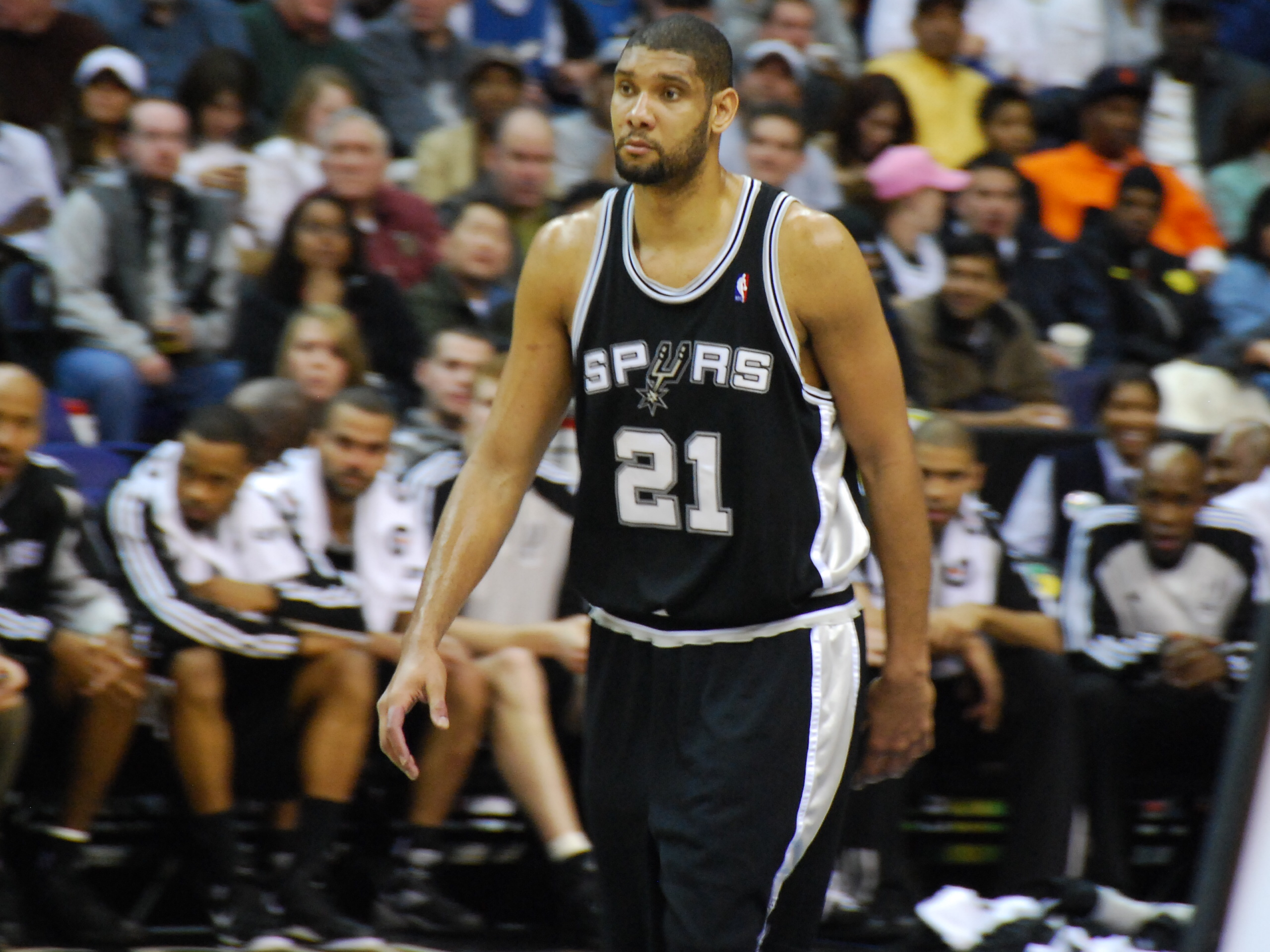
  Tim Duncan

G

- Emile Griffith (1938–2013), professional boxing champion, born in Solberg.

H

- Elrod Hendricks (1940–2005), professional baseball player and coach, born in Charlotte Amalie.
- Peter Holmberg (born 1960), Olympic sailor; as of 2016, the first member of the USVI Olympic Team to win an Olympic medal.

J

- John Jackson (born 1989), former Olympic boxer from the Virgin Islands, convicted on various charges.
- Julian Jackson (born 1960), former professional boxing champion, born in St. Thomas.
- Julius Jackson (born 1987), professional boxer, born in St. Thomas.
- LaVerne Jones-Ferrette (born 1981), professional sprinter and Olympian from the Virgin Islands.

N

- Milt Newton (born 1965), former professional basketball player; administrator for multiple NBA teams, born in St. Thomas.

P

- Calvin Pickering (born 1976), professional baseball player born in St. Thomas.
- Elmo Plaskett (1938-1998), baseball player from the US Virgin Islands.

S

- "Sugar" Ray Seales (born 1952), the only American boxer to win gold in the 1972 Summer Olympics, born in St. Croix.

T

- Valmy Thomas (1925-2010), first man from the Virgin Islands to play in the Major Leagues, from St. Croix.

== Educators ==
- Pamela Balash-Webber (1953-2020), diving instructor and ocean conservationist from St. Thomas.
- Olasee Davis, educator born in St. Thomas and working in St. Croix.
- Delta Dorsch (1915 - 2011), was an educator and preserver of cultural history of the U.S. Virgin Islands.
- Safiya George, sixth president of the University of the Virgin Islands (UVI).
- David Hall, president emeritus of UVI.
- Doris Jadan (1925 - 2004), environmentalist teacher, author and journalist from St. John.
- Orville E. Kean (1938 - 2025), mathematician and educator who served as president of the University of the Virgin Islands.
- Camille McKayle (born 1964), mathematician and Provost of the UVI.
- Alonzo G. Morón (1909 - 1971), educator and first Black president of Hampton Institute, born in St. Thomas.
- Jelani Nelson (b. 1984), American professor from St. Thomas.
- LaVerne E. Ragster (b. 1951), marine biologist and former president of the UVI.
- Malik Sekou (b. 1964), professor at the UVI.
- Erika J. Waters, former professor at UVI, founder of the Caribbean Writer literary journal.
- Edith L. Williams (1887-1987), educator and suffragist in St. Thomas.

== Entrepreneurs ==
- Sosthenes Behn (1882–1957), founder of the Puerto Rico Telephone Company and ITT Corporation, born in the Virgin Islands.
- Federico Blume (131 - 1902), engineer migrated in Peru, a pioneer of the submarine navigation.
- Stede Bonnet (1688 - 1718), buccaneer, active in the Virgin Islands.
- Edith Bornn (1922-2010) first woman to have a private law practice in St. Thomas.
- Annie de Chabert (1908 - 1976), businesswoman and civic activist in the U.S. Virgin Islands.
- Ella Gifft (1882-1964), suffragist and entrepreneur in St. Thomas.
- Jean Hamlin (died 1696), buccaneer active in the Virgin Islands.
- Casper Holstein (1877-1944), numbers racketeer and philanthropist born in Christiansted.
- William Kidd (c. 1645 – 1701), buccaneer, active in the Virgin Islands.
- Henry L. Kimelman (1921 - 2009), entrepreneur in the Virgin Islands and former ambassador.
- William Leidesdorff, (1810–1848), entrepreneur, born in St. Croix.
- Laurance Rockefeller (1910 -2004), wealthy heir who purchased two-thirds of St. John island for tourism and ecological preservation.
- Tempest Rogers (1672 or 1675–1704), buccaneer, active in the Virgin Islands.
- Bartholomew Sharp, (c. 1650–1702), buccaneer, active in the Virgin Islands.

== Historians ==
- Arnold R. Highfield (1940 - 2019), historian and professor known for his historical writing on the U.S. Virgin Islands.
- Agnes King (1919 - 2003), historic preservationist and gardener from the U.S. Virgin Islands.
- Turkiya Lowe (b. 1977), historian and public history scholar who worked in the U.S. Virgin Islands.
- Arturo Alfonso Schomburg (1874–1938), historian, writer, activist, namesake of the Schomburg Center for Research in Black Culture; born in Puerto Rico to a mother from St. Croix, attended school on St. Thomas.

== Medical professionals ==
- Ianthe Blyden (1899–1984), president of the Virgin Island Nurses' Association.
- Donna Christensen (b. 1945), physician and politician from the U.S. Virgin Islands.
- Cora LeEthel Christian, first native woman from the U.S. Virgin Islands to earn a medical degree.
- Sascha James-Conterelli, nurse-midwife from St. Croix.
- Catherine Alicia Georges (b. 1944), registered nurse, professor, and nonprofit executive
- Marcella Nunez-Smith, physician and scientist originally from the Virgin Islands.
- Albert Heinrich Riise (1810–1882), often referred to as A. H. Riise, was a Danish pharmacist and Rum manufacturer from St. Thomas in the Danish West Indies.
- Myrah Keating Smith (1908–1994), the only health provider on St. John for two decades.

== Musicians and dancers ==
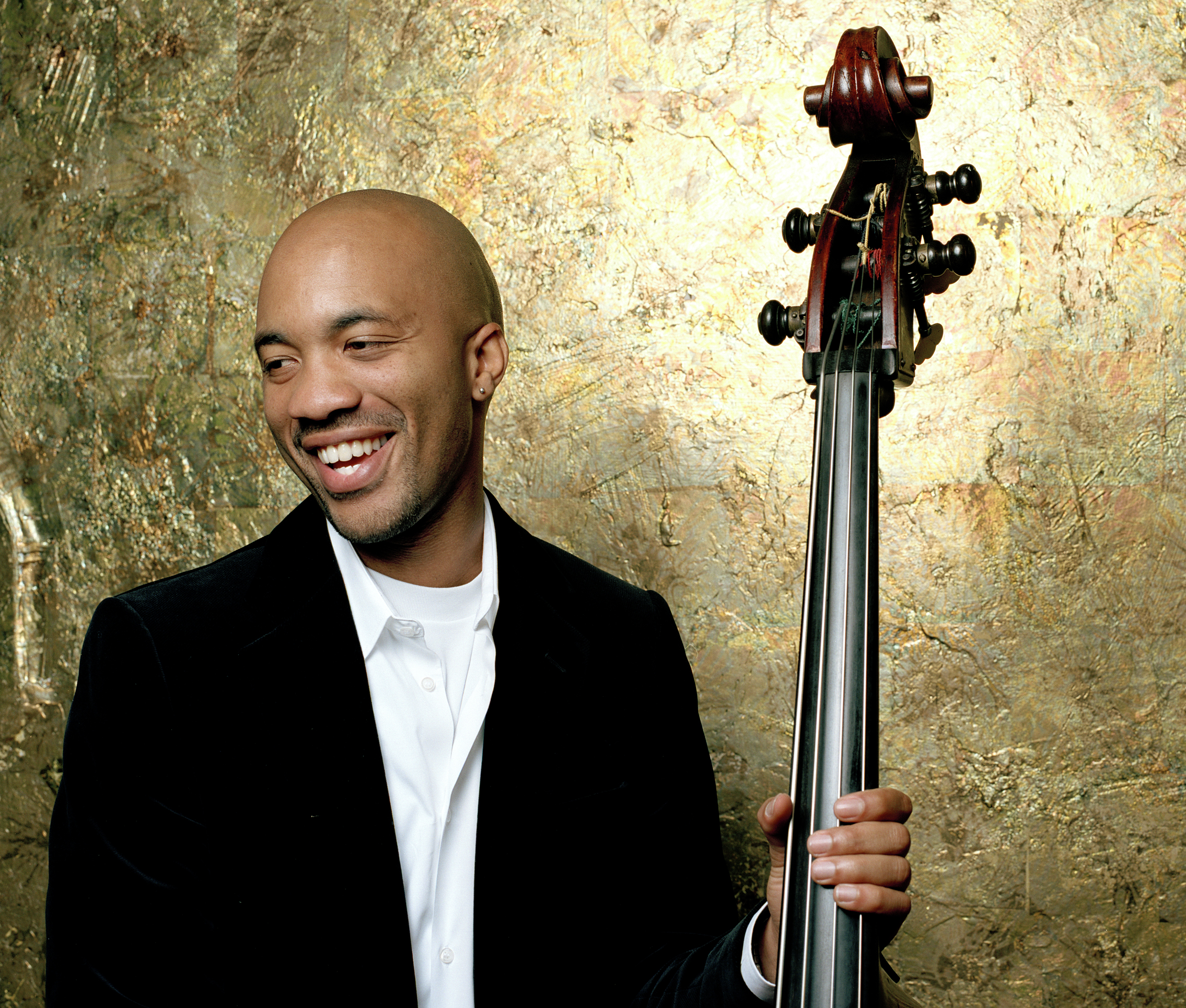
- Reuben Rogers in 2006.
  Alton Adams (1889–1987), musician, first black bandmaster in the United States Navy.
- Bennie Benjamin (1907–1989), composer, born in Christiansted, St. Croix.
- De Apostle, reggae musician born in St. Croix.
- Delyno Brown (born 1981), reggae artist from St. Thomas.
- Denis Charles (1933 - 1998), jazz drummer from St. Croix.
- Ismay Duvivier (1903 - 2004), dancer, entertainer and later a nurse; born in St. Croix.
- Charles Emanuel (1891-1979), educator, musician, composer, and community activist
- Vanessa Daou (born 1967), international singer-songwriter, dancer, writer, poet, grew up in the Virgin Islands.
- Norma Krasinski, singer and actress from the U.S. Virgin Islands.
- Jon Lucien (1942–2007), vocalist and musician; born on the island of Tortola and raised on Saint Thomas.
- Sylvester McIntosh (1934 - 2017), singer and bandleader from St. Croix.
- Midnite (band), roots reggae band from St. Croix.
- Rich Nice, rapper from St. John.
- Rock City, musical duo also known as R. City, from the Virgin Islands.
- Reuben Rogers (b. 1974), jazz musician from the Virgin Islands.
- Rashawn Ross, (born 1979), trumpeter, arranger, session musician and a member of the Dave Matthews Band. Born in St Thomas.
- Theron Thomas (born 1982), member of musical duo Rock City

== Political leaders ==
A

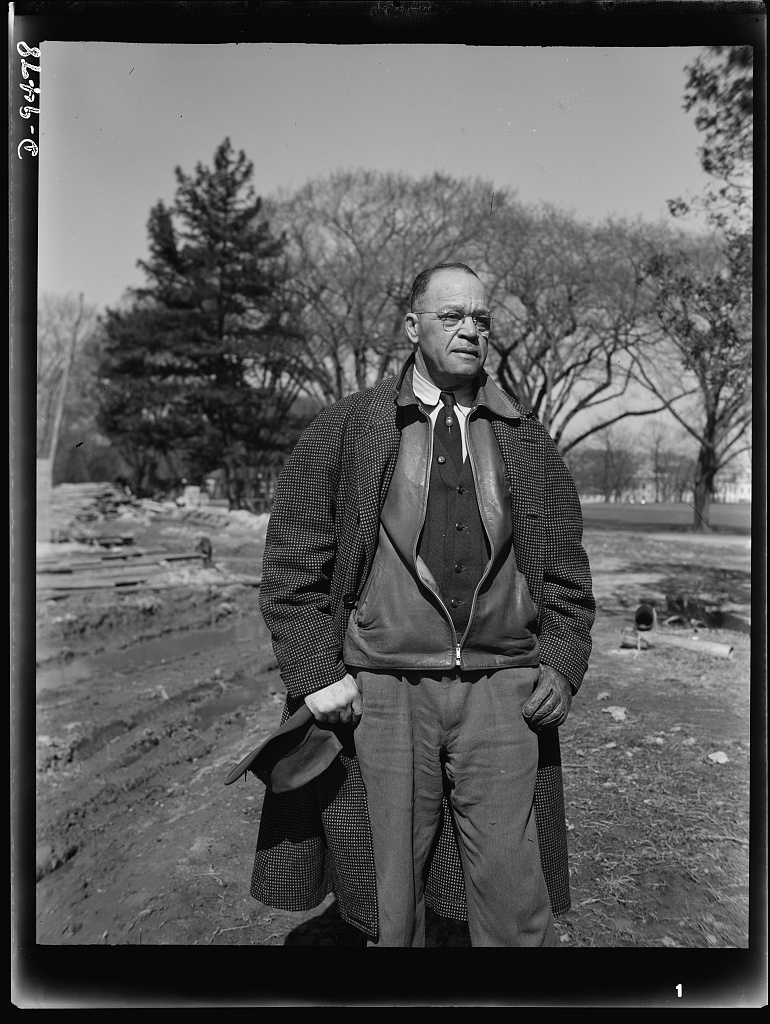
Archie Alexander, former governor of the US Virgin Islands

- Archie Alexander (1888–1958), mathematician, engineer, former Governor of the Virgin Islands.

B

- Samuel Baptiste (b. 1963), politician from the U.S. Virgin Islands.
- Judah P. Benjamin (1811–1884), first Jewish U.S. Senator; Secretary of State, Confederate States of America, born in St. Croix.
- Lorraine Berry (1949-2010), legislator from St. Thomas.
- Edward Wilmot Blyden (1832–1912), Liberian educator, writer, diplomat, and politician born in St. Thomas.
- Angel Bolques Jr., politician from the U.S. Virgin Islands.
- Bertha C. Boschulte (1906 - 2004), educator, women's rights activist and politician from St. Thomas.
- Julio Brady (1942 - 2015), judge and politician from the US Virgin Islands.
- Mario Brooks (b. 1971), police commissioner from the U.S. Virgin Islands.
- Albert Bryan Jr. (b. 1968), ninth governor of the U.S. Virgin Islands.

C

- Frank Rudolph Crosswaith (1892–1965), socialist and labor leader born in the Virgin Islands.
- Ansetta de Chabert (1908-1976), businesswoman and civic activist.
- Ralph de Magne de Chabert (1890-1955), civic leader, educator, editor, and administrator, born in Frederiksted, St. Croix.

D

- Eric E. Dawson (1937 - 2017), former U.S. Virgin Islands senator.
- Ron De Lugo (1930–2020), St. Croix politician and former candidate for governor.
- Francis J. D'Eramo (1959 - 2009), judge from the U.S. Virgin islands.
- Soraya Diase Coffelt (b. 1958), lawyer judge and former candidate for governor of the Virgin Islands.
- Lawrence William Cramer (1897 - 1978), first civilian lieutenant governor for the U.S. Virgin Islands.
- Adlah Donastorg Jr. (b. 1961), legislator and gubernatorial candidate from the Virgin Islands.

E

- Melvin H. Evans (1917 - 1984), first elected governor of the U.S. Virgin Islands.

F

- J'Ada Finch-Sheen, lawyer and attorney who served as the Attorney General of the US Virgin Islands.
- Ray Fonseca (politician) (b. 1959), legislator from the Virgin Islands.
- Gregory Francis (b. 1951), American politician, born in St. Croix.
- Novelle Francis, Jr, politician from the US Virgin Islands.
- Rothschild Francis (1891–1963), activist, civil rights leader, councilman and newspaper editor from the Virgin Islands.
- Victor O. Frazer (b. 1943), lawyer and politician from the Virgin Islands.

G

- Denise George (b. 1959), served as the attorney general for the U.S. Virgin Islands.
- Kenneth Gittens, politician from the U.S. Virgin Islands.
- Moses Gottlieb, from St. Croix, led an uprising on July 3, 1848 which forced the Danish government to abolish slavery.
- Clifford Graham, former member of the Virgin Islands legislature.
- Octavius Cato Granady (1885-1928), African American lawyer and politician, and Afro-Caribbean civil rights activist

H

- Alexander Hamilton (1755–1804), first United States Secretary of the Treasury, an American "founding father", economist, and political philosopher; born in Nevis, raised on St. Croix.
- Hubert Henry Harrison (1883–1927), orator, political activist
- William H. Hastie (1904–1976), jurist, lawyer, Governor of the Virgin Islands.
- Ulises Heureaux (1845–1899), former President of the Dominican Republic (mother born in Saint Thomas)
- Elsie Hill (1883-1970), moved to St Thomas in 1935, fought for women's suffrage in the Virgin Islands.
- Cora Richardson-Hodge, Anguillan politician born in St. Thomas.
- Henry Hughes Hough (1871 -1943), governor of the U.S. Virgin Islands.

I

- Roy Innis (1934–2017), African-American activist, civil rights leader

J

- D. Hamilton Jackson (1884–1946), journalist, labor leader, attorney, judge.
- G. Luz A. James (c. 1926 - 2006), was politician in the U.S. Virgin Islands, from St. Croix.
- Gerard Luz James (b. 1953), politician and former lieutenant governor of the U.S. Virgin Islands, born in St. Croix.
- Javan James Sr. (b. 1987), legislator from St. Croix.
- Marise James, legislator from St. Croix.
- John de Jongh Jr. (b. 1957), seventh governor of the U.S. Virgin Islands.
- J. Raymond Jones (1899–1991), political leader, humanitarian, born in St. Thomas.
- Hans Jonatan (1784 - 1827), former slave, soldier, farmer and trader from St. Croix.

K

- Cyril King (1921-1978), second elected governor of the U.S. Virgin Islands.
- Sumner Ely Wetmore Kittelle (1867 - 1950), naval officer, served as governor of the U.S. Virgin Islands.

L

- Antonio López de Santa Anna (1794–1876), President of Mexico
- Robert Morss Lovett (1870 - 1956), American writer, activist and Virgin Islands politician.
- Juan Francisco Luis (1940–2011), 24th Governor of the U.S. Virgin Islands.
- Sidney A. von Luther (1925 - 1985), American politician born in Charlotte Amalie on St. Thomas.

M

- Kenneth Mapp (b. 1955), American politician and eighth governor of the U.S. Virgin Islands.
- Gabriel Milan (c. 1631–1689), colonial governor
- Henry Millin (1923 - 2004), politician who served as lieutenant governor of the Virgin Islands.
- Robert A. Molloy (b. 1975), judge in the U.S. Virgin Islands.
- Alexander Moorhead (1945 - 2023), legislator in the U.S. Virgin Islands.
- Warren Mosler (b. 1949), entrepreneur and politician in the U.S. Virgin Islands.

O

- James O'Bryan Jr. (b. 1956), politician from the Virgin Islands.
- Athniel C. Ottley (1941 - 2022), politician, former lieutenant governor of the Virgin Islands.

P

- Christopher Payne (1845 - 1925), American who served as U.S. consul to St. Thomas.
- Ralph Moses Paiewonsky (1907 - 1991), governor of the Virgin Islands in the 1960s.
- Paul Martin Pearson (1871 - 1938), governor of the U.S. Virgin Islands.
- Barbara A. Petersen, politician in the Virgin Islands.
- Maekiaphan Phillips, indigenous rights activist and kasike of the Guainía Taíno Tribe in the Virgin Islands.
- Stacey Plaskett (b. 1966), politician from the U.S. Virgin Islands.
- Osbert Potter (b. 1956), politician in the US Virgin Islands.

R

- Vargrave Richards (b. 1950), politician from the US Virgin Islands.
- Tregenza Roach (b. 1959), current lieutenant governor of the US Virgin Islands.
- Ruby Rouss (1921-1988), first woman to be president of the Virgin Islands legislature, from St. Croix.

S

- Janelle Sarauw, politician from the US Virgin Islands.
- Roy Schneider (1939-2022), fifth governor of the US Virgin Islands.
- Ariel K. Smith, former Attorney General of the US Virgin Islands.

T

- Mary Thomas (labor leader) (c. 1848 -1905), labor leader on St. Croix.
- Carol Thomas-Jacobs (c. 1968/69), lawyer and acting attorney general for the U.S. Virgin Islands.
- Terence Todman (1926–2014), former U.S. ambassador
- Martin Edward Trench (1869 - 1927), navy officer and former governor of the U.S. Virgin Islands.
- Charles Wesley Turnbull (1935 - 2022), former governor of the U.S. Virgin Islands.

V

- Denmark Vesey (1767–1822), slave revolt leader
- Kurt Vialet (born 1964), politician from the US Virgin Islands.
- Peter Carl Frederik von Scholten (1784–1854), Governor-General of the Danish West Indies from 1827 to 1848

W

- Hannibal Ware, US politician and financier from the US Virgin Islands.

== Religious leaders ==
- Charles Warren Currier (1857 - 1918), Roman Catholic bishop born in St. Thomas.
- Edward Ambrose Gumbs, bishop of the Episcopal Diocese of the Virgin Islands.
- Thomas McCants Stewart (1853 - 1923), clergyman, lawyer and civil rights leader.

== Transportation ==
- Clifton Boynes Sr (1943 - 2025), boat captain, ferry operator, from the U.S. Virgin Islands.

== Writers, journalists, and publishers ==
B

- Margaret Hartman Markoe Bache (1770 - 1836), printer and editor born in St. Croix.
- Tobias Buckell (born 1979), science fiction and fantasy writer who grew up in the U.S. Virgin Islands.

C

- Barbara Christian (1943–2000), educator and writer from St. Thomas.
- Melvin Claxton (b. 1958) former journalist of the Virgin Islands Source.
- Kacen Callender (b.1989), writer from St. Thomas.
- Tara Conklin (b. 1971), author born in St. Croix.

H

- Robert Herrick (novelist) (1868 - 1938), novelist and politician, died in Charlotte Amalie.

J

- Doris Jadan (1925–2004), author and environmental activist; lived on St. John from 1955 until her death.
- Gloria Joseph (c. 1927 - 2019), writer, academic, educator, feminist from St. Croix.

L

- Audre Lorde (1934–1992), writer, feminist, civil rights activist; born in New York, died on St. Croix.

M

- Dora Richards Miller (1842 - 1914), American author born in St. Thomas.

O

- Elise Otté (1818 - 1903), linguist and translator who lived in St. Croix.

P

- Arona Petersen (1908-1995), author, chef and businesswoman from St. Thomas.

R

- Althea Romeo-Mark (b. 1948), writer and educator who grew up in St. Thomas, attended the University of the Virgin Islands.

S

- Nicole Sealey (b. 1979), poet born in St. Thomas.
- Adolph Sixto (1859-1930), writer, lecturer and amateur naturalist from St. Thomas.
- Karrine Steffans (born 1978), author

Y

- Tiphanie Yanique (born 1978), writer from the Virgin Islands.

== See also ==
- List of Eastern Caribbean people
- List of governors of the United States Virgin Islands
- List of United States Virgin Islands senators
- List of United States Virgin Islands suffragists
- Virgin Islands American
