= List of United States Virgin Islands suffragists =

This is a list of United States Virgin Islands suffragists, suffrage groups and others associated with the cause of women's suffrage in the United States Virgin Islands.

== Groups ==
- St. Thomas Teachers Association.
- Suffragist League.

== Suffragists ==
- Bertha C. Boschulte (St. Thomas).
- Ella Gifft (St. Thomas).
- Elsie Hill (St. Thomas).
- Eulalie Stevens (St. Thomas).
- Anna M. Vessup (St. Thomas).
- Edith L. Williams (St. Thomas).

== See also ==
- List of American suffragists
- Women's suffrage in the United States
