= St. Thomas-St. John School District =

School district in the United States Virgin Islands

St.Thomas-St. John School District
- Location: 1834 Kongens Gade, Charlotte Amalie, VI 00802
- Region served: Saint Thomas, U.S. Virgin Islands
- Affiliations: Public School System

St. Thomas-St. John School District is one of two school districts in the United States Virgin Islands, a territory of the United States. It is a division of the Virgin Islands Department of Education.

The district serves the islands of Saint Thomas and Saint John.

== Schools ==
=== High schools ===
St. Thomas

- Charlotte Amalie High School (Charlotte Amalie)
- Ivanna Eudora Kean High School (Red Hook)

=== K-8 schools ===
St. John

- Julius E. Sprauve School (Cruz Bay)

=== Middle schools ===
St. Thomas

- Bertha C. Boschulte Middle School (Bovoni)
- Addelita Cancryn Junior High School (Charlotte Amalie)

=== Elementary schools ===
St. Thomas

- Yvonne E. Milliner Bowsky Elementary School (formerly Peace Corps Elementary School)
- Leonard Dober Elementary School
- Gladys Abraham Elementary School (Formerly Kirwan Terrace Elementary School)
- Joseph A. Gomez Elementary School (Anna's Retreat)
- Lockhart Elementary School (Charlotte Amalie)
- Ulla F. Muller Elementary School (Charlotte Amalie West)
- E. Benjamin Oliver Elementary School (closed since Hurricane Irma)
- Joseph Sibilly Elementary School
- Jane E. Tuitt Elementary School (Charlotte Amalie)

=== Alternative Academy ===
- Edith Williams Alternative Academy
