= Ivanna Eudora Kean High School =

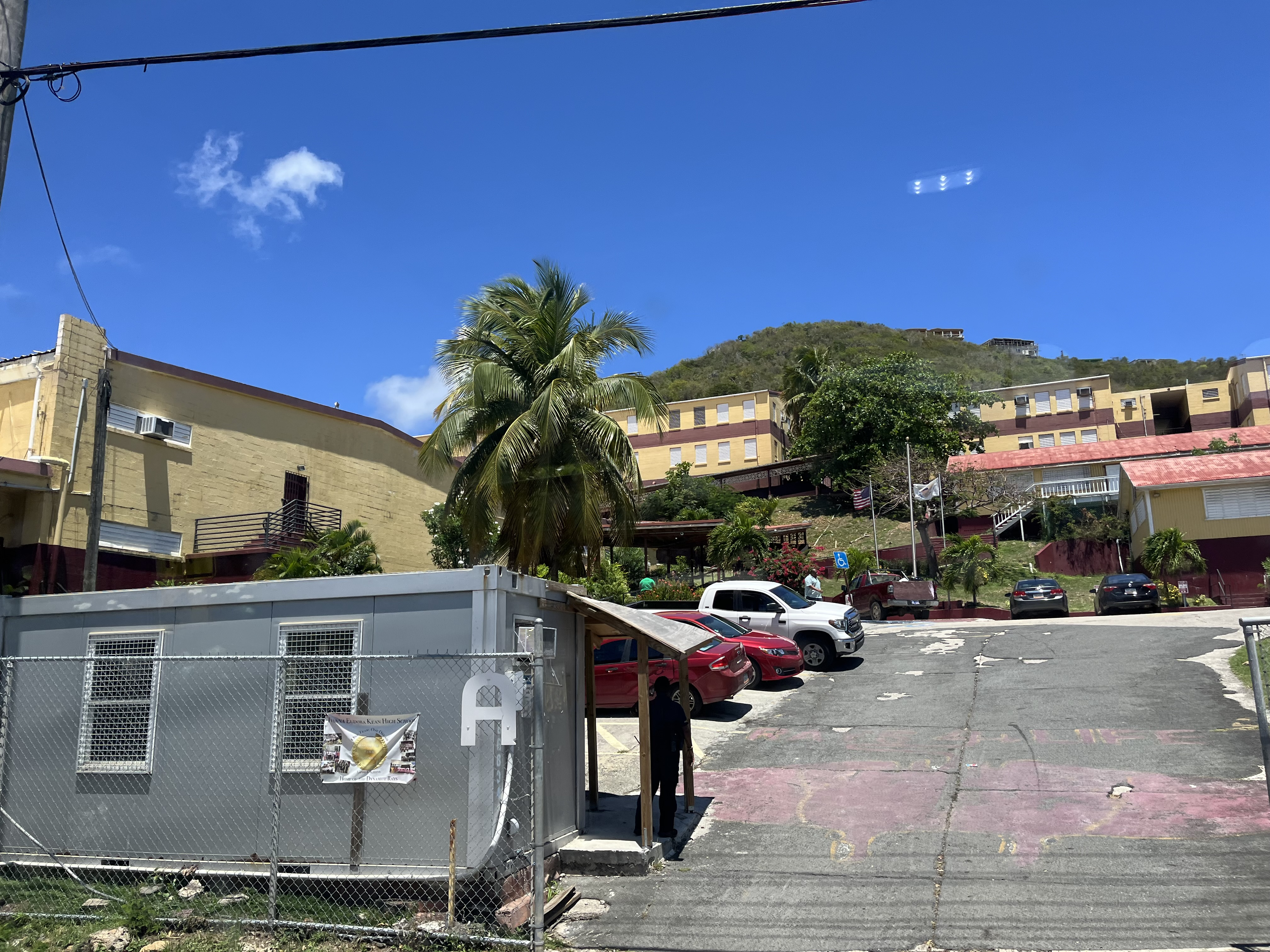
- IEKHS

Location
- 6501 Red Hook Plaza Suite 3 Saint Thomas (East End), United States Virgin Islands 00802; United States
- Coordinates: 18°19′30″N 64°51′13″W

Information
- Type: High School
- Motto: "Strive for Success"
- Established: 1971 (55 years ago)
- School district: St. Thomas-St. John School District
- CEEB code: 550085
- NCES School ID: 780003000015
- Principal: Sally Petty
- Faculty: Approximately 200
- Teaching staff: 75.00 (FTE)
- Grades: 9-12
- Enrollment: 680 (2019–20)
- Student to teacher ratio: 9.07
- Campus type: Suburban
- Colors: Maroon and gold
- Mascot: Devil Ray, variant of the stingray
- Accreditation: Middle States Association of Colleges and Schools (2019)
- Yearbook: The Ray
- Alumni: Nicholas "Nick" Friday

The Ivanna Eudora Kean High School, is one of the public high schools located on the island of St. Thomas in the United States Virgin Islands. It serves students that live in what is colloquially called the "country" or countryside area of the island of St. Thomas. The country designation refers to the East End, a portion of the Southside and Northside districts, and the Tutu District. I.E.K.H.S. also serves the student population on the island of St. John because it lacks a public high school.

While The Devil Rays compete against the Antilles Hurricanes, All-Saints Vikings, Saints Peter and Paul Jaguars, The Virgin Islands Montessori School Volts, Seventh Day Adventist Crusaders, and The Wesleyan Academy in the St. Thomas / St John District, they hold a long-standing and intense rivalry with the Charlotte Amalie High School Chickenhawks.

== History ==
It was established in 1971 as the Nazareth Bay Secondary School serving as a junior high and senior high school. In 1973, it became a senior high school with the construction of Bertha C. Boschulte Middle School. Its first graduation was also held in that same year. In 1975, it was renamed the Ivanna Eudora Kean High School to honor Ivanna Eudora Kean, an educator in the Virgin Islands for 52 years. The school's namesake died on February 27, 1979. Dr. Sharon McCollum served as principal of the school since August 2003 until 2014 when she accepted the position of Commissioner of Education under Governor Kenneth E. Mapp and Lt. Governor Osbert E.Potter Administration. Ms. Sally F. Petty assumed the Acting Principal's position for 6 months until Mr. Stefan V. Jürgen was placed as the Principal in the 2015-16 school year.

Principals	Term of Service
Neville Thomas William I. Frett Sara W. Connell Sinclair Wilkinson Lydia Simmonds-Lettsome Sharon Ann McCollum Sally F. Petty Stefan V. Jürgen Alicia Leerdam Sally F. Petty	1971-1984 1984-1988 1988-1995 1995-2001 2002-2003 (Acting Principal) 2003-2014 2015 (Acting Principal) 2015 - 2019 2019-2022 (Acting Principal) 2022-Current

== Stadium ==
The school's stadium hosts USVISF Premier League association football matches for clubs from Saint Thomas. It has also served as the home venue for the United States Virgin Islands national soccer team.

=== Gallery ===
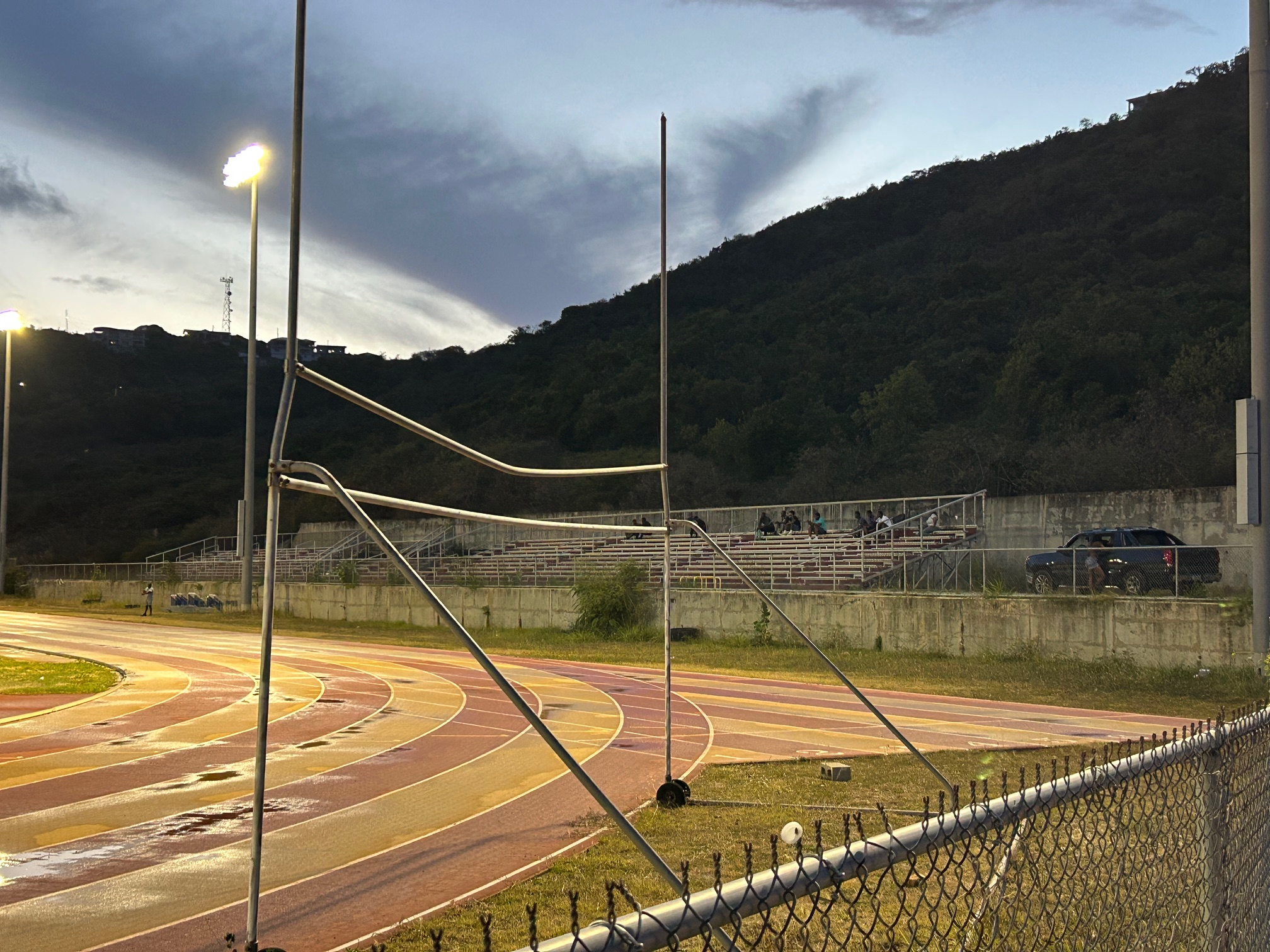

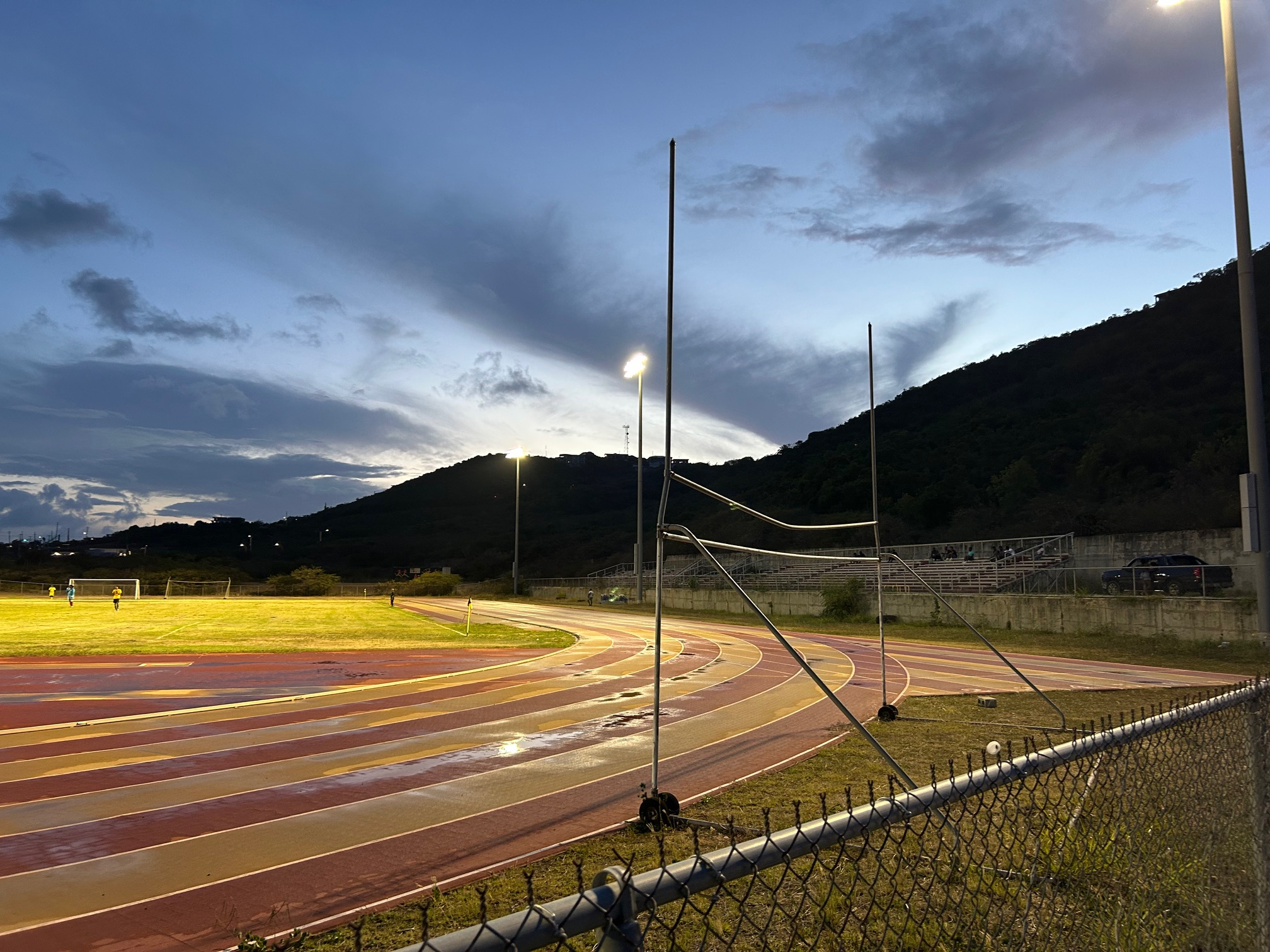

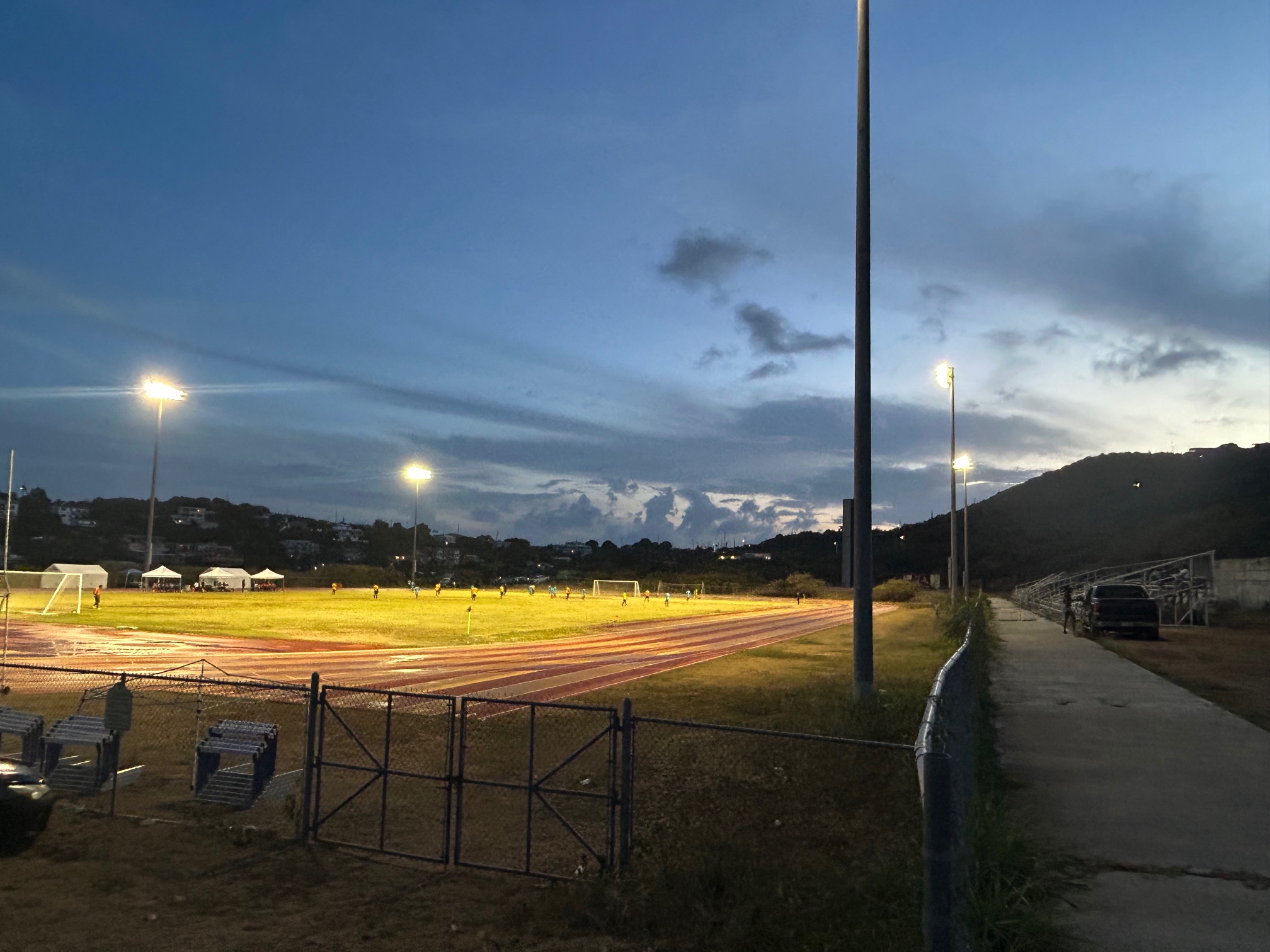

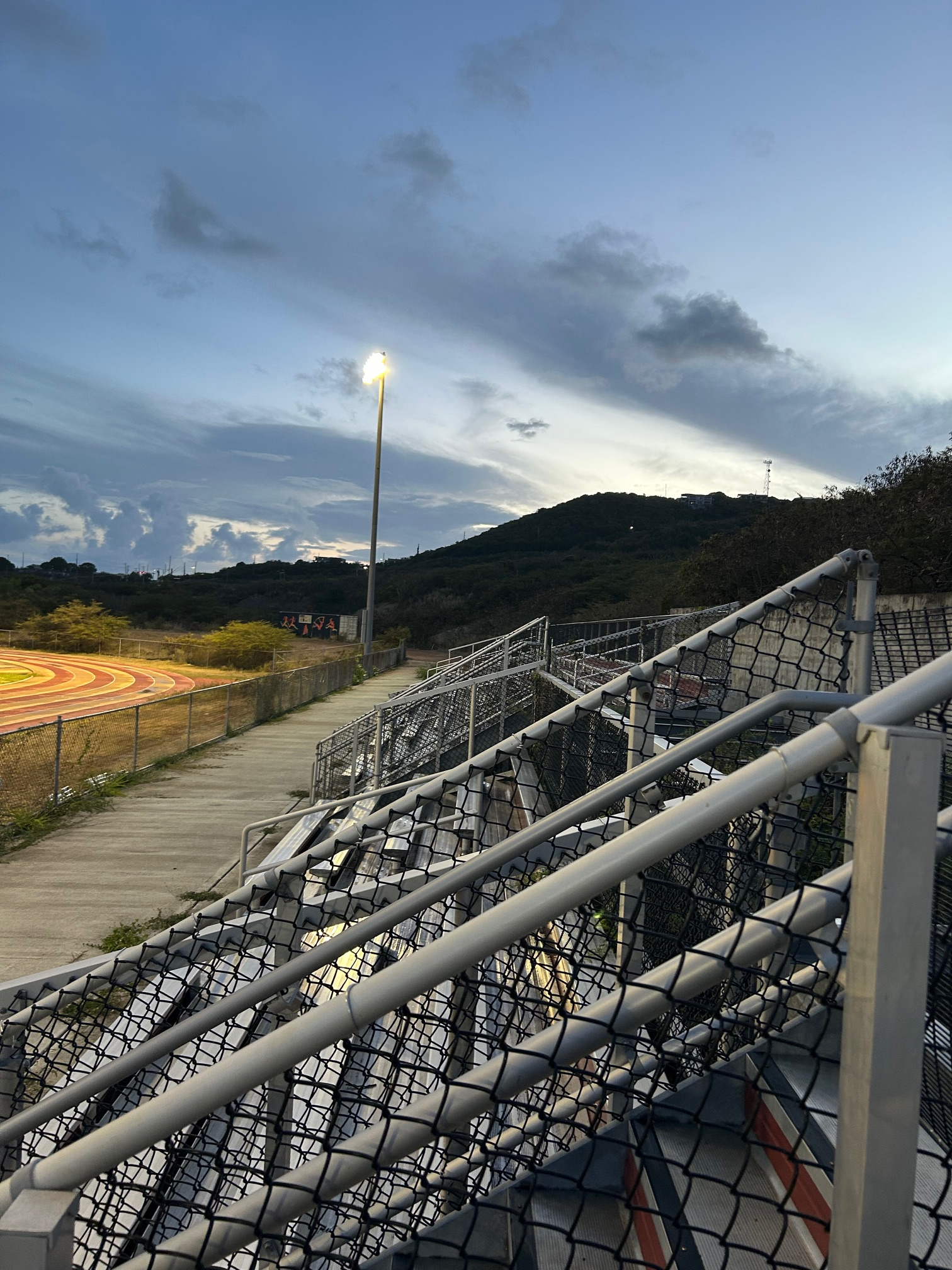

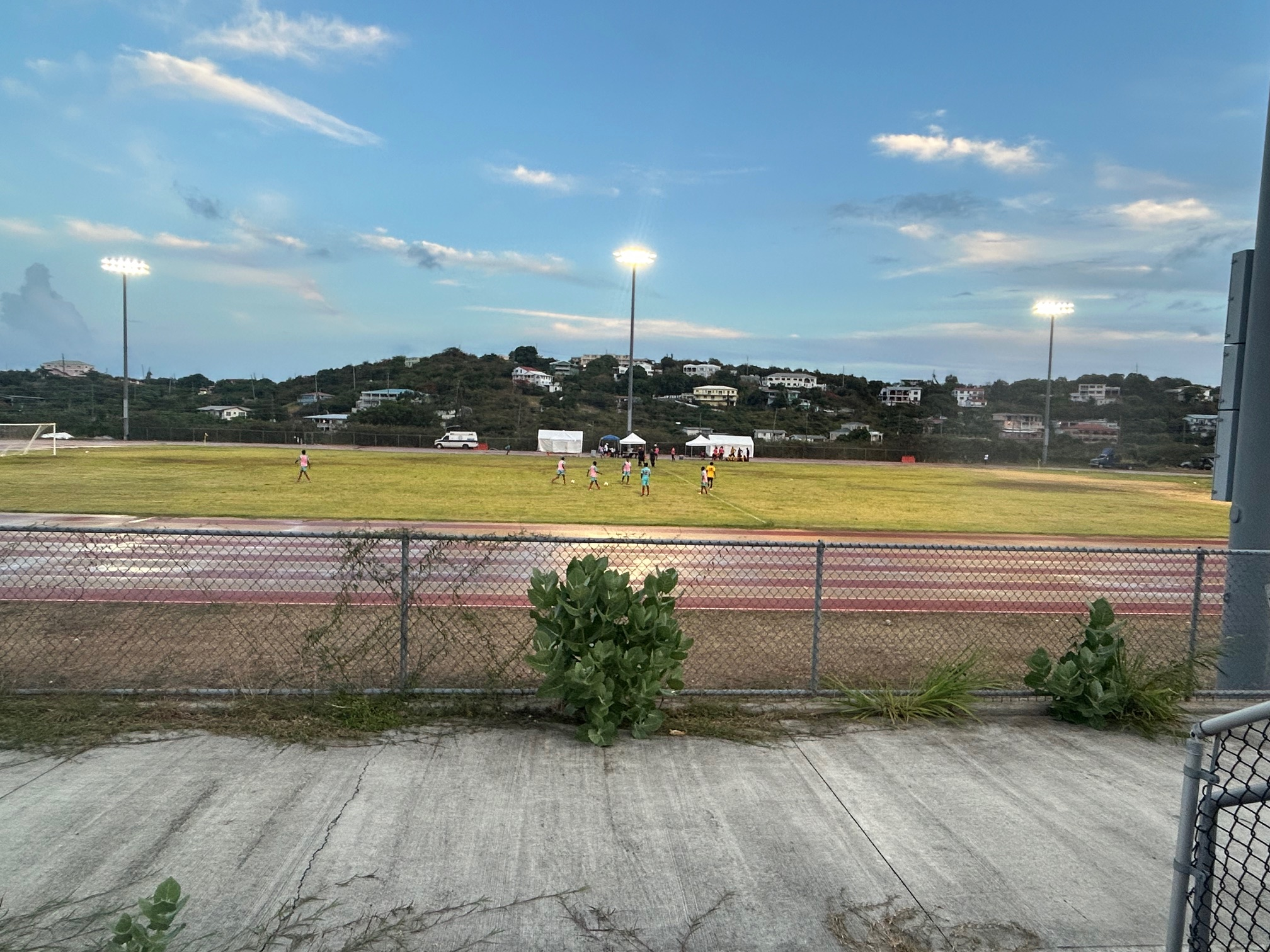

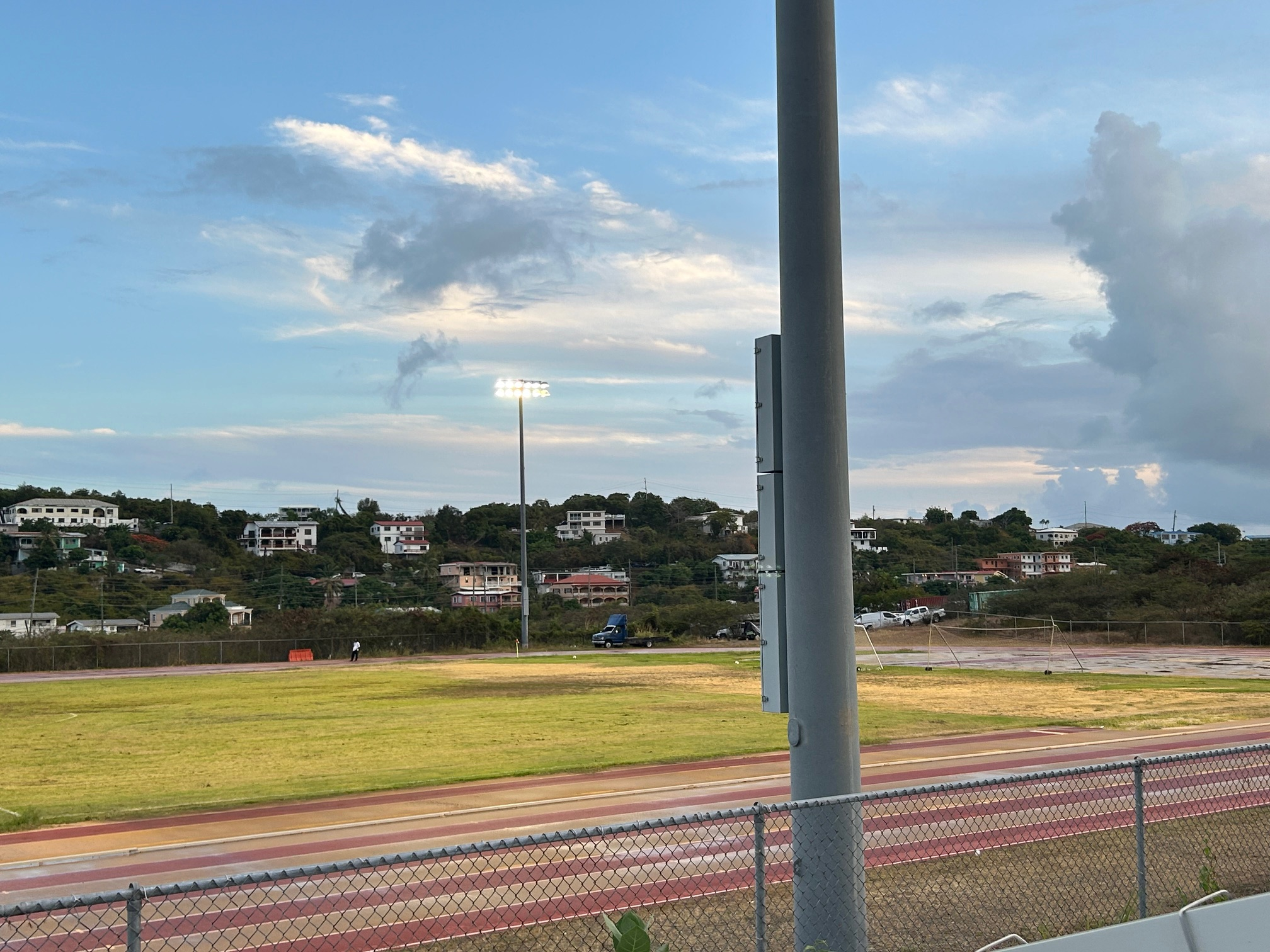

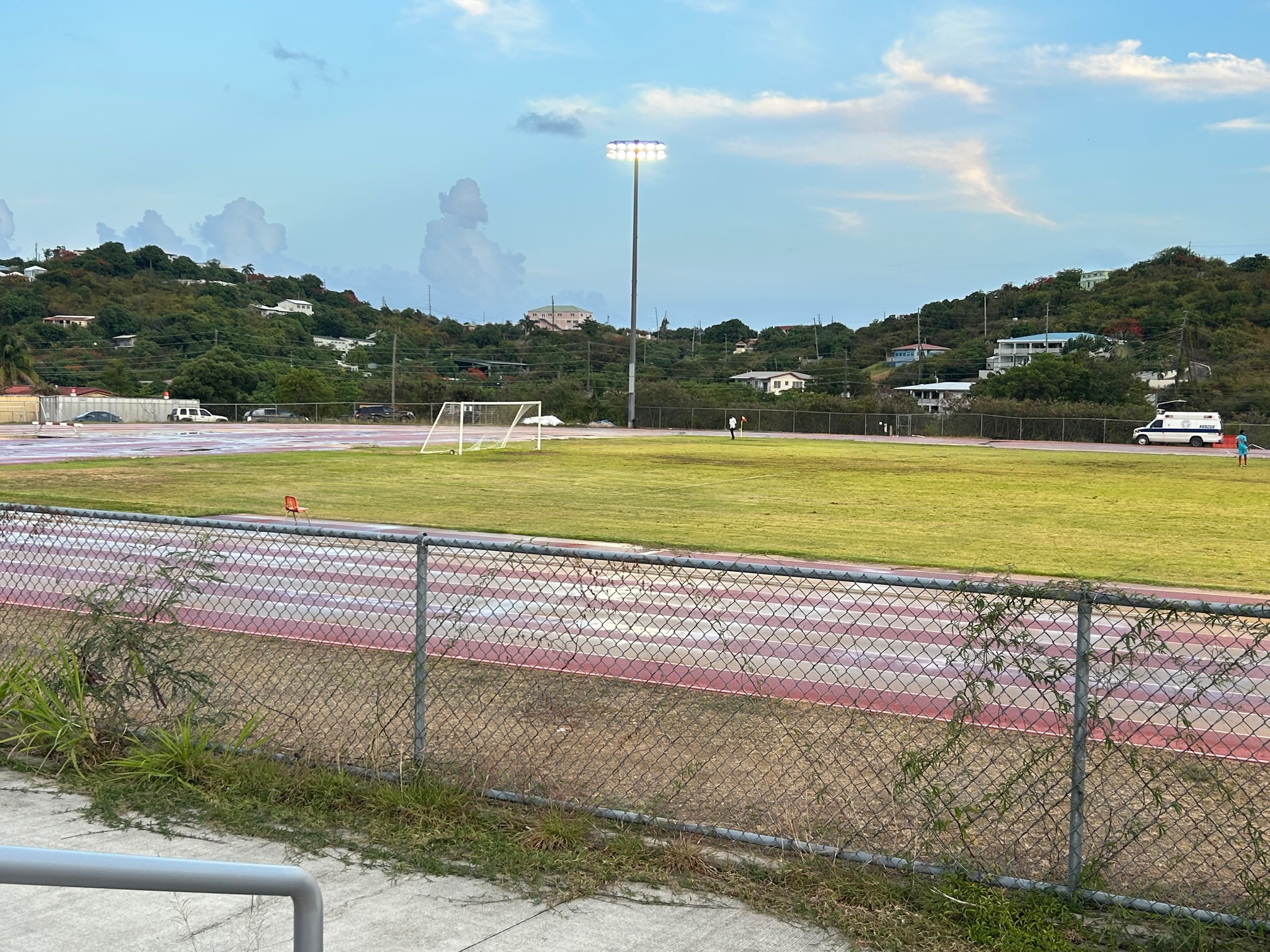

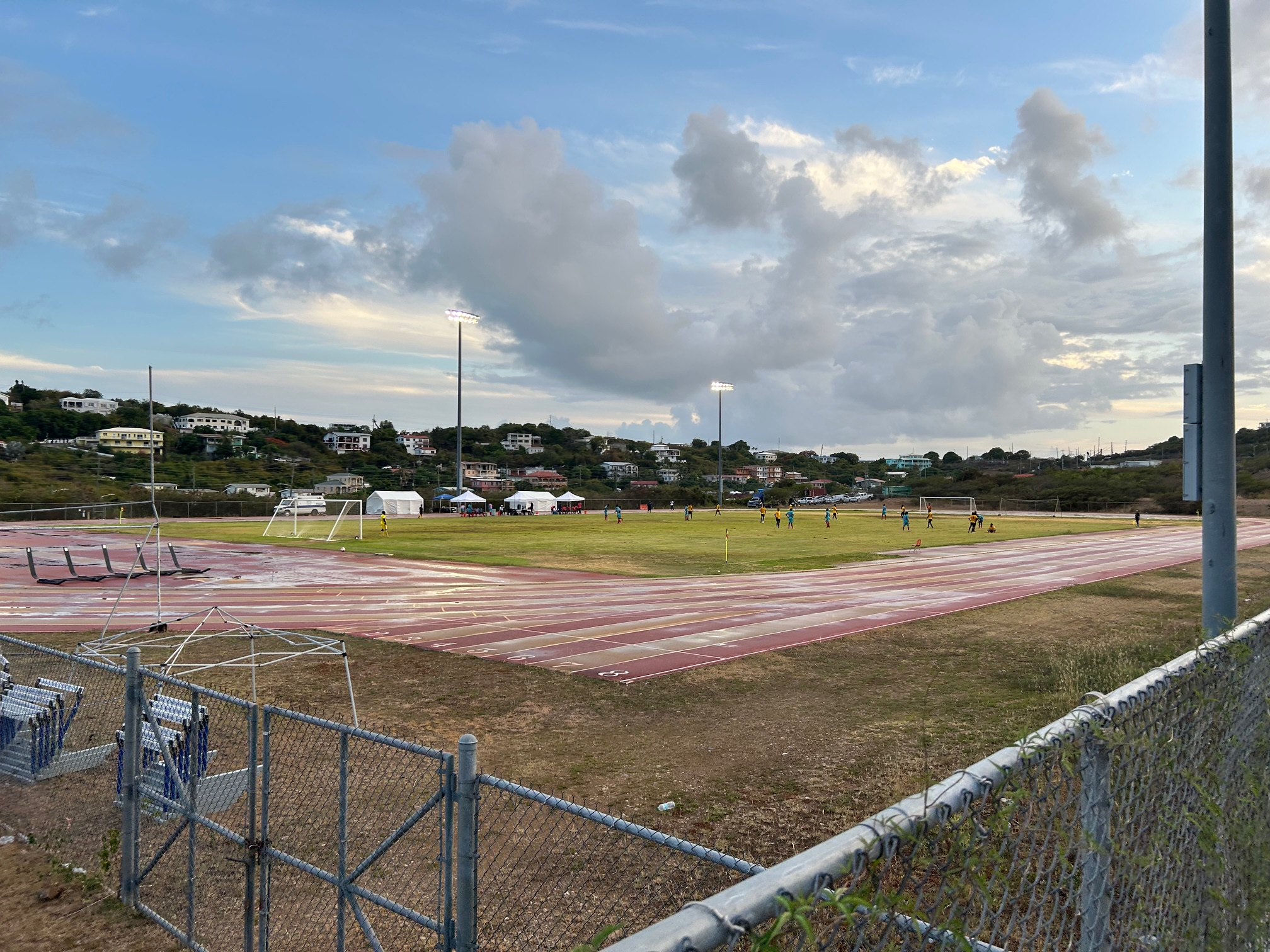

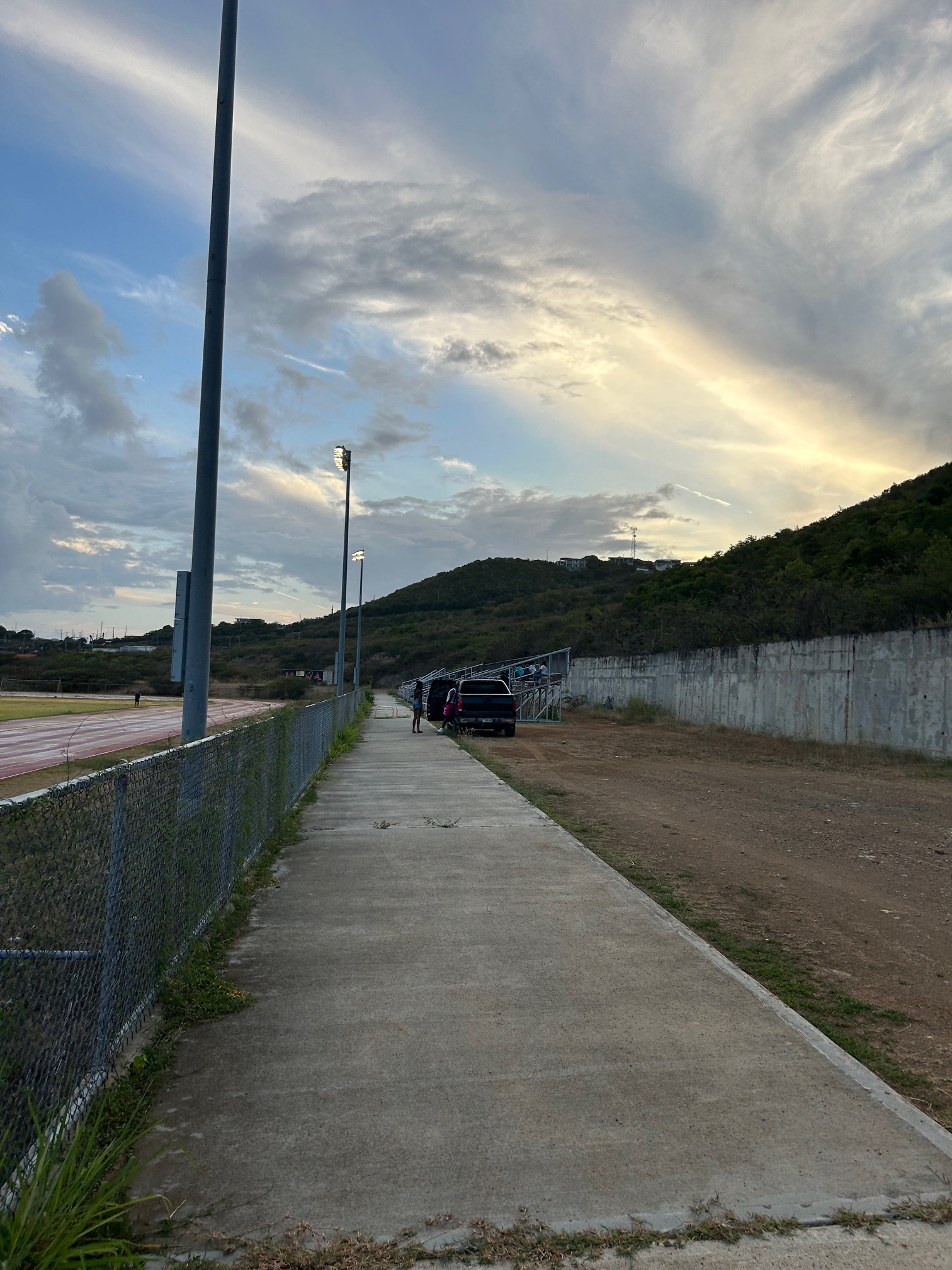

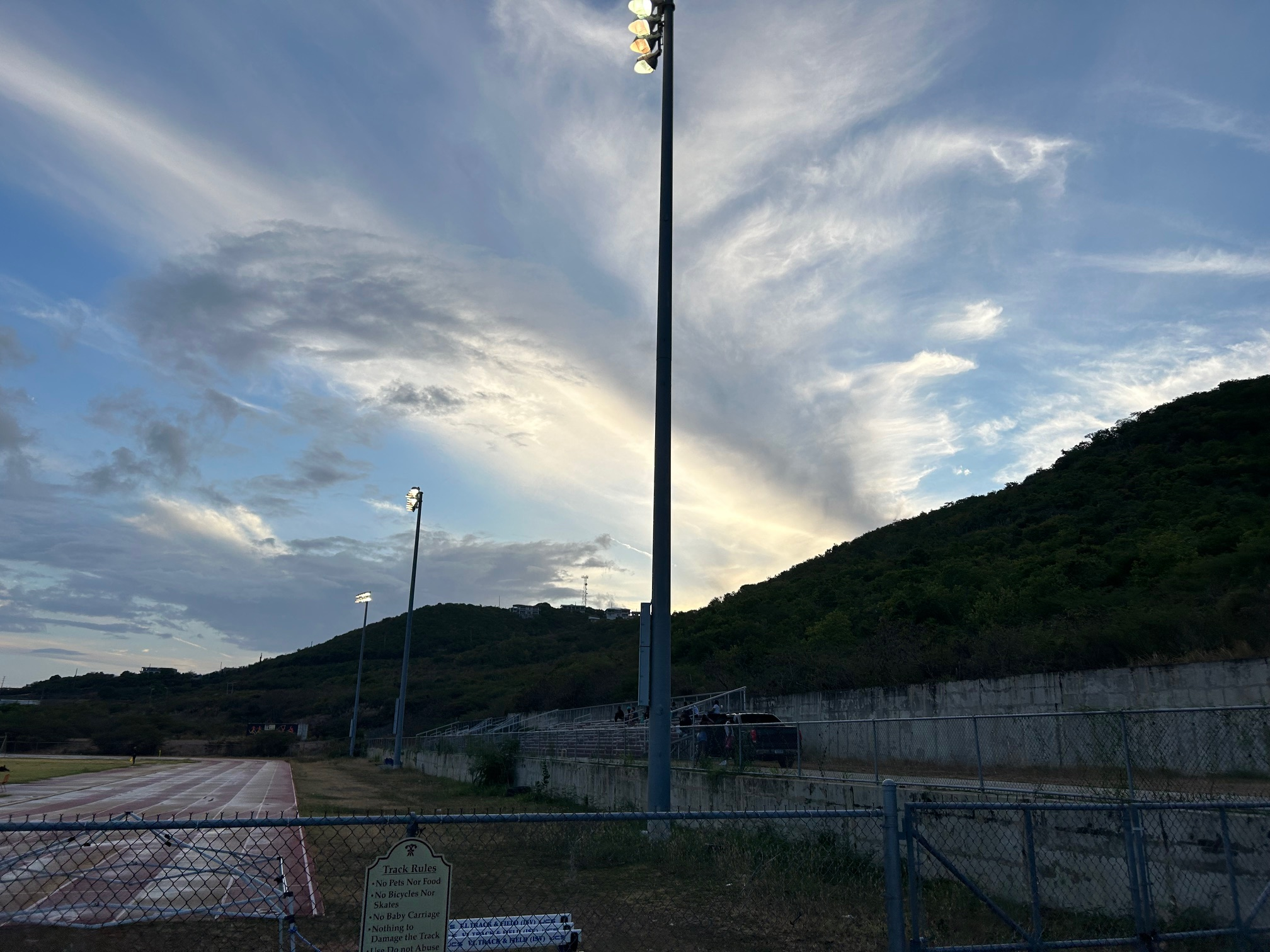
