= Bovoni, U.S. Virgin Islands =

Coordinates: 18°18′53″N 64°53′32″W

Bovoni is a settlement on the island of Saint Thomas in the United States Virgin Islands.

Bertha C. Boschulte Middle School is located in Bovoni, as is the Bovoni Landfill.
