= David Earle Maas =

American Virgin Islander politician

1st Lieutenant Governor of the United States Virgin Islands
- In office July 1, 1969 – February 20, 1973
- Governor: Melvin H. Evans
- Preceded by: Position established
- Succeeded by: Athniel C. Ottley

Personal details
- Born: April 14, 1914 Hamilton County, Ohio, U.S.
- Died: February 1, 2005 (aged 90) Sandy Ridge, North Carolina, U.S.
- Party: Republican
- Education: Chase College of Law

David Earle Maas (April 14, 1914 – February 1, 2005) was an American Virgin Islander politician. He served as the first lieutenant governor of the United States Virgin Islands from 1969 to 1973.

== Life and career ==
Maas was born in Hamilton County, Ohio. He attended Chase College of Law.

In 1969, Maas was appointed to the United States Virgin Islands lieutenant governorship. Maas was re-elected to the position in 1971 along with Governor Melvin H. Evans. He resigned in 1973 and was succeeded by Athniel C. Ottley.

Maas died on February 1, 2005, at his home in Sandy Ridge, North Carolina, at the age of 90.
