= Sascha James-Conterelli =

Inspired by her mother's path as a physician, Dr Sascha James-Conterelli has worked as a nurse-midwife in public and private healthcare settings since 2002. James-Conterelli has held board positions throughout New York and contributed to a CDC review on maternal mortality. While continuing her role as Program Director for Midwifery at New York University Rory Meyers College of Nursing, James-Conterelli has returned home, to the island of St. Croix, USVI, to bring her vision of quality maternal healthcare to life, despite limited resources. Her personal experiences and the statistics she observed continue to drive her and her colleagues to address systemic racism and implicit bias in perinatal care, while promoting respectful communication.

== Early life and education ==
After attending the Free Will Baptist and Good Shepherd Elementary Schools in St. Croix, she moved to Brooklyn, New York, her new home, which never quite felt like home. Besides commuting to St. Croix during every summer and break, attending Howard University for undergrad was where a little bit of home was - fellow Virgin Islanders. She obtained a Bachelor of Science in Nursing in 1996. She earned her PhD from New York University in 2012 after completing a childbirth education project aimed ar reducing elective deliveries.

== Career ==
It was at her first midwifery job at Rockland County, New York that James-Conterelli realized some factors that affected the quality of care of patients - race, geographic location, and level of education. The shift from midwifery to healthcare administration was put into effect after three years as a staff midwife, aiming to be more directly involved in positive changes in the maternal healthcare system. Through listening to the voices of healthcare providers, James-Conterelli and the group realized that they also played a role in further disadvantaging the disadvantaged.

James-Conterelli's accumulated position as Vice President of the Pequenakonck Elementary School Parent Teacher Organization (PTO) reminded her of her voice and impact on her community. In 2022, she continued to have affiliations as co-chair of Governor Andrew Cuomo's Maternal Mortality and Racial Disparities Task Force from 2018, and a member of his COVID-19 Maternity Task Force and New York State's Maternal Mortality Review Board.

During the fifth annual Black Maternal Health Week (BMHW) campaign, led by the founders; Black Mamas Matter Alliance, James-Conterelli conversed on Maternal Mortality, Racial Inequities, and Education and Health Care amongst black mothers and their families.

Through years of working in private and public healthcare systems in New York, James-Conterelli observed the statistic that a black, college-educated woman has a nine times higher maternal mortality rate than a white, high school-educated white woman even with countless accessible healthcare systems. St. Croix only having one, under-staffed and under-resourced hospital with drastically lower maternal mortality rates also raised a concern.

Eager to be a part of positive change, establishing Taino Whole Life Wellness in 2023, built rapport with expecting mothers amongst other Virgin Islanders in James-Conterelli's services. The in-progress partnership between the University of the Virgin Islands and New York University is her other big idea. Once successfully executed, studying anticipated healthcare providers in the VI would have access to NYU resources without being displaced or replaced by Americans to continue building the local workforce. Also, medical residents from NYU would have the opportunity to go to the VI to gain a new experience in a new cultural and environmental setting. James-Conterelli also plans to provide this opportunity to Virgin Islanders attending Howard University.
