= Orville E. Kean =

Orville E. Kean ( October 13, 1938 – January 19, 2025) worked as an educator, mathematician and public health executive in the Virgin Islands. He is best known for serving as president of the University of the Virgin Islands (UVI) and for his contributions to the development of healthcare and higher education in the U.S. Virgin Islands. His educational system and public service work created long-lasting effects which institutions named after him use to commemorate his legacy.

== Early life and education ==
Orville E. Kean was born in 1938 in St. Thomas to Edith Joseph Kean and Charles Kean. He graduated from Charlotte Amalie High School after attending Dober Elementary School.

He completed his Bachelor of Science degree in mathematics at Lincoln University in 1959 and then earned his Master of Science degree at the University of Michigan in 1961. He later obtained a Doctor of Mathematics from the University of Pennsylvania in 1971.

== Career ==
=== Public Health and Medical Contributions ===
Orville E. Kean helped the development of United States Virgin Island's healthcare systems. His work enabled the establishment of public health facilities which delivered better medical care to residents and resulted in improved health results.

=== University of the Virgin Islands ===
At the University of the Virgin Islands (UVI) Kean worked as president, inaugurated on March 16, 1990, while leading the school through its institutional growth process. He helped the university establish new academic programs during his time as president while developing the institution's regional community presence. The university honored him with president emeritus status because of his contributions which continued to shape educational development in the Virgin Islands.

=== Legacy and Hours ===
The Orville E. Kean campus at the University of the Virgin Islands is named in his honor which recognizes his contributions to the institution and its community. His work continues to be acknowledged through community memorials along with ongoing institutional recognition.

== Death ==
Kean died at 86 years old on January 19, 2025 at his St. Thomas residence.
