= Doris Jadan =

Virgin Islander environmentalist and author

Doris Carmer Jadan (June 18, 1925 – December 20, 2004) was an environmentalist teacher, author, and journalist in the U.S. Virgin Islands.

== Career ==
Jadan was born in 1925, in Tuscaloosa, Alabama. She graduated from Tulane University in Louisiana.

After taking a vacation to the U.S. Virgin Islands, she moved there permanently in 1955, settling in Cruz Bay, Saint John.

She began working as a schoolteacher on the islands, first at the Bethany School and then at the Julius E. Sprauve School after it opened in late 1955.

Jadan was an early environmental activist and conservationist on the island. She testified before Congress about pollution on Saint John in the 1960s. In 1970, she founded the Environmental Studies Program at the Sprauve School, writing that her aim was the "direct exposure of young Virgin Islanders to a unique Westindian cultural and natural heritage in order to increase awareness of and sensitivity to the changes that threaten the total V.I. environment."

She also was involved politically and administratively in the establishment and growth of Virgin Islands National Park, spoke out against privatization of the Water and Power Authority, and assisted in naturalist studies of local fauna.

A persistent community activist, Jadan opposed overdevelopment on the island. She also set a precedent for registering nontraditional vehicles on Saint John when in the 1990s she petitioned the police to let her officially register her golf cart, which she had initially registered as a motorcycle in the late 1970s.

=== Writing ===
As part of her work on the Environmental Studies Program, Jadan wrote the book A Guide to the Natural History of St. John in 1971. She also published several Virgin Islands cookbooks, some of which were co-written with her husband.

Jadan worked as a newspaper columnist for several publications including the Virgin Islands Daily News, the Tradewinds, and the St. John Times. Her Daily News column "A Child’s Eye View of the Virgin Islands" encouraged children to help preserve the islands' environment as well as their cultural traditions. She herself assisted with efforts to preserve Virgin Islands Creole; in his 1981 Creole dictionary What a Pistarckle! the Virgin Islands historian Lito Valls describes Doris Jadan as the "nen" (godmother) of the project.

== Personal life and death ==
Doris married Ivan Jadan in 1951. He was a Russian opera singer who left for the United States before the couple settled in Saint John. After his death in 1995, she memorialized him in two biographies and created a museum to him in her home. The couple had no children.

Ivan and Doris Jadan were friends with J. Robert Oppenheimer and his wife, Kitty, during the Oppenheimers' time on St. John in their later years.

She died on December 20, 2004, at age 79. In the media, friends and neighbors suggested that the stress of Jadan's last preservationist fight, against the construction of the Grande Bay development in front of her home, contributed to her rapid health decline.

== Selected works ==
- A Virgin Island Cookpot Calypso (1965)
- A Guide to the Natural History of St. John (1971)
- The Virgin Islands Cook House Cook Book (1972)
- V.I. Cuisine With Ivan and Christine! (1979)
- Codeword: Freedom (2001)
