= Paul Martin Pearson =

Governor of the United States Virgin Islands

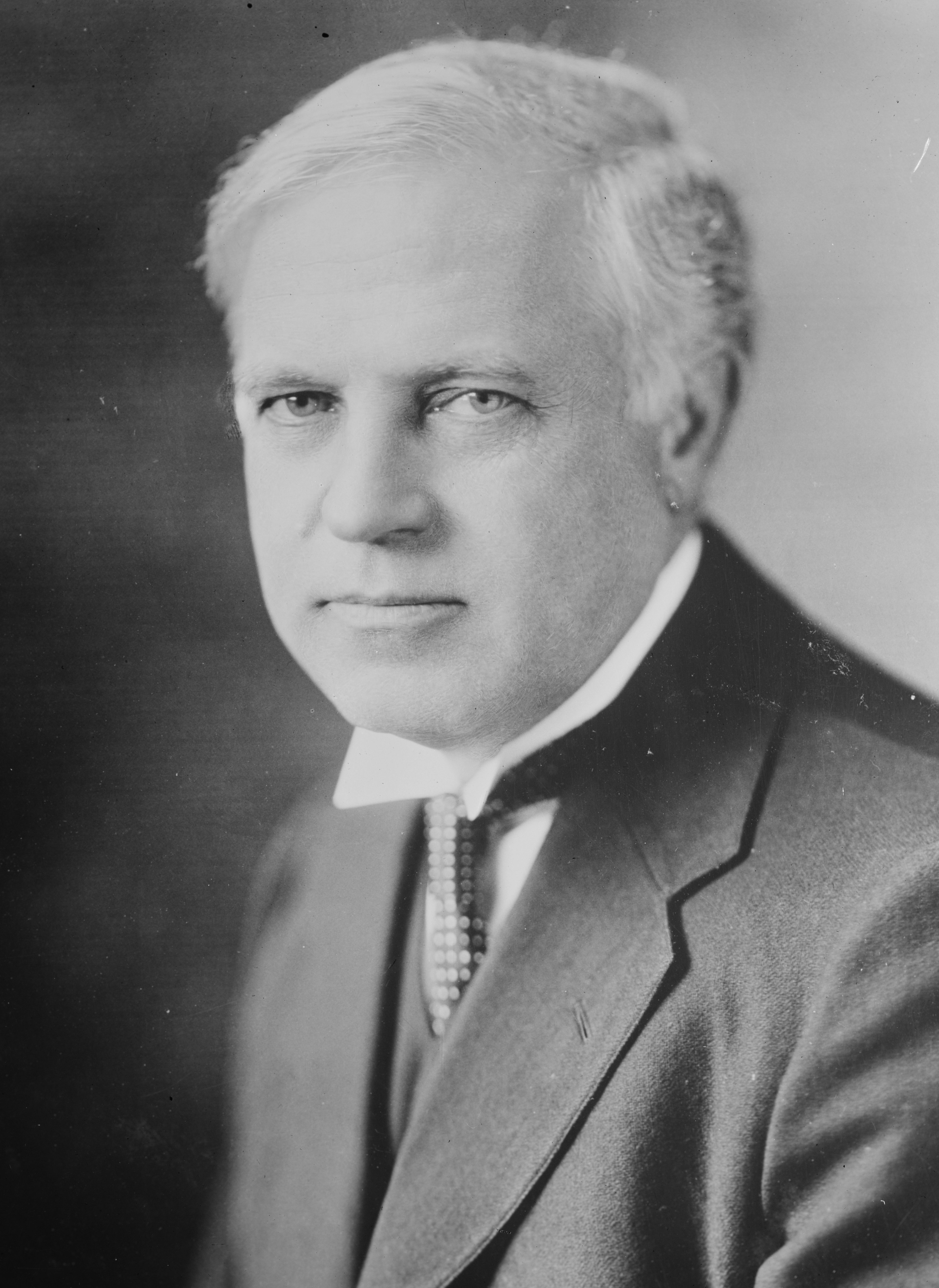
- Born: October 22, 1871; Litchfield, Illinois, U.S.
- Died: March 26, 1938 (aged 66); San Francisco, California, U.S.
- Occupations: Author, college professor
- Spouse: Edna Wolfe (m. 1896)
- Children: 3, including Drew

Paul Martin Pearson (October 22, 1871 – March 26, 1938) was a college professor, author, editor of journals, a Quaker, and the first civilian Governor of the United States Virgin Islands.

Pearson was born in Litchfield, Illinois. He attended Baker University in Baldwin City, Kansas, for his Master of Arts degree. In 1907 he was listed as one of the co-creators of Lyceumite & Talent magazine along with Louis J. Alber.

In 1909, he obtained his doctorate at Northwestern University and did some teaching there, before moving to Swarthmore, Pennsylvania and becoming a professor of Public Speaking at Swarthmore College. He wrote several books on public speaking and was an editor of the quarterly magazine "The speaker". He was also a major advocate of the Chautauqua movement in the US and founded the Swarthmore Chautauqua Association. Besides this he served as a speaker for the American Red Cross.

During World War I, he was responsible for the YMCA education programs in United States Army cantonments.

In 1896, he was married to Edna Rachel Wolfe Pearson (1874-1942), with whom he had four children, the oldest son being Drew Pearson, the well-known newspaper columnist and radio host.

== Governor of the Virgin Islands ==
In 1931, Pearson was appointed by President Herbert Hoover to be the first civilian Governor of the United States Virgin Islands. His new government, inaugurated March 18, 1931, was given $763,000 ($8.5 million in inflation-adjusted 2005 dollars) to try and shore up the islands' finances which were badly hurt by Prohibition. (The primary export had been rum.) They were also given the task of replacing all military-government officials with new civilian ones, a task which they were required to complete within the first six months. President Hoover visited the Virgin Islands (and Puerto Rico) as a show of support for the new civilian administration.

=== Herbert Brown denouncement ===
Less than a year after taking office, friction developed between the Governor and Herbert D. Brown, the chief of the Bureau of Efficiency. Brown had previously endorsed Pearson for the position, but by June 1931, he had requested to Hoover and the Department of the Interior that Pearson be replaced. This dispute was in large part financial. Under the military government, Brown had operated a quasi-civilian government in St. Croix since 1928, using money allocated to that purpose by Congress (for an "efficiency investigation"). Under the civilian government, this budget reverted to the new Governor. While Pearson largely implemented Brown's existing programs, he was no longer given direct authority. Pearson was also criticized for cronyism, including creating positions in his government (such as "Director of Adult Entertainment") which were given to friends from Pennsylvania. (Pearson rebutted that the positions were to help native morale.) On August 4, the Department of the Interior announced that Pearson would not be ousted from his position.

Financial problems also plagued Pearson during his time as governor as the US government was providing $200,000 annually for aid. In November 1932, he proposed to Congress that the islands be allowed to export rum again, but only to foreigners so as not to violate Prohibition. However, this became moot when the 21st Amendment was ratified the following year.

Pearson continued to be unpopular with the locals, especially after passing a law which taxed all imported products from the United States at 5%. On October 19, 1933, the populace of the Virgin Islands voted in a popular referendum whether or not to ask President Franklin D. Roosevelt to withdraw him. Ninety-eight percent of those voting favored the removal of Pearson from office. In February 1934, Pearson declared personal bankruptcy, in large part due to debts incurred while working with his Chautauqua organization in Pennsylvania.

=== Investigations ===
In November 1934, a scandal erupted as Pearson's executive assistant, Paul C. Yates was fired by Secretary of the Interior Harold L. Ickes for "disloyalty" and "insubordination" and ordered him to return to Washington, D.C., for an investigation. Instead, Yates immediately resigned his position and traveled to Washington to meet with committees from both houses of Congress. He alleged to Congress that Ickes had been "outrageously deceived" by Pearson and that Pearson had been covering up scandals and mismanagement. Congress dispatched Ernest Gruening, the chief of the Bureau of Insular Affairs, Division of Territories and Island Possessions to the islands to investigate. Gruening found no mismanagement in his investigation. (Critics have pointed out that Gruening worked for Ickes and that he may not have been an unbiased investigator.) Despite this, on February 28, 1935, Congress voted to start their own independent investigation, to be led by Millard Tydings, a Senator. The Senate hearings continued, but President Roosevelt appointed Lawrence William Cramer as the new Governor.

In 1935, Pearson returned to the mainland to work for the new United States Housing Authority. On February 28, 1938, he suffered a stroke while on a business trip to California to urge passage of a law to permit public housing in that State. He died a month later.

Preceded by Waldo A. Evans	Governor of the U.S. Virgin Islands; 1931–1935	Succeeded by Robert Herrick (Acting Governor)
