= Annie de Chabert =

USVI businessperson and activist

- Born: February 11, 1908; Christiansted, Danish West Indies
- Died: 1976 (aged 67-68); U.S. Virgin Islands

Ansetta de Chabert (also known as Annie Muckle de Chabert, Annie de Chabert Clarke, Annie de Chabert, or simply Miss Annie) (February 11, 1908–1976), was a United States Virgin Islands businesswoman and civic activist.

de Chabert sold a significant amount of her family land to Hess Oil and Chemical for an oil refinery in 1955, negotiating face-to-face with owner Leon Hess. With some of the money, she invested and brought the Sunny Isle Shopping Center to St. Croix. A member of the Democratic Party, she was made National Committee Woman from 1967 to 1972. She was also elected to and served on the Virgin Islands Board of Education as the chair from 1964 to 1970 and was active in several community organizations. She died of a stroke in 1976.

She was married first to Ralph de Magne de Chabert Sr., a local civil servant, farmer, and real estate investor. After his death, she married Reverend Clarke, the vicar of St. John's Episcopal Church in Christiansted. After her death she was honoured by Resolution 778, March 1, 1976, of the Virgin Islands legislature, which commemorated her "lifetime of human warmth, noble pursuits and good works throughout the Virgin Islands community". In 2005, she was one of 13 women inducted into the Virgin Islands Women's Hall of Fame.
