= Ralph de Magne de Chabert =

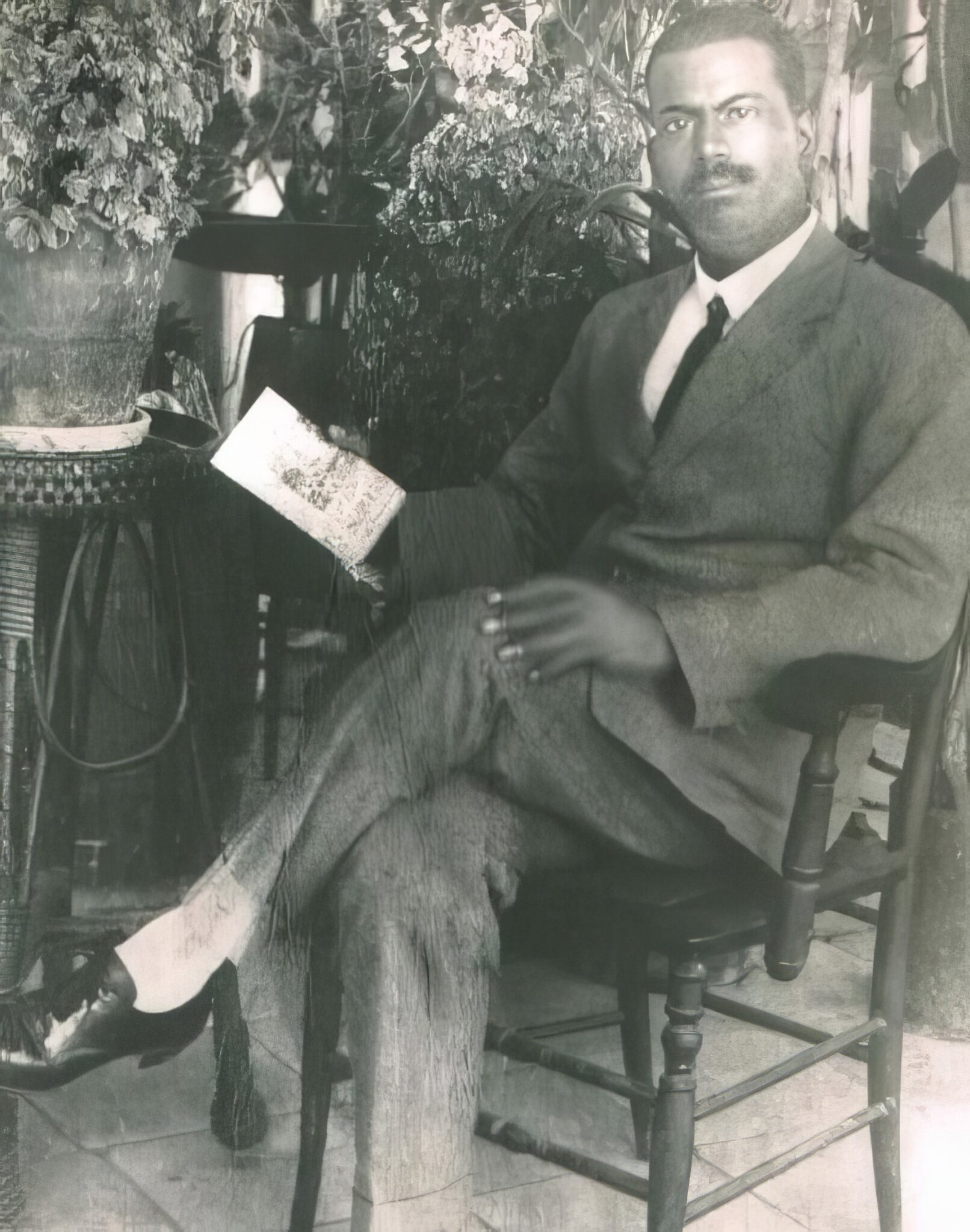
Ralph de Chabert (1890-1955)

Ralph D. de Magne de Chabert (1890–1955) was an Afro-Caribbean community leader, journalist, publisher, farmer, legal advisor, and political activist.

== Biography ==
Ralph de Chabert, was born in Frederiksted, Saint Croix, Danish West Indies, the son of Louis de Chabert and Laura de Chabert.

=== Life and education ===
He studied Journalism and Legal Studies through the La Salle Extension University, accredited by the National Home Study Council and the State of Illinois.

The St. Croix Labor Union was founded on November 1, 1915, by David Hamilton Jackson, with Ralph deChabert as Vice President and C.R.T. Brow as the bonded and certified treasurer. During Jackson's absence, de Chabert led the labor union, and with Octavius Granady, led an unsuccessful strike of sugar plantation workers in 1921. The failure of this strike contributed to a bitter falling out between Hamilton Jackson and de Chabert.

de Chabert was the founder and editor of the St. Croix Tribune, a daily newspaper that was published six days a week, between 1922 and 1937. He was also one of the founders of the Saint Croix Chamber of Commerce, serving as its first president, and he was a founder of the Saint Croix Democratic Party.

The St. Croix Tribune played an important part in the debate over the introduction of the VI Corp. Due to the collapse of the sugar industry and dire economic conditions in the Virgin Islands, in 1934, President Franklin D. Roosevelt proposed the formation of a "VI Corp" to purchase the unprofitable sugar plantations and collectivize them with the goals of "(a) Make available additional land for homesteading; (b) Make available additional money for building houses on the subsistence plan; (c) Provide aid for new industries organized on the cooperative basis;" according to Governor Paul Martin Pearson. Using seed money from the federal government, the VI Corp would break up the sugar plantations into five to 10-acre plots for homesteaders, as well as build a modern centralized sugar factory and rum distillery, with profits to be reinvested in "adult education, nursery schools, homesteading, and improved housing” among other benefits to Virgin Islanders.

Suspicious after hundreds of years of exploitation by colonial powers, Virgin Islanders vigorously opposed this proposal at first. Through editorials in the St. Croix Tribune, de Chabert was a strong voice for those who feared that this drastic proposal would strip the native Virgin Islanders of the few avenues to wealth available to them. They were also insulted by these (in the words of a letter to the editor) "experiments in paternalism" by Roosevelt's think tank of faraway mainlanders. The labor unions, which had accumulated significant lands during the collapse of the plantations, were also concerned by this proposal and wanted a seat at the table. However, despite prolonged opposition by the small moneyed class of the Virgin Islands, the VI Corp was forced through, and by October 1934, there were celebrations when the sugar factory resumed operation. In the end, the VI Corp was agreed to have been an unqualified success, erasing unemployment, promoting universal prosperity, and funding social programs for decades.

From 1937-8, de Chabert served as legal advisor to the Virgin Islands government, during which time he introduced the Homestead Act which granted adult heads of families, public land for a minimal filing fee. This act allowed thousands of Virgin Islanders to become homeowners at an affordable price.

In later life, he became a dairy farmer and landowner, and continued to serve in government as an elected official responsible for the tax assessment of all property throughout the islands, and as a tax administrator.

=== Marriage and children ===
Ralph de Chabert married Ansetta Muckle (1908–1976), an entrepreneur from Frederiksted who later become well known as a civic activist in the Virgin Islands. They parented six children: Juan de Chabert, Austin de Chabert Sr., Ralph A. de Chabert, MD, Mario de Chabert, JD, Shirley de Chabert Highfield, PhD., and Rita de Chabert Schuster.

=== Death ===
Ralph D. de Magne de Chabert died in Christiansted, Virgin Islands, on February 6, 1955. He was 65.

== Legacy ==
The Ralph DeChabert Collection of Virgin Islands and Caribbean documents, initiated by donations from the family of Ralph DeChabert, is located at the Albert A. Sheen Campus of the University of the Virgin Islands (UVI). It includes books, government documents, microfilm and microfiche recording the history and culture of the Virgin Islands and also the broader Caribbean region.
