= Urania P. Cummings =

Caribbean artist (1889–1978)

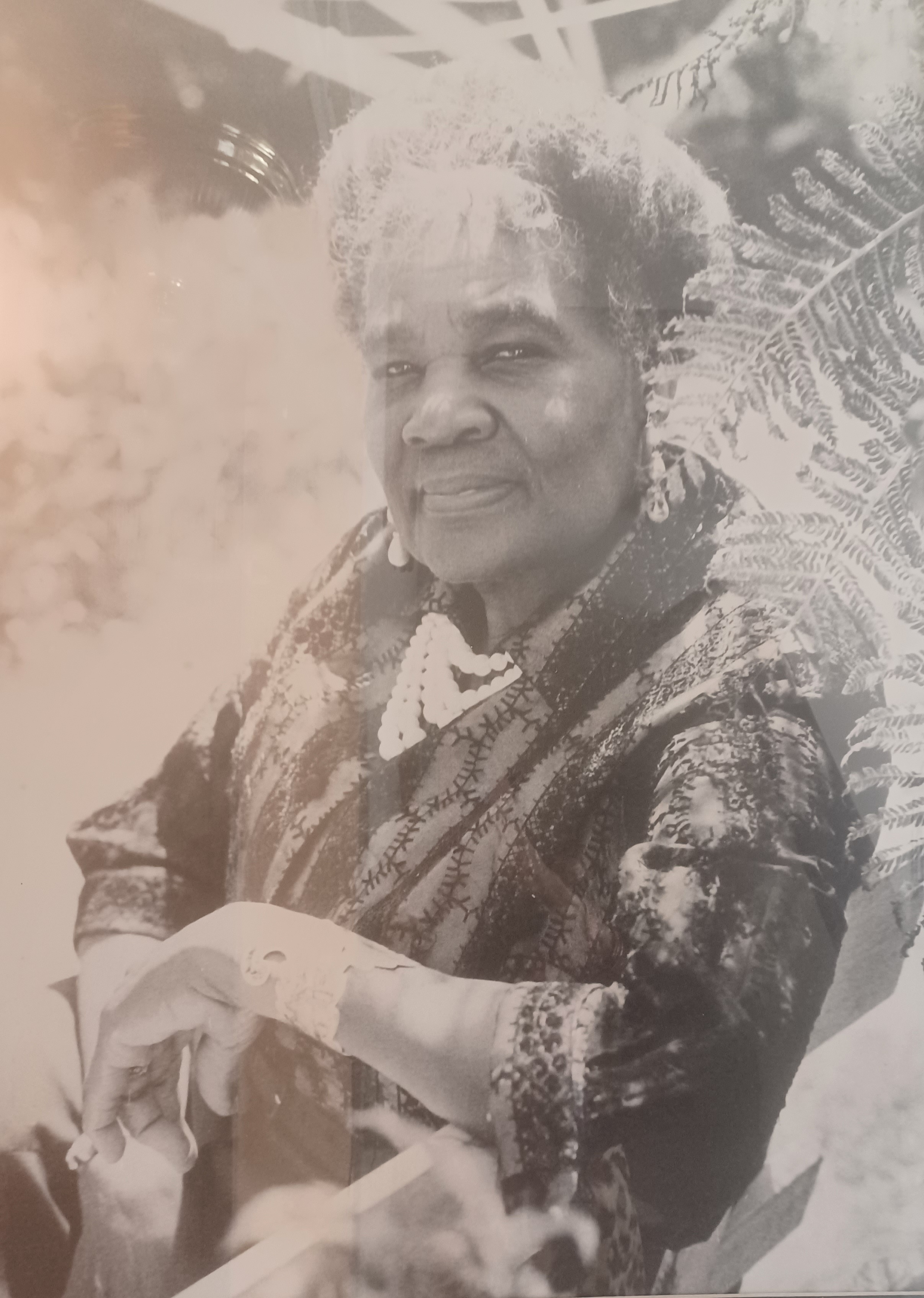
- Born: April 21, 1889; St. Thomas, Danish West Indies
- Died: March 18, 1978 (aged 88); Berkeley, California
- Occupations: Painter, artist, educator

Urania Prince Cummings (1889 - March 18, 1978) was an American painter born in the Danish island of Saint Thomas. She is documented as being an early West Indian pioneer settler in San Francisco and the San Francisco Bay Area. She was an artist, painter, ceramist, lecturer, poet, civic leader, and educator for decades.

Before studying art and becoming an artist Cummings raised her three children and grandchildren.

== Biography ==
Urania Prince Cummings was born in Saint Thomas, U.S. Virgin Islands in 1889. She was a student at Nisky School in Saint Thomas. She returned to Nisky years later, and gave a one-woman show in the classroom where she was scolded for drawing, and not studying. One of Cummings' childhood memories in school is reciting the poem by George Pope Morris called "The Woodsman Spare That Tree".

During World War I, she moved to New York. In 1922, she moved to San Francisco, California. While in California, Cummings attended United Negro Improvement Association (UNIA) meetings. The (UNIA) was founded by Marcus Garvey.

She died on March 18, 1978 and was buried in Colma, California.

== Career ==
Cummings studied art, public speaking, and started painting after raising her children at the age of 65. Her primitive style paintings feature life and scenes from the Virgin Islands and Northern California. In 1970, she became a member of the Oakland Art Association. It was noted that in a 1972 and in 1974, in the news that Cummings was the Bay Area's oldest practicing Black painter.

She lectured on art at California State University at Hayward and Laney College.

=== Exhibitions ===
In 1965, she had a "successful show in her home" in the Bay Area. January 20, 1975, at the House of Representatives in Washington, D.C., Urania Cummings granddaughter, Sharelle Cummings, hosted an exhibit of four of her paintings. In 1981, she had an exhibition titled "Be all you can be" in the Oakland Museum. The exhibition was from January 24 to March 8, 1981.

In 1999, Urania Cummings work was part of "One Hundred Years of Artists" exhibit in Berkeley, California.

Her paintings depict daily life that she experienced growing up in St Thomas, Virgin Islands; cooking, eating, washing under palm trees. She did ceramics and crocheted.

Cummings acrylic painting, "Grandmother's Rocking Chair," was gifted to the American Folk Art Museum in New York City.

== Quotes ==
"Berkeley used to be like a big family," Mrs. Cummings recalled. "Everybody seemed to get along nicely together because I think everybody owned something and we—and we had pride in what we owned.

== Memberships ==
- California State Federation of Colored Women's Clubs
- African Cultural Society of San Francisco (teacher-painting and crafts)
- Berkeley Coop Art Association in Berkeley
- African American Historical and Cultural Society
- Arts West Association in Berkeley
