= Athniel C. Ottley =

American Virgin Islander politician

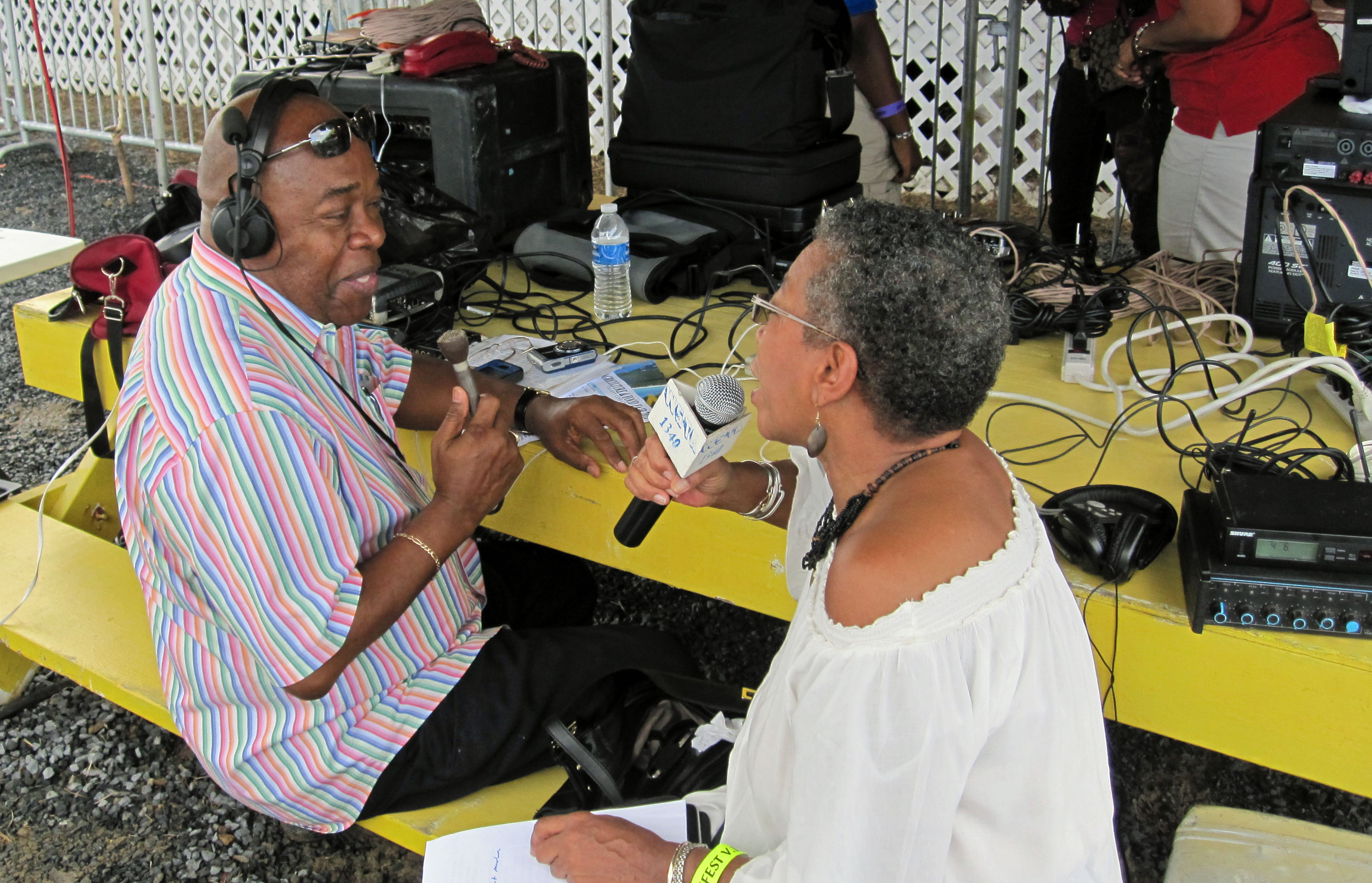
- Ottley (left) with Donna Christensen, 2012

Member of the Virgin Islands Legislature
- In office 1971–1973
- In office 1979–1981

2nd Lieutenant Governor of the United States Virgin Islands
- In office April 5, 1973 – January 6, 1975
- Governor: Melvin H. Evans
- Preceded by: David Earle Maas
- Succeeded by: Juan Francisco Luis

Personal details
- Born: November 19, 1941 Saint Thomas, U.S. Virgin Islands
- Died: February 10, 2022 (aged 80) Fort Wayne, Indiana, U.S.
- Party: Democratic; Republican

Athniel C. Ottley (November 19, 1941 – February 10, 2022) was an American Virgin Islander politician. He served as the second lieutenant governor of the United States Virgin Islands from 1973 to 1975.

== Life and career ==
Ottley was born in Saint Thomas, U.S. Virgin Islands.

In 1970, Ottley was elected to the Virgin Islands Legislature, serving until 1973. In the same year, he was appointed to the United States Virgin Islands lieutenant governorship, succeeding David Earle Maas. He served until 1975, when he was succeeded by Juan Francisco Luis. In 1978, he was re-elected to the Virgin Islands Legislature, serving until 1981.

Ottley died on February 10, 2022, in Fort Wayne, Indiana, at the age of 80. He was Catholic.
