= Clifton Boynes Sr =

Boat captain (1943–2025)

Clifton "Ashley" Boynes Sr. (March 18, 1943 - December 15, 2025) was a U.S. Virgin Islands boat captain, ferry operator, veteran, and businessman whose life and work were closely tied to inter-island marine transportation, especially between St. Thomas and St. John. Over several decades, he became a well-known figure in the local boating community and played a role in the development of ferry services in the territory.

== Early life and education ==
Boynes was born in Road Town, Tortola, in the British Virgin Islands. He grew up in Fresh Pond in the West End, raised largely by his mother, Vashti Parson, along with relatives who were involved in seafaring. His early exposure to maritime life would later shape his career.

In the mid-1950s, his family moved to St. Thomas. He attended Charlotte Amalie High School and graduated in 1962.

=== Military service and early career ===
After finishing high school, Boynes briefly worked with the Department of Education before enlisting in the United States Army in 1963. During his service, he was stationed in several locations, including South Carolina, Colorado, and Korea.

When he returned to the Virgin Islands, he enrolled at the College of the Virgin Islands (now the University of the Virgin Islands), where he studied construction technology. He also worked as a vocational teacher at Julius E. Sprauve School on St. John for several years.

== Maritime career ==
In 1971, he started working as a boat captain with Transportation Services, Inc., a company involved in ferry operations and eventually served as operations manager, a position he held until 2004.

In 1981, he founded Inter-Island Boat Services, which he operated for many years. His work placed him at the center of daily ferry movements between St. Thomas and St. John, and he became widely recognized among both residents and visitors.

=== Legal issues ===
In the mid-1990s, Boynes was involved in a legal case concerning an oil discharge incident involving a vessel he captained, the M/V Mona Queen. The case eventually reached the U.S. Court of Appeals for Third Circuit. Although the case drew attention at the time, Boynes was acquitted in 1999 of the oil-dumping charge.

He was also involved in later civil disputes related to Transportation Services of St. John, Inc. Court records show disagreements over company ownership, shares, and governance that continued into the early 2020s.

== Family life ==
Boynes married his high school sweetheart, Lydia Harrigan, in 1966. They raised a family rooted in both St. Thomas and St. John, including Clifton Ashley Jr. and Lori Michelle Boynes.

== Death and legacy ==
He died on December 15, 2025, at the age of 83 at the Roy Lester Schneider Hospital in St. Thomas. The cause of death was not publicly disclosed. His passing marked the end of a long life that had been closely tied to the waters and communities of the Virgin Islands. Funeral services were held in Cruz Bay, St. John.

In 2012, Boynes was named the Festival Village Honoree for the St. John Festival, recognizing his long-standing contributions to marine transportation and the community.
