= Turkiya Lowe =

American historian (born 1977)

Turkiya L. Lowe (born December 1, 1977) is an American historian. In 2017, she became the first woman and first African American to be the National Park Service's Chief Historian and Deputy Federal Preservation Officer.

== Early life and education ==
Lowe was born on December 1, 1977, to parents Vincent L. Small and Patricia D. Lowe in Savannah, Georgia. She graduated from Herschel V. Jenkins High School in 1996 and enrolled at Howard University for a Bachelor of Arts degree. During the summer of her senior year at Howard, she worked with the National Park Service's (NPS) Cultural Resources Diversity Internship Program as a Student Conservation Association Intern. She subsequently earned her Master of Arts degree in 20th century US History and Doctor of Philosophy in African American History from the University of Washington. As a doctoral student, Lowe continued to work with NPS as a reviewer with the National Register of Historic Places and coordinator of the Cultural Resources Diversity Internship Program.

== Career ==
Upon completing her doctorate in 2010, Lowe became coordinator of the NPS Cultural Resources Diversity Internship Program and served as the Southeast Regional Program (SER) Manager for the National Underground Railroad Network to Freedom Program. From there, she assumed the position of SER Chief Historian and Chief for the Southeast Region's Cultural Resource Research and Science Branch. As the Southeast Region's chief historian, Lowe helped establish the Reconstruction Era National Historical Park. In January 2017, at the age of 39, Lowe became the first woman and first African American to be the National Park Service's Chief Historian and Deputy Federal Preservation Officer.
