= Olasee Davis =

Olasee Davis is a native Virgin Islander who serves as an Extension Professor on environmental education and cultural history. He has written articles on Virgin Islands history, ecology, and agriculture.

== Personal life ==
Davis was born on St. Thomas and now lives on St. Croix in the U.S. Virgin Islands as of 2026. He has dedicated much of his life to studying and preserving the natural and cultural heritage throughout the Virgin Islands. He is known for his deep connection to the environment and leading hikes and educational tours, guiding students, professors, scientists, and researchers across the Virgin Islands and Caribbean region.

== Education and career ==
Davis earned his associate's degree at Abraham Baldwin Agricultural College in Tifton, Georgia, and his bachelor's degree from Northwest Missouri State University. He later graduated from Stephen F. Austin State University in Nacogdoches, Texas, earning a degree in forest ecology.

Davis is an Extension Professor and Extension Specialist in Natural and Cultural Resources at the University of the Virgin Islands Cooperative Extension Service, on the St. Croix campus in the School of Agriculture.

He is a prolific writer who has published works in newspapers, mixed materials, and books since 1989. His work focuses on culture, history, environment, and politics.

Davis is a member of 21 nonprofit organizations and leads workshops and community outreach programs to educate residents and visitors about the environmental and cultural heritage of the Virgin Islands.

=== Nonprofits ===
- The Virgin Islands Trail Alliance
- Virgin Islands Urban Community Forestry Council
- St. Croix Environmental Association
- St. Croix Hiking Association
- Forestry Stewardship Program
- The Nature Conservancy

== Recognition ==
- Davis has been awarded the Euan P. McFarlane Environmental Leadership Award by the Community Foundation of the Virgin Islands in 2023.
- He has been awarded Virgin Islands Environmentalist of the Year.
- The Environmental Protection Agency awarded Davis with the Environmental Quality Award of the Year.
- He was awarded the United States Virgin Islands Coastal Zone Management 25th Anniversary Distinguished Service Award.
- Davis was honored as Employee of the Year by the University of the Virgin Islands in 2007.
