= Lawrence William Cramer =

American politician (1897–1978)

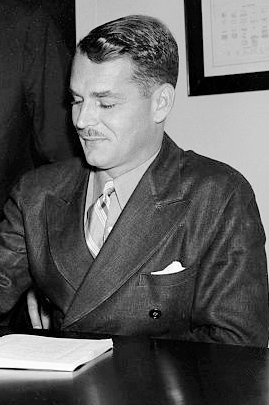
- Cramer in 1937

2nd Governor of the United States Virgin Islands
- In office December 9, 1969 – July 19, 1972
- President: Franklin Delano Roosevelt
- Preceded by: Robert Herrick
- Succeeded by: Robert Morss Lovett

Personal details
- Born: December 27, 1897 New Orleans, Louisiana, U.S.
- Died: October 18, 1978 (aged 80)
- Military career
- Allegiance: United States
- Branch: United States Army
- Service years: 1917-1918
- Conflicts: World War I

Lawrence William Cramer (December 26, 1897 – 1978) was the second civilian Governor of the United States Virgin Islands.

== Biography ==
Cramer was born in New Orleans, Louisiana. He graduated from the University of Wisconsin–Madison and obtained a master's degree from Columbia University. He then spent two years in the United States Army during World War I and was wounded in battle. After the war, he returned as a professor of government at Columbia University and wrote a book about the diplomatic background of the war.

Cramer was lieutenant governor under Paul Martin Pearson since 1931. Both he and Pearson were subpoenaed to appear in Washington, D.C., before the Senate regarding a scandal / political dispute that ultimately resulted in the forced resignation of Pearson and the appointment of Cramer as full governor on August 21, 1935. After his appointment, the Senate hearings continued and Robert Herrick was made acting-Governor.

Before Cramer was even installed, he had been tainted by his predecessor's reputation. The Islands' Colonial Council voted on July 29, 1935, to petition President Franklin D. Roosevelt to bring the Islands back under the control of the United States Navy, as it had been prior to 1931.

After his inauguration, however, Cramer made some positive moves which quelled fears. First, he was sworn in by a native judge and not a mainland one. He announced stepped-up rum exporting plans and petitioned the Department of the Interior for increased home rule for the territory. He also petitioned for universal suffrage. These moves were successful and the moves to oust Cramer ceased.

However, his difficulties resurfaced in 1937 as the Legislature of the United States Virgin Islands met for the first time and refused to consider eight of the nine bills he asked them to vote on. Cramer continued to have difficulties with the Assembly over tax law and other matters.

He resigned as governor in December, 1941. Cramer later served as executive secretary of the Committee on Fair Employment Practice during World War II.

He died on October 18, 1978.

== Legacy ==
Cramer's Park, a popular beach on St. Croix, U.S. Virgin Islands is named after him.

== Notes ==
Preceded by Robert Herrick (Acting Governor)	Governor of the U.S. Virgin Islands; 1935–1940	Succeeded by Robert Morss Lovett (Acting Governor)
