= Althea Romeo-Mark =

Antiguan-born writer and educator (born 1948)

- Born: Althea Romeo; 1948 (age 77–78); English Harbour, Antigua
- Occupations: Educator, writer

Althea Romeo-Mark (born 1948 in English Harbour) is an Antiguan-born writer and educator, who has travelled throughout the world and now makes her home in Switzerland. In addition to having published five volumes of poetry, she has been an invited speaker at international poetry festivals in Medellín, Colombia and Kisii, Kenya. She was one of the founders of the Liberian Association of Writers. In 2009, she was awarded the Marguerite Cobb McKay Prize by The Caribbean Writer.

== Early life ==
Althea Romeo was born in 1948 in English Harbour, Antigua, to Gilbert Romeo and his wife. Her father was from the Dominican Republic, though his mother was Antiguan, of British heritage, and his father was from Saint Martin. Her mother was born in Saint Croix, U.S. Virgin Islands, to an Antiguan father, of black South African heritage, and her mother was from Nevis. When she was eight years old, Romeo's family moved to St. Thomas in the U.S. Virgin Islands. After graduating from St. Peter and Paul Catholic School in 1967, Romeo earned a Bachelor of Arts degree from the University of the Virgin Islands in education and English in 1971. After briefly teaching at Addelita Cancryn Junior High School in St. Thomas, she then attended Kent State University in Ohio, earning a master's degree in literature in 1974. Her husband, a Grenadian national, had been educated in Liberia.

== Career ==
Romeo's first volume of poetry, The Silent Dancing Spirit was published in 1974. She taught for a year at Kent State in the Department of Pan-African Studies, but then decided to move to Africa and began working as an assistant English professor at the University of Liberia. In 1977, she married and continued teaching and writing, publishing three additional volumes of poetry: Palaver: West Indian Poems in 1978, Two Faces, Two Phases in 1984, and Beyond Dream: The Ritual Dancer in 1989. In 1984, Romeo-Mark, along with C. William Allen, Keith Neville Asumuyaya Best, Henry Gensang, Thomas Johnson and Ruth Wuor founded the Liberian Association of Writers (LAW). The couple lived in Liberia until 1989, when the civil war began. They then moved to London, where Romeo-Mark worked at the Fulham Cross Girls School, but her husband was unable to secure employment with his Swiss medical degree. In 1991, Mark was hired by the Basler Kinderspital in Basel and at the end of her school term, Romeo-Mark and the couple's three children joined him in Switzerland.

Romeo-Mark had a difficult time adjusting to Switzerland in the beginning as her German was Upper German and not the Swiss dialect. She took courses to become certified as an English foreign language instructor and joined an English-language writers group. Beginning in the 1990s, her poetry and short story work was published in two regional journals in the Caribbean, The Caribbean Writer and POUi, the literary journal of the University of the West Indies. In 1995, she won second prize at the annual Stauffacher's English Short Story Contest. Several works have also been published in international anthologies, like Sisters of Caliban: Contemporary Women Poets of the Caribbean published in 1996 and the short story "Easter Sunday" published in the Norwegian anthology Karibia Forteller in 2001. Since 2004, Romeo-Mark has served as the poetry editor of Seabreeze: Journal of Liberian Contemporary Literature. In 2009, she published a fifth volume of poems If Only the Dust Would Settle and was awarded the Marguerite Cobb McKay Prize by The Caribbean Writer.

In addition to recognition for her work in anthologies, Romeo-Mark has been a featured poet at several international poetry festivals including an event hosted by the Virgin Island's Cultural Heritage Institute, the 20th International Poetry Festival of Medellín and the Kistrech Poetry Festival in Kisii, Kenya.
