= Robert Herrick (novelist) =

American novelist

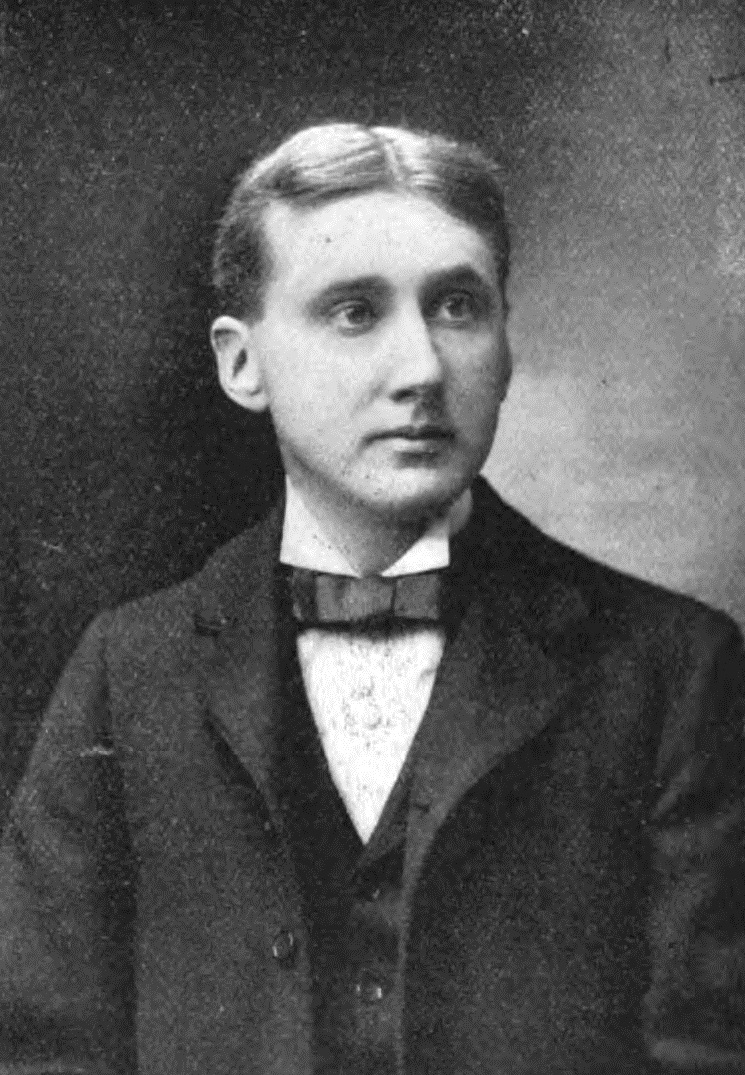
Robert Herrick.

Robert Welch Herrick (April 21, 1868 – December 23, 1938) was an American novelist who was part of a new generation of American realists. His novels deal with the turbulence of industrialized society and the turmoil it can create in sensitive, isolated people. He was also briefly acting-Governor of the United States Virgin Islands in 1935.

== Biography ==
Herrick was born in Cambridge, Massachusetts, April 21, 1868, and attended Harvard University, where he received a Bachelor of Arts degree in 1890. In 1894 he married Harriett Peabody Emery with whom he had a son, Phillip Abbot Herrick, and two daughters, Alice Freeman Palmer Herrick and Harriet Peabody Herrick. He later taught at the Massachusetts Institute of Technology. From 1905 to 1923, he was a professor of literature at the University of Chicago, during which time he wrote thirteen novels. Among those considered to be his finest was Web of Life (1900).

Herrick was praised by William James for his frank and clear-eyed views, and his work can be compared to that of England's George Gissing. Both writers developed themes of social discontent, the changing role of women, and the effects of social isolation. While seeing his world with a critical eye, Herrick escaped the shrill tone of muckraking writers like Upton Sinclair. His art was free of dogmatic isms and achieves its power from a melancholic fatalism. He dreaded the brutality and ignorance of the mob as much as he despised the avarice and ennui of the upper class. Herrick was suspicious of political doctrines and utopian legislation, feeling that true progress for human happiness must always lie in individuals making moral choices.

In January 1935, he was appointed as Government Secretary of the United States Virgin Islands, taking over many of the executive functions of the governor. During a political scandal involving then-Governor Paul Martin Pearson, both Pearson and his Lieutenant Governor, Lawrence William Cramer, were called away to testify before the Senate. Pearson was ultimately forced to resign and Cramer was appointed as his replacement, but he remained in Washington, D.C., until the conclusion of the hearings. During this period, Herrick was acting-Governor of the Islands, presiding over legislative sessions.

Herrick died of a heart attack on December 23, 1938, while in Charlotte Amalie, St. Thomas, in the islands.

== See also ==
- The Harvard Monthly

== Notes ==
Preceded by Paul Martin Pearson	Governor of the U.S. Virgin Islands; 1935 (Acting Governor)	Succeeded by Lawrence William Cramer
