= Arona Petersen =

Arona Saunders Petersen (December 10, 1908 – March 23, 1995) was an artist, businesswoman, chef and author from the United States Virgin Islands.

== Biography ==
Arona Saunders Petersen was born in Saint Thomas, on December 10, 1908 to Rebecca Hendricks and Joseph Saunders. She learned the oral tradition and folklore of the island from her mother. The preservation of these traditions were important to her life's work.

In 1935, she married Ludvig Alexander Petersen and embarked on a career in food management, working in Costa Rica, the Dominican Republic, New York City and Puerto Rico. In St. Thomas, she operated a food catering service and restaurant called Hillside Way. Petersen's unique recipes and knowledge of local cuisine and herbalism preserved many of the cultural traditions of the Virgin Islands. Her cooking and recipes also had an African influence. Throughout the years, her adaptive Caribbean Cuisine was honored by the Smithsonian Institution, who praised her for her "culinary contributions to American folklore." She earned the Carlos Cook Achievement Award in 1983 as recognition for her work as an "outstanding black businesswoman."

Petersen was a columnist for the Virgin Islands Daily News and broadcast over the radio. She published three books, Herbs and Proverbs of the Virgin Islands (1974), Kreole Ketch N' Keep: A Collection of West Indies Stories (1975), and Food and Folklore of the Virgin Islands (1990). Her writing includes recipes, ways of life and local expressions. She was also an artist.

In 1988, Petersen moved to the Willowwood retirement community in Fort Lauderdale, Florida. She died on March 23, 1995.
