= De Apostle =

- Also known as: De Apostle
- Born: Neal Daniel
- Origin: St.Croix, USVI
- Genres: Roots reggae, dancehall, reggae fusion
- Occupation: Musician
- Years active: 1991–present
- Labels: Profit Hill Records, Stand Up Muzic
- Website: www.reverbnation.com/deapostle1

Neal Daniel, known professionally as De Apostle, is a roots reggae, dance hall artist hailing from St. Croix, U.S. Virgin Islands. He started performing at the age of six in school talent shows and started professionally in the music industry at the age of thirteen. His music is in the tradition of the reggae music of St. Croix, Virgin Islands, which has a distinct "roots" feeling and is strongly rooted in Rastafari.

== History ==
Neal Daniel a.k.a. De Apostle's a.k.a. King Pos first album Genesis was released in early 2001. To follow would be numerous albums and songs culminating with The King Of The VI, which was submitted for nomination in 2009 for the 52nd Annual Grammy Awards 2010 in the category Best Reggae Album. He has collaborated with numerous artists such as multi-platinum recording artist Juvenile. Also, Sizzla, Morgan Heritage, Luciano, Turbulence, Pressure Buss Pipe, and Ishi Dube.

== Releases ==
- Genesis
- Book of Fire
- Renegade Music
- Xtreme-All or Nothing
- Island Heat Vol.1, Vol.2, Vol.3
- The Ultimate Collection
- Armed & Dangerous
- King of the V.I.
- Fight, Pray, Love
- My Heart's Coldest Winter
- Armed & dangerous vol 2
- Razor Blade Autobiography
- The Heart Burns a Thousand Fires
- King Pos Wolphpakk
