= Edith L. Williams =

US Virgin Islands educator and suffragist

- Williams in 1981
- Born: August 17, 1887; Saint Thomas, Danish Virgin Islands
- Died: June 9, 1987 (aged 99); Charlotte Amalie, Saint Thomas, U.S. Virgin Islands
- Occupations: teacher, women's rights activist and suffragist
- Years active: 1900–1945

Edith L. Williams (August 17, 1887 – June 9, 1987) was a United States Virgin Islands educator, women's rights activist, and suffragist. Williams was the first woman who attempted to vote in the Virgin Islands and when she was denied the right to register, she petitioned the court along with Eulalie Stevens and Anna M. Vessup to review their qualifications. They won their case and subsequently women throughout the Virgin Islands who were literate and property owners were allowed to vote. A bust of Williams was installed in the Franklin Delano Roosevelt Veterans Memorial Park in Charlotte Amalie, and the James Madison Elementary School was renamed as the Edith L. Williams School in 1981 in her honor.

== Early life and education ==
Edith L. Williams was born on August 17, 1887, on the island of Saint Thomas in the Danish Virgin Islands. Both of her parents had been born on Saint Croix. During her youth, she played cricket for the Harlem Virgin Islands Girls team and traveled several times to compete in matches in the United States. She was both a batter and a bowler in cricket, and also helped organize a girls' soft ball team in St. Thomas. Williams completed her education at the age of 13 in the missionary schools run by the Moravian Church.

== Career ==
In 1900, Williams began teaching at the Moravian Town School in Charlotte Amalie. Early in her career, she had joined with other women to work on issues which would improve the lives of teachers and their students. They formed the St. Thomas Teachers' Association and worked to establish a Teachers' Institute to train candidates and improve the education of those already in the teaching profession. Members of the Association later voluntarily taught students who wanted to continue their education beyond the mandatory 9th school grade and were instrumental in graduating the first high school students in 1931 and establishing high school education on the island.

Williams transferred to George Washington Elementary School from the Moravian School in 1917. In that year, the Danish West Indies was sold to the United States and the Colonial Law of 1906 passed by Denmark for governance in the islands was retained for the unincorporated territory. When women in the United States gained the right to vote in 1920 through the Nineteenth Amendment, it was widely believed that Virgin Islands women already had suffrage by virtue of the 1915 extension of the franchise to Danish women. In 1921, the U.S. Supreme Court clarified that constitutional rights did not extend to residents of either Puerto Rico or the Virgin Islands, as they were defined in Puerto Rico by the Organic Act of 1900 and in the Virgin Islands by the Danish Colonial Law of 1906. In 1922 Williams began teaching at Dober Elementary School, which had formerly been known as Vestergade School and Ulysses S. Grant School, in Savan.

Transferred to James Madison School in 1928, Williams became the school principal in 1932. While heading Madison, she created the first school lunch program in the Virgin Islands. Teaching students and their parents how to garden, she created a vegetable patch on the school grounds, allowing them to grow their own food, prepare it for lunches, and sell the excess produce. Williams owned her own home on Hospital Grounds Road in Charlotte Amalie and walked to her teaching post at Madison every day.

In 1931, the territory, which had been administrated by the United States Navy, was turned over to civilian governance. Virgin Islands women felt that they would be granted suffrage when citizenship was given to people in the territory in 1932, but voting rights did not occur. Urged on by businesswoman Ella Gifft, Williams, Bertha C. Boschulte, and Eulalie Stevens joined to fight for suffrage. Each of them had ties to educational activities and the suffrage movement in the United States. They were aware of developments in Puerto Rico led by Milagros Benet de Mewton to gain enfranchisement there in 1929.

In 1935, Elsie Hill, a former suffragist and wife of Judge Albert Levitt, encouraged Boschulte, secretary of the Teachers' Association, and other association members to challenge their voting exclusion. The Association filed a lawsuit in the United States District Court for the Virgin Islands in November 1935 and Levitt ruled that Danish Colonial Law was unconstitutional, as it contravened the provisions of the Nineteenth Amendment, and had never been intended to restrict the vote to men. The following month, Williams became the first woman to register to vote and was quickly followed by nearly two dozen other women. The Board of Elections rejected all of the women registrants, causing Hill to arrange for the pro bono services of lawyer, Robert Claiborne. Choosing Williams, Eulalie Stevens, and Anna M. Vessup as petitioners, the Teachers' Association sought to obtain a Writ Of Mandamus, a type of court order, compelling the election officers to allow the women's registrations. The three women were chosen because, except for their gender, they met the age, income, literacy, property, and respectability requirements for any other voter. Once again Levitt ruled in their favor, allowing qualified women to vote in the 1936 election. Their success led to mobilization to register to vote in Saint Croix and Saint John and led to universal suffrage in 1938.

Williams' last post was at Thomas Jefferson Elementary, where she was assigned in 1937. She remained there until her retirement in 1945. She was honored for her service with a commendation from the Legislature of the Virgin Islands in 1974. In 1981, the James Madison Elementary School was renamed as the Edith L. Williams Elementary School in recognition of her service to the Virgin Islands and the following year, she became the first person inducted into the Virgin Islands Education Review Hall of Fame.

== Death and legacy ==
Williams died on June 9, 1987, in Charlotte Amalie. Often referred to as the "Mother of Education" in the Virgin Islands, according to Rosalyn Terborg-Penn, she is recognized widely not only for her pioneering role in education, but for her community service and her quest to attain suffrage. A statue of Williams was installed in the Franklin Delano Roosevelt Veterans Memorial Park in Charlotte Amalie. Mounted on a pillar, a bust of her upper torso depicts her holding a book in her left hand and a coal pot in the right. It bears the inscription: "Feed not only the body, the mind must also be nourished".
