= Ella Gifft =

Ella Gifft, also Ella Gift (c. 1882 – 26 December 1964), was a Black entrepreneur and suffragist from the United States Virgin Islands, who founded the Suffragist League and was one of the first women to register to vote in the territory. She smuggled alcohol into the territory during the Prohibition era, activity which is remembered in the folk song "Over the Side".

== Suffrage ==
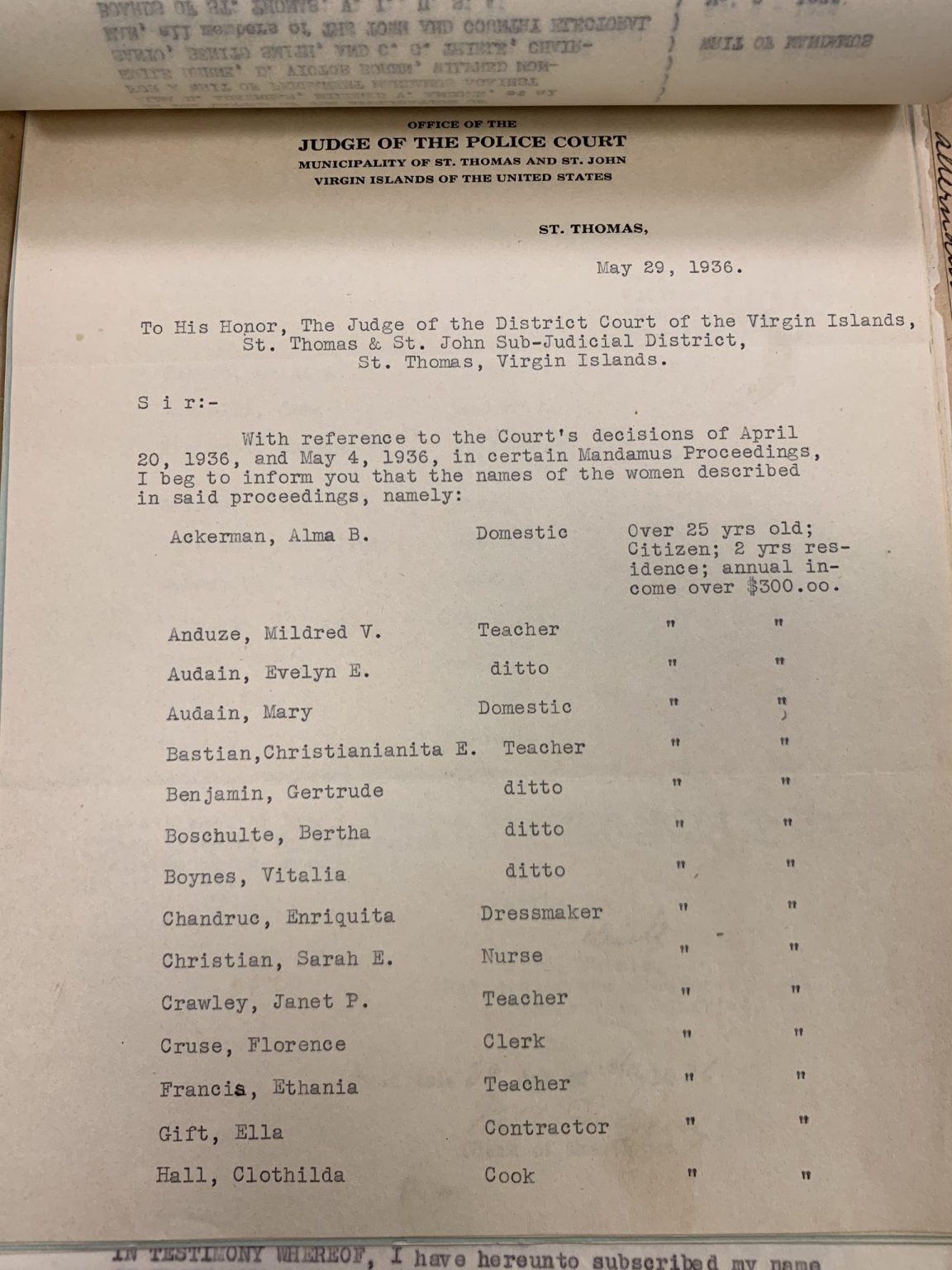
1936 women voters in St Thomas, US Virgin Islands (page 1)

Gifft was one of the first suffrage activists in the US Virgin Islands and according to the memoir of Joseph O'Neal, was a "teacher from Jost Van Dyke". She established the Suffragist League there on 29 December 1932. Other prominent suffragists in the movement included Bertha C. Boschulte, Eulalie Stevens, and Edith L. Williams, who were all teachers. Reportedly, when Herbert Hoover visited St Thomas, Gifft waited to meet him, then presented him with a petition for the islands to have their own governor, which she had secreted on her person. The group was aware of developments in Puerto Rico led by Milagros Benet de Mewton to gain enfranchisement there in 1929. Due to their pressure, in 1936 Judge Albert Levitt ruled that women were allowed to vote in the 1936 election.

An influential figure in politics, Gifft also encouraged Earle B. Ottley to seek election to the Legislative Assembly in 1936.

== Prohibition ==
During Prohibition, Gifft brought alcohol into the islands illegally. According to a still popular folk-song called "Over the Side", she hid rum in specially made pockets in her pantalettes, but had to throw it over the side of the boat when customs officials caught up with her.
