= Bertha C. Boschulte =

American educator, women's rights activist, statistician and politician (1906–2004)

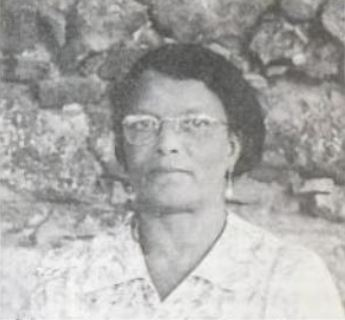
- Boschulte in 1963
- Born: Bertha Christina Boschulte; March 8, 1906; Saint Thomas, Danish Virgin Islands
- Died: August 18, 2004 (aged 98); Saint Thomas, U.S. Virgin Islands
- Occupations: educator, statistician, women's rights activist, politician
- Years active: 1924–1976

Bertha C. Boschulte (March 8, 1906 – August 18, 2004) was an American educator, women's rights activist, statistician and politician. During her tenure as a teacher, she actively worked to attain women's suffrage in the Virgin Islands. After obtaining her master's degree in Public Health, she worked as the director of the Statistical Service from 1952 and was then appointed as director of the Division of Vital Records and Statistical Services. From 1955 to 1957, she was the General Services director of the Department of Health. Boschulte ran for a Senate seat and was elected in 1964, serving one term. She worked on the Commission on the Status of Women from 1969 and in 1970 was elected chair of the Virgin Islands Board of Education. In 1976, the new Junior High School in Bovoni Estate was named the Bertha C. Boschulte Middle School, in her honor.

== Early life ==
Bertha Christina Boschulte was born on March 8, 1906 (Note: Most sources give her date of birth as March 30, 1906; however, her baptismal record of May 13, 1906 shows March 8.) on Saint Thomas in the Danish Virgin Islands to Jessie Alexandrina (née Millen) and Rupert R. Boschulte. She attended school in the local school system at James Monroe Elementary School and Charlotte Amalie Junior-Senior High School. After teaching for a year in 1924, she then moved to Virginia and attended the Hampton Institute, graduating in 1929 with distinction, gaining a Bachelor of Science in English and mathematics.

== Career ==
After her graduation, Boschulte returned to the Virgin Islands and began teaching at the Charlotte Amalie High School. During her time at Hampton, she had become aware of women's issues and was particularly interested in the suffrage movement. When she returned to St. Thomas, Boschulte joined with other women, including Ella Gifft, Eulalie Stevens, and Edith L. Williams to try to gain the vote for women in the Virgin Islands. She was the secretary of the St. Thomas Teacher's Association in 1935, when women teachers attempted to register and were rejected. The Teacher's Association filed suit and Judge Albert Levitt, ruled in their favor, ordering the Election Board to allow qualified women to register to vote.

In 1938, Boschulte was appointed acting principal of the school and in 1940 officially became the principal. She returned to the mainland to attend Teachers College, Columbia University and graduated with master's degree in educational administration in 1945. She attained a license to teach in New York and taught at P.S. 81 in 1946. While she was in the states, Boschulte attended the International Assembly of Women held in New York. The conference, sponsored by Eleanor Roosevelt had representatives from 53 countries and was convened to get the women's perspective on post-war social organization. Resolutions made at the gathering supported the creation of the United Nations and endorsed legal and political equality for women.

Returning to St. Thomas in 1947, Boschulte worked with other teachers in the Teacher Association to organize the Teacher's Institute and Evening School. The goal of the Association was to increase the standard of professionalism in teaching and they offered classes for teachers to upgrade their training. Boschulte was one of the instructors for both initiatives. In 1949, she was offered a post as a statistician in the Health Department. Deciding to forgo a PhD in education at Columbia, she accepted the offer, which included attending a training program at the University of Michigan School of Public Health, and resigned as principal of the high school.

In 1950, Boschulte moved to Ann Arbor, Michigan and began her studies, which included field trips to local health departments to evaluate their operations. Joining Delta Omega, she graduated in 1951 with a master's degree in public health. Returning to St. Thomas, she was appointed as director of the Statistical Service for the Health Department in 1952. When the Division of Vital Records and Statistical Services was founded, she became the first director, and then from 1955 to 1957, she was the General Services director of the Department of Health. She resigned from the Health Department in 1963, though she continued to work for the department on a contractual basis.

In 1964, Boschulte was elected as a Senator in the Legislature of the Virgin Islands. In 1965, the local chapter of the Federation of Business and Professional Women named her "Woman of the Year". She ran for a second legislative term in 1966, but lost her race by 30 votes. In 1969, she was appointed to serve on the Commission on the Status of Women and the following year was elected to the board of the territorial Department of Education, and served as its chair. In 1976, a new junior high school was approved to be built in Bovoni bearing her name. The Bertha C. Boschulte Middle School was dedicated on March 1, 1981.

== Death and legacy ==
Boschulte died on August 18, 2004, on St. Thomas. She is remembered for her dedication to the development of the educational system in the Virgin Islands.
