= 2014 United States Virgin Islands gubernatorial election =

- November 4, 2014 (first round); November 14, 2014 (runoff)
- Registered: 51,326
- Turnout: 54.32% (runoff: 49.62% )
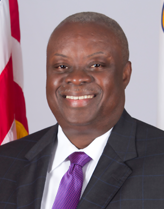

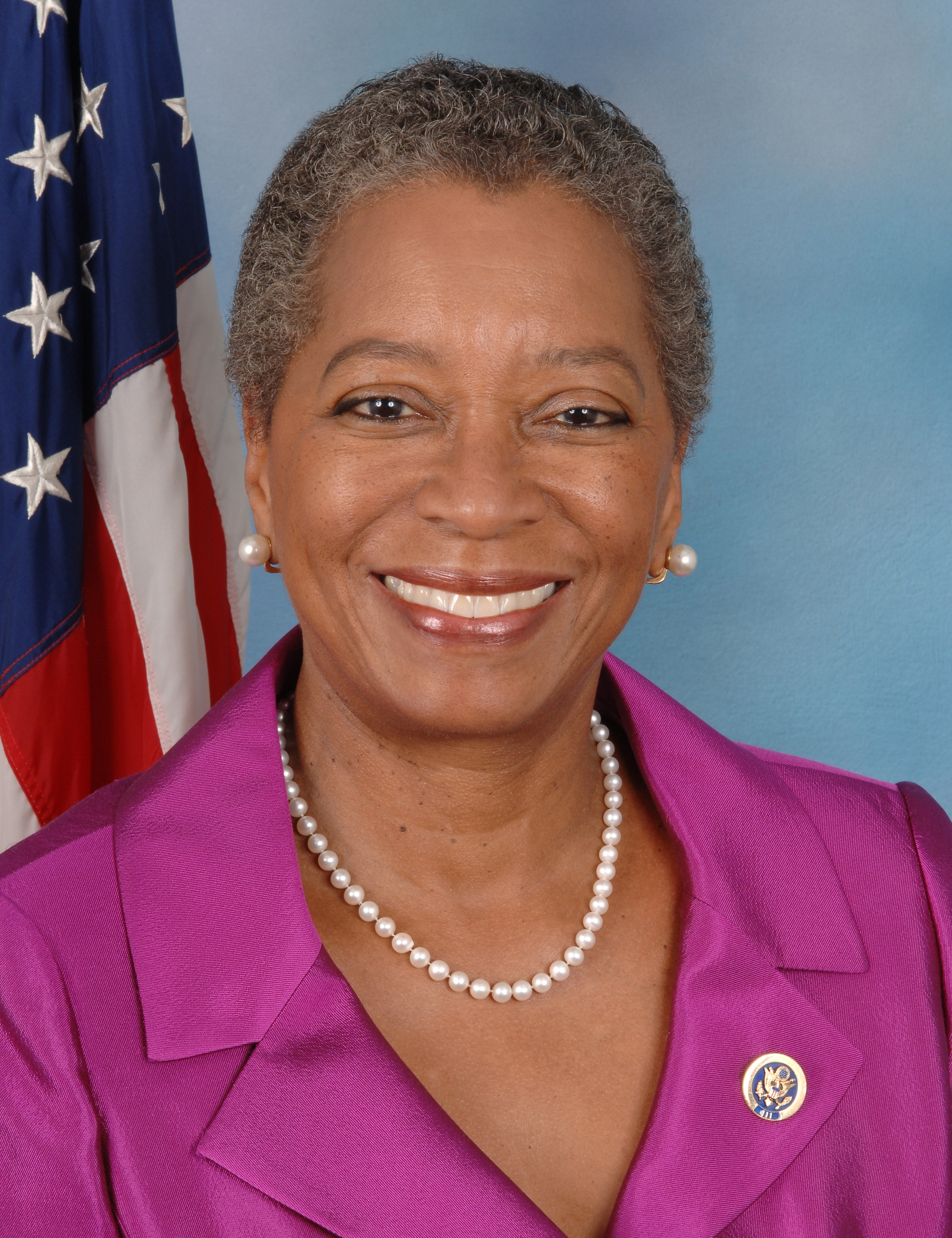
Nominee	Kenneth Mapp	Donna Christian-Christensen
Party	Independent	Democratic
Running mate	Osbert Potter	Basil Ottley Jr.
Popular vote	12,108 general 15,934 runoff	10,173 general 9,399 runoff
Percentage	46.6% general 62.9% runoff	39.2% general 37.1% runoff
Governor before election
John de Jongh
Democratic
Elected Governor
Kenneth Mapp
Independent

The 2014 U.S. Virgin Islands gubernatorial election took place on November 4, 2014, to elect the governor of the United States Virgin Islands. Incumbent Democratic governor John de Jongh was term-limited and was unable run for re-election to a third term in office. Since no candidate received a majority in the general election, as required by the Revised Organic Act of the Virgin Islands, a runoff was held between Donna Christian-Christensen and Kenneth Mapp, the two top vote receivers. Mapp went on to win the run off in a landslide victory, with almost 63% of the vote.

== Democratic primary ==
=== Candidates ===
- Donna Christian-Christensen, Delegate to the U.S. House of Representatives

- Running mate: Basil Ottley, Jr., former Virgin Islands Senator

- Adlah Donastorg Jr., former Virgin Islands Senator and candidate for governor in 2006 and 2010

- Running mate: Angel A. "Gito" Torres

- Gregory Francis, lieutenant governor

- Running mate: Patrick Sprauve

- Gerard Luz James, former lieutenant governor and candidate for governor in 2002 and 2010

- Running mate: Winston Braithwaite

- Marvin Pickering, former senior vice president and chief financial officer of Cruzan Rum

- Running mate: Calford Martin

- Moleto Smith, former deputy and interim/acting commissioner of the Virgin Islands Department of Human Services

- Running mate: Hubert Frederick, business executive and former deputy commissioner of the Virgin Islands Department of Health

=== Results ===
Candidate	Running mate	Votes	%
Donna Christian-Christensen	Basil Ottley	3,635	36.49
Adlah Donastorg Jr.	Angel "Gito" Torres	2,333	23.42
Gregory Francis	Patrick Simeon Sprauve	1,286	12.91
Marvin Pickering	Calford Martín	993	9.97
Gerard Luz James	Winston Braithwaite	936	9.40
Moleto Smith Jr.	Hubert Frederick	768	7.71
Write in		11	0.11
Total		9,962	100.00

== Independent candidates ==
- Kenneth Mapp, former lieutenant governor and candidate for governor in 2006 and 2010

- Running mate: Osbert Potter, former Virgin Islands Senator, former Commissioner of Licensing and Consumer Affairs and former television show host ("Behind the Headlines" on WTJX-TV).

- Soraya Diase Coffelt, former Territorial Court Judge
- Mona Barnes, first female State Command Sergeant Major of the Virgin Islands

- Running mate: Wendy Coram

- Sheila Alvin Scallion

- Running mate: Robert Quinn

== Polling ==
Poll source	Date(s) administered	Sample size	Christensen & Ottley (D)	Mapp & Potter (I)	Coffelt & Canegata (I)	Barnes & Coram (I)	Scallion & Quinn (I)	Francis & Gonzalez (I)
Virgin Islands Consortium	August 8 - November 3, 2014	2,369	41%	38%	12%	6%	2%	1%

Poll source	Date(s) administered	Sample size	Christensen & Ottley (D)	Mapp & Potter (I)	Coffelt & Canegata (I)	Barnes & Coram (I)	Scallion & Quinn (I)	Francis & Gonzalez (I)
Virgin Islands Consortium	August 8 - November 3, 2014	393	160	149	48	25	—	2

Poll source	Date(s) administered	Sample size	Margin of error	Christensen & Ottley (D)	Mapp & Potter (I)	Coffelt & Canegata (I)	Barnes & Coram (I)	Scallion & Quinn (I)	Francis & Gonzalez (I)
Virgin Islands Consortium	August 8 - November 3, 2014	—	13	25	3	1	1	1	

Poll source	Date(s) administered	Sample size	Christensen & Ottley (D)	Mapp & Potter (I)	Coffelt & Canegata (I)	Barnes & Coram (I)	Scallion & Quinn (I)	Francis & Gonzalez (I)
Virgin Islands Consortium	August 8 - November 3, 2014	—	147	124	47	22	8	1

Poll source	Date(s) administered	Sample size	Margin of error	Donna Christensen (D)	Kenneth Mapp (I)	Mona Barnes (I)	Soraya Diase-Coffelt (I)	Shelia Scullion (I)	Undecided
UVI	October 16-26, 2014	—	±3.7	23%	28%	5%	4%	1%	29%

== Results ==
Candidate	Running mate	Party	First round		Second round	
Candidate	Running mate	Party	Votes	%	Votes	%
Kenneth Mapp	Osbert Potter	Independent	12,108	46.61	15,934	62.90
Donna Christian-Christensen	Basil Ottley Jr.	Democratic Party	10,173	39.16	9,399	37.10
Soraya Diase Coffelt	John M. Canegata	Independent	1,837	7.07		
Mona L. Barnes	Wendy V. Coram	Independent	1,693	6.52		
Sheila A. Scullion	Robert J. Quinn	Independent	83	0.32		
Write in			81	0.31		
Total			25,975	100.00	25,333	100.00
Total votes			27,879	–	25,469	–
Registered voters/turnout			51,326	54.32	51,326	49.62

=== By district ===
District	Kenneth Mapp (I)	Donna Christensen (D)	Mona Barnes (I)	Soraya Diase Coffelt (I)	Sheila A. Scullion (I)	Write-in	Total
St. Croix	First round: 7,255 (54.55%)	4,332 (32.57%)	880 (6.62%)	767 (5.77%)	43 (0.32%)	23 (0.17%)	13,300
St. Thomas/St. John	4,853 (38.29%)	First round: 5,841 (46.08%)	1,070 (8.44%)	813 (6.41%)	58 (0.46%)	40 (0.32%)	12,675

District	Kenneth Mapp (I)	Donna Christensen (D)	Write-in	Total
St. Croix	Second round: 9,196 (69.87%)	3,945 (29.97%)	20 (0.15%)	13,161
St. Thomas/St. John	Second round: 6,738 (55.07%)	5,454 (44.58%)	43 (0.35%)	12,235

=== By precinct ===
Precinct	Mapp	Christensen	Barnes	Coffelt	Scullion	Total
Alexander Henderson ES	First round: 926	464	114	57	1	1,562
Claude O. Markoe ES	First round: 339	136	28	21	1	525
Evelyn M. Williams ES	First round: 711	305	86	48	6	1,156
St. Geralds Hall	First round: 148	114	8	21	1	292
Eulalie Rivera ES	First round: 565	249	70	31	—	915
Alfredo Andrews ES	First round: 362	199	42	35	1	639
Charles H. Emanuel ES	First round: 572	298	59	55	2	986
Ricardo Richards ES	First round: 716	433	116	67	—	1,332
Lew Muckle ES	First round: 691	360	88	66	—	1,205
Juanita Gardine ES	First round: 564	422	86	88	2	1,162
John F. Kennedy Terrace	First round: 266	111	27	14	4	422
Elena L. Christian JHS	First round: 595	445	54	91	8	1,193
Pearl B. Larsen ES	434	First round: 514	52	136	11	1,147
Florence Williams Library	First round: 235	181	33	28	4	481
Ivanna Eudora Kean HS	208	First round: 239	30	53	2	532
Joseph Gomez ES	First round: 502	427	75	97	2	1,103
Anna's Retreat Center	360	First round: 391	87	72	1	911
E. Benjamin Oliver ES	310	First round: 345	60	66	2	783
Bertha C. Boschulte MS	First round: 299	287	69	46	2	703
CAHS Gym	331	First round: 359	39	73	1	803
CAHS Cafeteria	192	First round: 210	37	23	2	464
Oswald Harris Court	First round: 185	129	22	16	1	353
Winston Raymo Rec. Center	243	First round: 315	56	55	2	671
Gladys A. Abraham ES	423	First round: 513	81	111	1	1,129
Ulla F. Muller ES (A-L)	244	First round: 329	42	53	5	673
Addelita Cancryn JHS	297	First round: 368	41	62	2	770
Leonard Dober ES (North)	130	First round: 186	18	17	3	354
Leonard Dober ES (South)	124	First round: 138	21	24	—	307
Ulla F. Muller ES (M-Z)	195	First round: 228	20	40	2	485
Joseph Sibilly ES - Bl	205	First round: 393	29	98	2	727
Joseph Sibilly ES - Bld	121	First round: 244	29	80	2	476
Julius E. Sprauve ES	312	First round: 350	31	45	3	741
Guy Benjamin ES	40	First round: 163	6	22	4	235
STX Mail-In Absentee	First round: 129	100	16	9	2	256
STX Provisional	First round: 2	1	1	—	—	3
STT/STJ Mail-In Absentee	74	First round: 151	10	13	—	248
STT/STJ Provisional	58	First round: 76	10	1	4	149

Precinct	Mapp	Christensen	Total
Alexander Henderson ES	Second round: 1,190	464	1,654
Claude O. Markoe ES	Second round: 429	104	533
Evelyn M. Williams ES	Second round: 946	252	1,198
St. Geralds Hall	Second round: 186	120	306
Eulalie Rivera ES	Second round: 700	209	909
Alfredo Andrews ES	Second round: 461	193	654
Charles H. Emanuel ES	Second round: 701	280	981
Ricardo Richards ES	Second round: 860	310	1,170
Lew Muckle ES	Second round: 859	300	1,159
Juanita Gardine ES	Second round: 709	361	1,070
John F. Kennedy Terrace	Second round: 323	108	431
Elena L. Christian JHS	Second round: 745	407	1,152
Pearl B. Larsen ES	Second round: 547	532	1,079
Florence Williams Library	Second round: 280	159	439
Ivanna Eudora Kean HS	Second round: 286	210	496
Joseph Gomez ES	Second round: 650	397	1,047
Anna's Retreat Center	Second round: 330	193	520
E. Benjamin Oliver ES	Second round: 441	282	723
Bertha C. Boschulte MS	Second round: 463	237	700
CAHS Gym	Second round: 444	302	746
CAHS Cafeteria	Second round: 239	177	416
Oswald Harris Court	Second round: 218	99	317
Winston Raymo Rec. Center	Second round: 360	263	623
Gladys A. Abraham ES	Second round: 613	497	1,110
Ulla F. Muller ES (A-L)	Second round: 343	301	644
Addelita Cancryn JHS	Second round: 432	338	770
Leonard Dober ES (North)	Second round:202	147	349
Leonard Dober ES (South)	Second round: 165	116	281
Ulla F. Muller ES (M-Z)	Second round: 249	188	437
Joseph Sibilly ES - Bl	291	Second round: 366	657
Joseph Sibilly ES - Bld	178	Second round: 235	413
Julius E. Sprauve ES	Second round: 372	307	679
Guy Benjamin ES	56	Second round: 178	234
STX Mail-In Absentee	Second round: 258	203	461
STX Provisional	Second round: 2	Second round: 2	4
STT/STJ Mail-In Absentee	326	Second round: 558	884
STT/STJ Provisional	Second round: 80	63	143
