= Pamela Richards Samuel =

United States Virgin Islands politician

Pamela C. Richards Samuel (1959-2024) was a U.S. Virgin Islander politician. Most recently, Richards Samuel was a candidate for Lieutenant Governor of the United States Virgin Islands in the 2010 election as the running mate of Democratic gubernatorial candidate James O'Bryan Jr. She has previously served as the former Commissioner of Tourism of the U.S. Virgin Islands.

Richards Samuel was born in 1959 to Arthur A. Richards and Myrna T. Richards, who reside in Frederiksted. She is married to Avelino Samuel, a native of Saint John, U.S. Virgin Islands. She graduated from Charlotte Amalie High School on Saint Thomas in 1977. Richards Samuel then received her bachelor's degree in 1981 from the University of Southern California.

In addition to her former post as Commissioner of Tourism, Richards Samuel served as the assistant press secretary to former Governor Alexander A. Farrelly. She also served as the press secretary for U.S.V.I. Senator David S. Jones and the office manager for the late Senator Lorraine Berry.

Richards Samuel was also the First Vice President and Chairman of the Caribbean Tourism Association. She has served as the executive director of the Democratic Party of the Virgin Islands.

James O'Bryan Jr. and Richards Samuel announced their joint gubernatorial ticket in an hour-long presentation on WDHP radio station on August 17, 2010. Samuel Richards announced her candidacy for Lt. Governor on the phone from Saint Croix during the radio program. She cited the U.S. Virgin Islands property tax as the "straw that broke the camel's back" which led her to run for Lieutenant Governor. O'Bryan and Richards Samuel listed their top platform issues as crime, education, health care and employment.

O'Bryan and Richards Samuel finished in fourth place in the Democratic gubernatorial primary election held on September 11, 2010. Their joint ticket received 432 votes in the primary election, the equivalent of 3% of the total vote. James O'Bryan finished behind incumbent Governor John de Jongh, Senator Adlah Donastorg and former Lt. Governor Gerard Luz James respectively.
