= James O'Bryan Jr. =

United States Virgin Islander politician

Jimmy O'Bryan

Island Administrator of St. Thomas and Water Island
- In office April 29, 2003 – January 30, 2007
- Preceded by: Louis Hill
- Succeeded by: Barbara A. Petersen

Chair of the Virgin Islands Democratic Party
- In office 1998 – April 2005
- Preceded by: Marylyn Stapleton
- Succeeded by: Cecil Benjamin

Personal details
- Born: James O'Bryan Jr. June 7, 1956 (age 69) Saint Thomas, U.S. Virgin Islands
- Party: Democratic (before 2026); Independent (2026–present)
- Education: Boston University (BA)

James A. "Jimmy" O'Bryan Jr. (born June 7, 1956, in Saint Thomas, U.S. Virgin Islands) is a United States Virgin Islander politician, spokesman and former press secretary. He was previously the administrator of the island of Saint Thomas, U.S. Virgin Islands.

O'Bryan was a Democratic Party candidate for governor of the United States Virgin Islands in the 2010 gubernatorial election. His running mate for lieutenant governor was Pamela Richards Samuel.

== Biography ==
=== Early life ===
O'Bryan is a native of Saint Thomas, where he was born on June 7, 1956, to James A. O’Bryan Sr. and Elsa D. Oliver O’Bryan. He graduated from Charlotte Amalie High School in Charlotte Amalie in 1974 and was president of his class. He went on to receive a bachelor's degree in mass communications and political science from Boston University in 1978.

=== Political career ===
O'Bryan was a senator in the Legislature of the Virgin Islands's 16th Legislature (1985–1986) for one term. He was also the chairman of the Democratic Party of the Virgin Islands for two terms.

He was appointed as the press secretary for the former governor, Alexander A. Farrelly.

O'Bryan was extremely active during the administration of the former governor, Charles Turnbull. He headed the Turnbull administration's Office of Public Relations, and was Turnbull's spokesperson during his first term. He also chaired a Turnbull-created task force which worked to remove abandoned vehicles and other garbage from Saint Thomas. In April 2003, the Turnbull administration appointed O'Bryan as head of the committee charged with rebuilding the Sanderilla Thomas Bungalow at Rothschild Francis "Market" Square on the island of Saint Thomas.

He was also the president of Virgin Islanders for Responsive Government.

On April 29, 2003, Governor Turnbull appointed O'Bryan as the administrator of St. Thomas and Water Island, succeeding Louis Hill who had resigned in January 2003 to take office as a senator in the legislature. O'Bryan was working as the assistant to the governor for public affairs and policy initiatives at the time of his appointment.

In 2010, O'Bryan left his morning slot on WDHP (1620 AM), a local radio station, to pursue a gubernatorial campaign.

=== 2010 candidacy for governor ===
O'Bryan announced his candidacy for governor of the United States Virgin Islands as a member of the Democratic Party in the 2010 gubernatorial election. His running mate for lieutenant governor was Pamela Richards Samuel, the former U.S.V.I. Commissioner of Tourism. They announced the launch of their campaign in an hour-long presentation on the WDHP radio station on August 17, 2010. He listed the top issues of their campaign platform as public safety, education, health care and employment.

O'Bryan faced the incumbent governor, John de Jongh, Senator Adlah Donastorg and former Lieutenant Governor Gerard Luz James for the Democratic nomination in the primary election on September 11, 2010.

O'Bryan and Richards Samuel lost the Democratic gubernatorial primary election in 2010, placing fourth behind De Jongh, Donastorg and James. O'Bryan received 432 votes in the election, approximately 3% of the total vote. OHe told supporters and the media following the election, "The people have spoken, I respect their wishes, and I will go forward with this episode from now on." He would not say if he would endorse Governor John de Jongh, the winner of the primary, for a second term, explaining, "I’m going to listen to the rain tonight and think on it."

Party political offices
Preceded by Marylyn Stapleton	Chair of the Virgin Islands Democratic Party; 1998–2005	Succeeded by Cecil Benjamin
Political offices
Preceded by Louis Hill	Island Administrator of St. Thomas and Water Island; 2003–2007	Succeeded by Barbara A. Petersen
