= 2018 United States Virgin Islands gubernatorial election =

- November 6, 2018 (general); November 20, 2018 (runoff)
- Registered: 51,095
- Turnout: first round: 51.56% Runoff: 45.34%
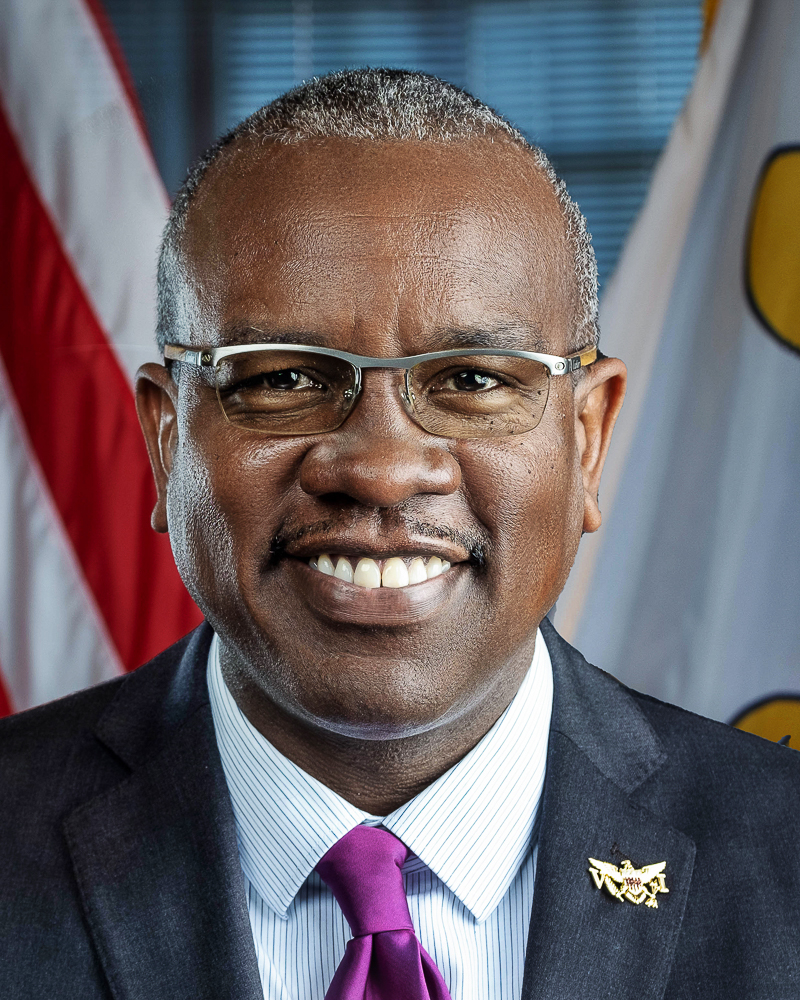

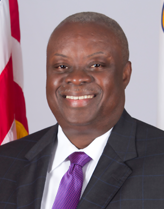
Candidate	Albert Bryan	Kenneth Mapp
Party	Democratic	Independent
Running mate	Tregenza Roach	Osbert Potter
Popular vote	12,677	10,288
Percentage	55.04%	44.67%
- Results by district Bryan: Mapp
Governor before election
Kenneth Mapp
Independent
Elected Governor
Albert Bryan
Democratic

The 2018 U.S. Virgin Islands gubernatorial election took place on November 6, 2018, to select the governor of the United States Virgin Islands. The election was held concurrently with the 2018 United States midterm elections. On election day, November 6, Bryan earned 38.08% of the vote, with Mapp coming in second with 33.45%. Since no candidate received a majority of the general election vote, as required by the Revised Organic Act of the Virgin Islands, a runoff was held 14 days later between Albert Bryan Jr. and Incumbent Governor Kenneth Mapp, the top two vote-getters. On November 20, 2018, Democrat Albert Bryan Jr. won the runoff with 54.5% of the vote. The election marked the first time in 20 years since a sitting governor lost reelection in Virgin Islands history.

The incumbent Governor Kenneth Mapp ran for reelection to a second term as an Independent politician with incumbent Lt. Gov. Osbert Potter. Mapp faced off against former Virgin Islands Labor Commissioner Albert Bryan Jr., who won the August 4 Democratic primary; Bryan earned 39.23% of the vote in the primary, defeating Allison "Allie" Petrus (33.67%) and Angel E. Dawson Jr. (26.68%). Also on the November ballot were Adlah "Foncie" Donastorg, Warren Mosler, Soraya Diase Coffelt, Moleto A. Smith, and Janette Millin Young.

A similar scenario to the 1998 gubernatorial race, where both districts were divided over one candidate for the other. St. Croix largely went for Turnbull while Schneider, the incumbent governor held his lead in St. Thomas/St. John, although a close race in that district. This time around, St. Thomas/St. John largely went for Bryan and Mapp, the incumbent governor dominated St. Croix.

== Democratic primary ==
=== Candidates ===
- Albert Bryan, former Labor Commissioner

- Running mate: Tregenza Roach, territorial senator

- Angel Dawson Jr., former Finance Commissioner

- Running mate: Marise James

- Allison "Allie" Petrus, former territorial senator

- Running mate: Sammuel Sanes, territorial senator

The 2018 Democratic primary was held on August 4, 2018. The three Democratic hopefuls who ran in the primary were former Finance Commissioner Angel Dawson Jr., former Labor Commissioner Albert Bryan Jr., and former three-term Senator Allison Petrus. Early voting occurred from July 14 to July 25, 2018. According to Supervisor of Elections Caroline Fawkes, turnout was low with some board members expressing disappointment in the numbers. Out of 32,330 registered voters, only 30.61% participated in the primary.

Following a defeat in the primary, both Petrus and Dawson pledged support for the Bryan-Roach campaign going into the general election. At a press conference, the teams came up with “Because we believe in a “Better Tomorrow” (Angel Dawson's slogan), we are now officially “All In” (Allison Petrus's slogan), to “Change Course Now,”

=== Debates ===
2018 The Virgin Islands Consortium & WTJX gubernatorial forum
No.	Date	Host	Moderator	Link	Participants		
P Participant A Absent N Non-invitee I Invitee W Withdrawn							
P Participant A Absent N Non-invitee I Invitee W Withdrawn					Angel Dawson Jr.	Albert Bryan	Allison “Allie” Petrus
1	July 17, 2018	WTJX-TV	Ernice Gilbert		P	P	P

=== Endorsements ===
Albert Bryan
- Angel E. Dawson Jr., former finance commissioner & 2018 gubernatorial candidate
- Allison "Allie" Petrus, businessman & former St. Thomas-St. John senator
- Allison DeGazon, 2018 senatorial candidate

=== Polling places ===
St. Croix - David Canegata Recreation Center, Juanita Gardine Elementary School, Ricardo Richards Elementary School, Claude Markoe Elementary School, St. Croix Educational Complex; St. Thomas - Lockhart Elementary School, Charles W. Turnbull Regional Library, UVI Sports and Fitness Center; St. John - Julius Sprauve School

=== Results ===
Candidate	Running mate	Votes	%
Albert Bryan Jr.	Tregenza Roach	3,331	39.23
Allison "Allie" Petrus	Sammuel Sanes	2,859	33.67
Angel E. Dawson Jr.	Marise James	2,265	26.68
Write in		36	0.42
Total		8,491	100.00

==== By precinct ====
Precinct	Dawson	Bryan	Petrus	Write-in	Total
Alexander Henderson	107 (33.86%)	141 (44.62%)	67 (21.20%)	1 (0.32%)	316
Claude O. Markoe	81 (32.27%)	116 (46.22%)	53 (21.12%)	1 (0.40%)	251
Evelyn M. Williams ES	67 (26.38%)	117 (46.06%)	69 (27.17%)	1 (0.39%)	254
Eulalie R. Rivera ES	57 (27.40%)	90 (43.27%)	59 (28.37%)	2 (0.96%)	208
Alfredo Andrews ES	55 (44.35%)	29 (23.39%)	37 (29.84%)	3 (2.42%)	124
Ricardo Richards ES	123 (33.33%)	137 (37.13%)	107 (29.00%)	2 (0.54%)	369
Lew Muckle ES	125 (42.52%)	108 (36.73%)	60 (20.41%)	1 (0.34%)	294
Juanita Gardine ES	124 (35.03%)	138 (38.98%)	92 (25.99%)	—	354
John F. Kennedy Terrace	28 (30.77%)	29 (31.87%)	34 (37.36%)	—	91
Elena L. Christian JHS	114 (32.57%)	134 (38.29%)	100 (28.57%)	2 (0.57%)	350
Pearl B. Larsen ES	116 (36.14%)	104 (32.40%)	101 (31.46%)	—	321
St. Croix Educational Complex	92 (33.33%)	107 (38.77%)	77 (27.90%)	—	276
Florence Williams Library	36 (32.14%)	50 (44.64%)	26 (23.21%)	—	112
Ivanna Eudora Kean	38 (17.84%)	93 (43.66%)	82 (38.50%)	—	213
Joseph A. Gomez ES	81 (21.43%)	147 (38.77%)	149 (39.42%)	1 (0.26%)	378
Bertha C. Boschulte	40 (17.09%)	113 (48.29%)	80 (34.19%)	1 (0.43%)	234
CAHS Gym	104 (21.14%)	208 (42.28%)	177 (35.98%)	3 (0.61%)	492
Oswald Harris Court	33 (25.98%)	49 (38.58%)	45 (35.43%)	—	127
Winston Raymo Rec. Center	82 (34.75%)	84 (35.59%)	69 (29.24%)	1 (0.42%)	236
Gladys A. Abraham ES	170 (24.05%)	267 (37.77%)	269 (38.05%)	1 (0.14%)	707
Addelita Cancryn JHS	156 (22.54%)	270 (39.02%)	262 (37.86%)	4 (0.58%)	692
Joseph Sibilly ES - Bldg A	66 (22.84%)	119 (41.18%)	102 (35.29%)	2 (0.69%)	289
Joseph Sibilly ES - Bldg B	51 (23.72%)	72 (33.49%)	92 (42.79%)	—	215
Julius E. Sprauve ES	31 (16.32%)	79 (41.58%)	78 (41.05%)	2 (1.05%)	190
Guy Benjamin School	16 (37.21%)	12 (27.91%)	15 (34.88%)	—	43
Charles W. Turnbull Library	129 (17.53%)	280 (38.04%)	322 (43.75%)	5; 0.68%)	736
STT/STJ Absentee	111 (22.89%)	172 (35.46%)	200 (41.24%)	2 (0.41%)	485

== General election ==
=== Debates ===
2018 WTJX & League of Women Voters lieutenant gubernatorial debate
No.	Date	Host	Moderator	Link	Participants						
P Participant A Absent N Non-invitee I Invitee W Withdrawn											
P Participant A Absent N Non-invitee I Invitee W Withdrawn					Osbert Potter	Dwight Nicholson	Alicia "Chucky" Hansen	Ray Fonseca	Tregenza Roach	Hubert Frederick	Edgar Bengoa
1	October 17, 2018	WTJX-TV		PBS	P	P	P	P	P	P	P

2018 WTJX & League of Women Voters gubernatorial debate
No.	Date	Host	Moderator	Link	Participants						
P Participant A Absent N Non-invitee I Invitee W Withdrawn											
P Participant A Absent N Non-invitee I Invitee W Withdrawn					Kenneth Mapp	Soraya Diase Coffelt	Adlah Donastorg Jr.	Warren Mosler	Albert Bryan	Moleto Smith	Janette Millin-Young
1	October 18, 2018	WTJX-TV		PBS	P	P	P	P	P	P	P

=== Post-primary endorsements ===
Albert Bryan (D)
- Edgar Bengoa, 2018 candidate for lieutenant governor
- Adlah Donastorg Jr., former St. Thomas-St. John senator
- Alicia "Chucky" Hansen, St. Croix senator
- Marise James, attorney and 2018 candidate for lieutenant governor
- Ernest Morris Jr.
- Positive T. Nelson, St. Croix senator
- Stacey Plaskett, delegate to Congress
- Bill Richardson, former Governor of New Mexico (2003-2011)
- Samuel Sanes, St. Croix senator
- Hilda Solis, former US Secretary of Labor (2009-2013)
Kenneth Mapp (I)
- Ray Fonseca, 2018 candidate for lieutenant governor (Democratic)
- Nereida Rivera-O'Reilly, St. Croix senator

=== Polling ===
Poll source	Date(s) administered	Respondents	Sample size	Margin of error	Albert Bryan (D)	Kenneth Mapp (I)	Warren Mosler (I)	Adlah Donastorg (I)	Soraya Diase Coffelt (I)	Janette Millin Young (I)	Moleto A. Smith (I)	Undecided
VI Tech Stack	September 29-October 1, 2018	Territorial	800	–	23%	23%	7%	6%	5%	1%	1%	33%
VI Tech Stack	September 29-October 1, 2018	St. Thomas/St. John	-	-	29%	13%	4%	7%	8%	2%	2%	35%
VI Tech Stack	September 29-October 1, 2018	St. Croix	-	-	17%	32%	10%	5%	3%	1%	1%	32%
VI Tech Stack	October 27–30, 2018	Territorial	800	–	31%	25%	7%	11%	5%	2%	1%	18%

Poll source	School district	Date(s) administered	Albert Bryan & Tregenza Roach	Kenneth. Mapp & Osbert E. Potter	Janette Millin Young & Edgar Bengoa	Adlah Donastorg & Alicia Hansen	Soraya Coffelt & Dwight Nicholson	Warren Molser & Ray Fonseca	Moleto A. Smith & Hubert Fredrick
Joseph A. Gomez Elementary School	St. Thomas/St. John	November 5, 2018	113	73	63	47	37	9	9
Bertha C. Boschulte Middle School	St. Thomas/St. John		138	73	55	89	31	10	9
St. Croix Central High School	St. Croix		61	211	15	294	42	0	16
IEKHS	St. Thomas/St. John		171	48	60	75	34	10	10

=== Results ===
Candidate	Running mate	Party	First round		Second round	
Candidate	Running mate	Party	Votes	%	Votes	%
Albert Bryan Jr.	Tregenza Roach	Democratic Party	9,711	38.08	12,677	55.04
Kenneth Mapp	Osbert Potter	Independent	8,529	33.45	10,288	44.67
Adlah Donastorg	Alicia "Chucky" Hansen	Independent	4,201	16.47		
Warren Mosler	Ray Fonseca	Independent	1,199	4.70		
Soraya Diase Coffelt	Dwight Nicholson	Independent	1,195	4.69		
Moleto A. Smith	Hubert Frederick	Independent	400	1.57		
Janette Millin Young	Edgar Bengoa	Independent	237	0.93		
Write in			29	0.11	67	0.29
Total			25,501	100.00	23,032	100.00
Total votes			26,346	–	23,166	–
Registered voters/turnout			51,095	51.56	51,095	45.34

==== By district ====
District	Bryan	Mapp	Donastorg (I)	Mosler (I)	Diase-Coffelt (I)	Smith (I)	Millin-Young (I)	Write-in	Total
St. Croix	First round: 1,520 (22.72%) Second round: 3,838 (34.90%)	First round: 3,320 (49.93%) Second round: 7,133 (64.86%)	1,023 (15.29%)	470 (7.03%)	238 (3.56%)	54 (0.81%)	33 (0.49%)	First round: 11 (0.16%) Second round: 26 (0.24%)	First round: 6,669; Second round: 10,997
St. Thomas/St. John	First round: 2,679 (42.51%) Second round: 7,958 (74.86%)	First round: 1,258 (25.52%) Second round: 2,633 (24.77%)	1,608 (19.96%)	314 (4.98%)	221 (3.51%)	138 (2.19%)	79 (1.25%)	First round: 5 (0.08%) Second round: 40 (0.38%)	First round: 6,301; Second round: 10,591

==== By precinct ====
Precinct	Bryan	Mapp	Donastorg	Molser	Coffelt	Smith	Young	Write-in	Total
Alexander Henderson ES	First round: 319; Second round: 372	First round: 675; Second round: 775	147	53	43	6	5	First round: 2 Second round: 4	First round: 1,250; Second round: 1,151
Claude O. Markoe ES	First round: 247; Second round: 294	First round:470 Second round: 570	104	38	34	4	4	First round: — Second round: 3	First round: 901; Second round: 867
Evelyn Williams ES	First round: 236; Second round: 323	First round: 532; Second round: 685	167	70	22	11	6	First round: 1 Second round: 5	First round: 1,045; Second round: 1,013
St. Croix Educational Complex	First round: 263; Second round: 307	First round: 534; Second round: 682	144	59	42	8	3	First round: 1 Second round: 3	First round: 1,054; Second round: 992
Eulalie R. Rivera ES	First round: 194; Second round: 252	First second: 439; Second round: 527	100	52	22	5	5	First round: 2 Second round: 3	First round: 819; Second round: 782
Alfredo Andrews ES	First round: 119; Second round: 177	First round: 259; Second round: 357	104	23	22	2	6	First round: — Second round: —	First round: 535; Second round: 534
Ricardo Richards ES	First round: 310; Second round: 353	First round: 577; Second round: 727	137	51	44	16	3	First round: 4 Second round: —	First round: 1,142; Second round: 1,080
Lew Muckle ES	First round: 219; Second round: 292	First round: 587; Second round: 700	148	37	27	7	5	First round: — Second round: 2	First round: 1,030; Second round: 994
Juanita Gardine ES	First round: 299; Second round: 368	First round: 513; Second round: 585	136	81	35	8	9	First round: 1 Second round: 2	First round: 1,082; Second round: 955
John F. Kennedy Terrace	First round: 65; Second round: 97	First round: 173; Second round: 232	69	17	8	3	1	First round: 1 Second round: —	First round: 337; Second round: 329
Elena L. Christian JHS	First round: 328; Second round: 413	First round: 524; Second round: 619	131	87	50	9	5	First round: 3 Second round: 2	First round: 1,137; Second round: 1,034
Pearl B. Larsen ES	First round: 338; Second round: 445	First round: 396 Second round: 461	71	180	51	10	7	First round: — Second round: 1	First round: 907; Second round: 1,053
Florence A. Williams Library	First round: 91; Second round: 145	Second round: 186; Second round: 213	65	22	16	4	4	First round: 1 Second round: 1	First round: 389; Second round: 359
Ivanna Eudora Kean HS	First round: 317; Second round: 417	First round: 142; Second round: 153	135	37	39	27	4	First round: 3 Second round: 1	First round: 704; Second round: 571
Joseph Gomez ES	First round: 448; Second round: 592	First round: 205; Second round: 202	204	22	62	23	9	First round: 1 Second round: 3	First round: 974; Second round: 797
Bertha C. Boschulte	First round: 321; Second round: 497	First round: 156; Second round: 178	260	24	32	20	8	First round: — Second round: 4	First round: 821; Second round: 679
CAHS Gym	First round:638 Second round: 798	First round: 290; Second round: 305	258	33	64	25	20	First round: — Second round: 2	First round: 1,328; Second round: 1,105
Oswald Harris Court	First round: 138; Second round: 194	First round: 71; Second round: 82	71	8	14	5	9	First round: — Second round: 2	First round: 316; Second round: 278
Winston Raymo Rec. Center	First round: 335; Second round: 426	First round: 94; Second round: 125	137	16	34	18	9	First round: 1 Second round: 4	First round: 644; Second round: 555
Gladys A. Abraham ES	First round: 945; Second round: 1,122	First round: 333; Second round: 399	308	36	103	42	22	First round: 3 Second round: 8	First round: 1,792; Second round: 1,529
Addelita Cancryn JHS	First round: 868; Second round: 1,115	First round: 362; Second round: 393	402	31	102	43	36	First round: — Second round: —	First round: 1,844; Second round: 1,508
Joseph Sibilly ES	First round:805 Second round: 937	First round: 195; Second round: 198	134	95	111	24	9	First round: 1 Second round: 4	First round: 1,374; Second round: 1,139
Charles W. Turnbull Regional Library	First round: 924; Second round: 1,189	First round: 337; Second round: 404	440	37	98	52	26	First round: 2 Second round: 9	First round: 1,916; Second round: 1,602
Julius E. Sprauve ES	First round: 380; Second round: 525	First round: 167; Second round: 178	123	34	54	7	5	First round: 2 Second round: 2	First round: 772; Second round: 705
Guy Benjamin School	First round: 115; Second round: 146	First round: 13; Second round: 16	18	25	18	3	5	First round: 1 Second round: —	First round: 197; Second round: 184
STX Absentee	First round: 145; Second round: 0	83; Second round: 0	39	10	9	2	1	First round: — Second round: 0	First round: 0 Second round: 0
STX Provisional	First round: 0 Second round: 0	First round: 4 Second round: 0	2	3	—	—	—	First round: 0 Second round: 0	First round: 9 Second round: 0
STT/STJ Absentee	First round: 308; Second round: 0	First round: 88; Second round: 0	92	15	31	13	11	First round: — Second round: —	First round: 558; Second round: 0
STT/STJ Provisional	First round: 58; Second round: —	First round: 22; Second round: —	55	3	8	3	—	First round: — Second round: —	First round: 149; Second round: —
