= Kenneth Mapp =

American politician (born 1955)

Ken Mapp
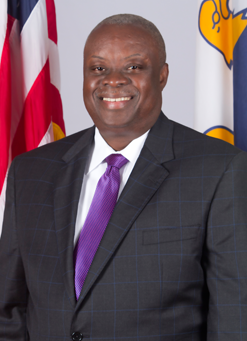

8th Governor of the United States Virgin Islands
- In office January 5, 2015 – January 7, 2019
- Lieutenant: Osbert Potter
- Preceded by: John DeJongh
- Succeeded by: Albert Bryan Jr.

7th Lieutenant Governor of the United States Virgin Islands
- In office January 2, 1995 – January 4, 1999
- Governor: Roy Schneider
- Preceded by: Derek Hodge
- Succeeded by: Gerard Luz James

Member of the Virgin Islands Legislature from the St. Croix district
- In office January 11, 1993 – January 2, 1995
- In office January 1989 – May 1989
- In office January 1983 – January 1985

Personal details
- Born: Kenneth Ezra Mapp; November 2, 1955 (age 70) New York City, New York, U.S.
- Party: Republican (before 2000); Independent (2000–present)
- Education: New York City College of Technology (attended); University of the Virgin Islands (attended); Harvard University (MPA)

Kenneth Ezra "Ken" Mapp (born November 2, 1955) is an American politician who served as the eighth governor of the United States Virgin Islands, from 2015 to 2019. Though a registered Republican, Mapp was elected Governor in 2014 as an independent. From 1995 to 1999, Mapp served as the seventh lieutenant governor of the United States Virgin Islands, and had previously served for three terms in the Legislature of the Virgin Islands.

Mapp was an independent candidate for Governor in 2006 and 2010, but was defeated both times by Democrat John de Jongh. He was elected Governor in 2014, defeating Donna Christian-Christensen, the longtime Delegate to Congress, in a run-off election. Mapp ran for a second term in 2018, but was defeated in the runoff election by Democrat Albert Bryan.

== Early life and education ==
Kenneth Ezra Mapp was born on November 2, 1955, in Brooklyn, New York, to Al Mapp and Vashti Hewitt Mapp, both from St. Croix. He was one of four siblings. Mapp moved to Saint Croix in the U.S. Virgin Islands in 1961, where he was raised by his maternal grandmother, Almina N. Hewitt, in Estate Rattan. He graduated from St. Croix Central High School in 1973.

Mapp has attended New York City Community College of City University of New York and the University of the Virgin Islands, but has not earned a bachelor's degree. After leaving office as lieutenant governor in 1999, however, he completed the six-week Advanced Management Program at Harvard Business School (which has no formal educational requirements) and received a master's degree in public administration from the John F. Kennedy School of Government at Harvard University. Mapp also completed other fellowships at Harvard University and Carnegie Mellon University in Pittsburgh.

== Career ==
Mapp has worked as a police trainee in New York City and a police officer in the U.S. Virgin Islands. He joined the New York City Police Department soon after graduating from high school in 1973 and was based in the 83rd Police Precinct in Brooklyn. He later became a police officer in the U.S. Virgin Islands and was elected president of the U.S. Virgin Islands Police Benevolent Association.

Mapp was elected as a senator in the Virgin Islands Legislature in three separate elections. Mapp was elected to the 15th Legislature of the Virgin Islands in 1982, his first elected office. He would later be elected as a senator in the 18th and 20th Legislatures as well. He chaired the Committee on Public Safety and Judicial Affairs and was a standing member on the Committee on Finance. Additionally, Mapp held other positions within the U.S. Virgin Islands government. He served as the assistant director of the Industrial Development Commission, which later became the Economic Development Authority. Mapp also became the director of the Consumer Services Administration, which is now the Department of Licensing and Consumer Affairs.

In 1994, gubernatorial candidate Roy L. Schneider chose Mapp as his running mate for lieutenant governor in the election. Schneider and Mapp jointly campaigned as independent candidates. Schneider and Mapp were elected Governor and Lt. Governor in a special gubernatorial runoff election held on November 22, 1994. They defeated the Democratic gubernatorial ticket, which consisted of then-Lt. Gov. Derek M. Hodge and his running mate, Alfred O. Heath.

Governor Roy Schneider and Lt. Governor Kenneth Mapp were inaugurated to a four-year term on January 2, 1995. However, Schneider and Mapp had a publicly strained relationship while in office and the two often did not speak to one another during their four-year tenure. Schneider and Mapp did not seek re-election in 1999. Instead, Schneider ran with Finance Commissioner Juan Centeno as his running mate and they were defeated in the election by Democratic candidate Charles Turnbull and his running mate, Gerard Luz James, who were sworn in on January 4, 1999.

After leaving office as lieutenant governor, Mapp earned a master's degree in public administration from Harvard University's John F. Kennedy School of Government and completed the Advanced Management Program (AMP 159) at Harvard Business School. Though he ran for lieutenant governor as independent, Mapp had changed his party affiliation from Republican by 2001. Mapp did not run for governor in 2002. He campaigned for Governor Turnbull who was re-elected to a second term.

In 2002, Governor Charles Turnbull appointed Mapp as the Virgin Island's Public Finance Authority's Director of finance and administration. Mapp raised millions of dollars for the government and Hovensa, the territory's largest private sector employer. The Public Finance Authority acquired its first ever investment grade ratings on VI government-backed securities during Mapp's tenure. Mapp also managed several major capital projects and served on the Governor's financial and budget team. Mapp participated in budget hearings and prepared a variety of detailed analysis and reports. The Governor's financial team worked closely with department heads and legislators to develop and gain legislative approval of the annual territorial budgets.

In 2006, Mapp announced his candidacy for governor as an independent candidate with former Senator at Large Almando Liburd as his running mate. His two main opponents were businessman John De Jongh and Senator Adlah Donastorg. In the general election, de Jongh won 15,914 votes which equalled 49.33% of the total vote, Mapp won 9,100 of the total votes (equalling 26.78 percent) and Donastorg earned 7,871 votes, or 23.16 percent of the votes cast. De Jongh and Mapp, the two top candidates in terms of votes, were forced into a second runoff election on November 21, 2006, since no candidate earned more than 50% of the total votes cast. In the 2006 gubernatorial runoff, De Jongh was elected Governor with 16,644 votes (57.30%), while Mapp came in second, garnering 12,402 votes (42.70%).

=== 2010 gubernatorial election ===
Mapp formally announced his candidacy for Governor of the U.S. Virgin Islands in the 2010 gubernatorial election on August 20, 2010, at his headquarters on Saint Thomas. Mapp, who is running as an independent rather than a Republican, picked Malik Sekou, a professor and department chair at the University of the Virgin Islands, as his running mate for lieutenant governor.

Mapp's main campaign platform included reducing crime and improving education in the U.S. Virgin Islands. Mapp promised to construct a technical school, promote economic growth while protecting the environment and pursue cleaner forms of energy if elected. The general election took place on November 2, 2010. Incumbent governor John de Jongh defeated Mapp in the election to win a second term in office. De Jongh earned 17,535 votes, or 56.27% of the vote, while Mapp came in second with 13,580 votes, or 43.58% of the vote. Mapp initially refused to concede, citing possible voting irregularities and the advice from his campaign advisor.

=== 2014 gubernatorial election ===
Mapp ran for Governor of the U.S. Virgin Islands in the 2014 gubernatorial election, choosing Osbert Potter, a former Virgin Islands senator as his running mate. The general election was held on November 4, 2014. He received 47.47% of the vote, but since no candidate received the required 50%+1 as required by the Revised Organic Act of the Virgin Islands, a runoff was held between him and Donna Christian-Christensen, the two top vote receivers. The runoff was held on November 18, 2014, two weeks after the general election. Mapp went on to win the run-off election, receiving almost 64% of the vote.

=== 2018 gubernatorial election ===
Mapp ran for reelection but lost with 44.67 percent of the vote to Albert Bryan's 55.04 percent in a run-off election.

== Political career ==
Mapp was sworn in as the 8th elected Governor of the U.S. Virgin Islands on January 5, 2015. Upon taking office, Mapp requested $1 million to file a lawsuit against Hovensa. He later signed legislation appropriating $1 million to further take legal action towards Hess Oil and PDVSA. To combat rising crime in the territory, Mapp formed alliance between the New York City Police Department and the Virgin Islands Police Department. In addition, VIPD officers were sent to New York for training and mentorship. Mapp signed an executive order allowing same-sex marriage in the U.S. Virgin Islands following a U.S. Supreme Court's decision. In July 2015, Mapp became a member of the NGA's Committee on Economic Development. His administration moved to sue HESS Corporation for $1.5 billion given the refinery immediate closure. Mapp created the Virgin Islands Climate Change Council through executive order. In December 2015, Mapp began an agreement with ArcLight Partners, LLC, to operate the oil storage terminal of Hovensa refinery.

Mapp implemented salary increases for government employees while his administration focused on raising the minimum wage from $7.25 to $10.50 over a three-year period. Worked with Sinopec on St. Croix oil refinery and met with Air China officials to attract Chinese tourists to the territory. In February 2017, Mapp faced a government fiscal crisis with over $2 billion in debt and a structural deficit of $110 million. Mapp provided the federal Medicaid program to all eligible Virgin Islands residents, giving vital health care access to many families who lacked health insurance and access to basic health care services. On September 5, 2017, Mapp declared a state of emergency in preparations for Hurricane Irma which was followed by Hurricane Maria thirteen days later. He met President Donald Trump on a ship off Puerto Rico. Within ten months of the storms, over 130 members of Congress led by then House Minority Leader Nancy Pelosi were in the USVI seeing firsthand of the devastation. Mapp was successful in persuading Congress and received bipartisan support for several unprecedented amendments to the Stafford Act as well as an estimated $9 billion of federal funds for the recovery and rebuilding of the territory. Mapp recruited local and national nonprofit organizations to join the recovery effort, including the American Red Cross, Bloomberg Philanthropies, the Clinton Global Initiative, and the Kenny Chesney Foundation. He also appealed help for the territory and received personnel and resources from his fellow governors Andrew Cuomo, Chris Christie, and Larry Hogan.

Major capital projects funded by the federal government started under Mapp tenure, such as the Veterans Drive Improvement Project and the Bridge To NowHere. Mapp offered free tuition to all local high school graduates attending the University of the Virgin Islands.

=== Cabinet ===
Chief of Staff	Eugene Farrell; Randolph "Randy" Knight (2015-2016)
Chief Legal Counsel	Emile Henderson III
Director of Communications	Kevin Williams; Sam Topp; Cherie Munchez; Nicole Bollentini; Kimberly Jones

Agency	Commissioner/Director
Department of Finance	Clarina Modeste-Elliott (acting); Valdamier Collens (2015-2018)
OMB	Julio Rhymer; Nellon Bowry (2015-2017)
Department of Education	Dionne Wells-Hendrington (acting); Sharon McCollum (2015-2018)
Department of Sports, Parks & Recreation	Calvert White (acting); Pedro Cruz (2015-2018)
Department of Public Works	Nelson Petty (2017-2019); Gustav James (2015-2017)
Department of Justice	Claude Walker; Soraya Diase Coffelt (2015-2015)
Department of Labor	Averil George (2018-2019); Catherine Hendry, Esq (2015-2018)
Bureau of Internal Revenue	Marvin Pickering (2015-2019)
Department of Property & Procurement	Lloyd Bough Jr. (2017-2019); Timothy Lake (acting); Randolph Bennett (2015-2017)
Virgin Islands Police Department	Jason Marsh (acting); Delroy Richards (2015-2018)
Department of Tourism	Beverly Nicholson-Doty (2007-2018)
Department of Human Services	Felicia Blyden (2017-2019); Anita Roberts; Vivian Ebbesen-Fludd; Richard Lacombe (acting)
Department of Health	Michelle Davis
Department of Personnel	Milton E. Potter (2015-2019)
Bureau of Motor Vehicles	Lawrence Olive (2015-2019)
Virgin Islands Fire Department	Clifford Joseph
Office of Veteran Affairs	Patrick Farrell (2015-2019)
Bureau of Corrections	Rick Mullgrav
Department of Agriculture	Carlos Robles (2015-2019)
Department of Planning & Natural Resources	Dawn Henry (2015-2019)
Virgin Islands Energy Office	Elmo Roebuck Jr. (2015-2019)
Bureau of Information Technology	Angelo Riddick (2016-2019); Jesus Caban (acting); Reuben Molloy (2015-2016)
Office of Collective Bargaining	Natalie Nelson Tang How (2016-2019); Joss Springette (acting); Dr. Valdemar A. Hill, Jr (2015-2015)
VITEMA	Mona Barnes (2015-2018)
Department of Licensing & Consumer Affairs	Devin Carrington (2015-2019)
Law Enforcement Planning Commission	Franz Christian
Virgin Islands National Guard	Deborah Howell (2015-2019)

== Post-gubernatorial career ==
In a 2023 deposition, Mapp stated he met with Jeffrey Epstein for lunch on Little St. James, while as governor. He also said Epstein never received special treatment from him and he was not aware of the late convicted sex offender crimes. On 30 January 2026, the U.S. Justice Department released documents where Mapp once suggested to Epstein if he would be interested in lending $275 million to the V.I. government in July 2016 and separately sought $50,000 to fund his PAC during the 2018 gubernatorial election.

Political offices
Preceded by Derek Hodge	Lieutenant Governor of the United States Virgin Islands; 1995–1999	Succeeded by Gerard Luz James
Preceded by John de Jongh	Governor of the United States Virgin Islands; 2015–2019	Succeeded by Albert Bryan
