= 2010 United States Virgin Islands gubernatorial election =

- November 2, 2010
- Turnout: 66.54%
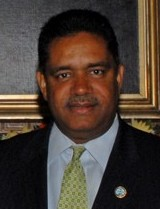

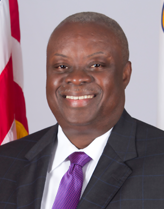
Nominee	John de Jongh	Kenneth Mapp
Party	Democratic	Independent
Running mate	Gregory Francis	Malik Sekou
Popular vote	18,645	14,167
Percentage	56.76%	43.13%
Governor before election
John de Jongh
Democratic
Elected Governor
John de Jongh
Democratic

The 2010 U.S. Virgin Islands gubernatorial election was held on November 2, 2010, and won by incumbent Democratic Governor John de Jongh. De Jongh was elected to his first term in 2006 with 57% of the vote over Kenneth Mapp.

Governor John de Jongh was elected to a second, full year-term, over independent Kenneth Mapp, in what was essentially a rematch of the 2006 gubernatorial runoff election.

== Candidates ==
=== Democratic ===
- Governor: John de Jongh incumbent Governor (first elected in 2006)
  - Lieutenant Governor: Gregory Francis, incumbent Lieutenant Governor of the U.S. Virgin Islands

==== Defeated in primary ====
- Adlah Donastorg Jr., seven-term U.S. Virgin Islands Senator (since January 1995); 2006 candidate for governor. Donastorg announced his candidacy on July 25, 2010.
  - Samuel Baptiste, Donastorg's running mate Baptiste worked as an assistant commissioner of Property and Procurement under former Governor Roy Schneider. He was also a 2002 candidate for governor as a Republican.
- Gerard Luz James II, former Lieutenant Governor and president of the fifth Constitutional Convention
  - Glen J. Smith, James' running mate, teacher and educator
- James O'Bryan Jr., two-term chairman of the Democratic Party of the Virgin Islands, former Senator, and Administrator of Saint Thomas and Water Island
  - Pamela Richards Samuel, O'Bryan's running mate, former Commissioner of Tourism

=== Independent ===
- Kenneth Mapp, former Lieutenant Governor; gubernatorial candidate in 2006
  - Dr. Malik Sekou, Mapp's running mate. Sekeu is a political science professor and department chair at the University of the Virgin Islands. He has written on history, social science and political science. He had previously been elected to the Virgin Islands Board of Education.

=== Independent Citizens Movement ===
==== Withdrew ====
- Terrence "Positive" Nelson, U.S. Virgin Islands Senator, member of the Independent Citizens Movement (ICM) party

=== Republican ===
- None

== Democratic primaries ==
The gubernatorial primary was held on Saturday, September 11, 2010. The only contested primary was for the Democratic nomination.

In the four-way Democratic primary, incumbent Governor John de Jongh and Lieutenant Governor Gregory Francis won the nomination with 7,981 votes (53%). Senator Adlah Donastorg Jr., who ran against de Jongh in 2006, placed second with 4,526 votes. Former Lieutenant Governor Gerard Luz James came in third place in the primary with 1,936 votes, while James O'Bryan Jr. placed fourth with 465 votes.

Governor John de Jongh garnered more votes than all three of his Democratic challengers combined, who together earned 6,555 votes. In response to his 53% victory, de Jongh stated, "The combination of their votes by no means comes close to what we achieved this evening ... That feels very good." Second place candidate Senator Adlah Donastorg left the Virgin Islands Legislature when his term expired in January 2011, after seven terms in office. He told the Virgin Islands Daily News that he will return to the private sector after the election.

Former Lieutenant Governor Gerard Luz James, told the media he "accepted the people's decision," but also added in response to the election, "The people of the Virgin Islands showed me today that they really and truly endure mistreatment, endure corruption, endure mismanagement, and they also endure maltreatment to each other ... The only thing that I can see is continued destruction, and it's sad, sad, sad." James stated that he would not endorse Governor de Jongh for a second term stating, "Why should I endorse anyone when it shows me truly that the people don't want to have anything that is right?" James O'Bryan, who with running mate Pamela Richards Samuel received 432 votes, said, "The people have spoken, I respect their wishes, and I will go forward with this episode from now on." With the completion of the Democratic primary, Governor John de Jongh went on to face independent candidate Kenneth Mapp in the general election on November 2, 2010. de Jongh won the Election with 56.27% of the vote.

=== Results ===
Candidate	Running mate	Votes	%
John de Jongh	Gregory Francis	7,981	53.51
Adlah Donastorg	Samuel Baptiste	4,526	30.35
Gerard Luz James	Glen J. Smith	1,936	12.98
James O'Bryan Jr.	Pamela Richards Samuel	465	3.12
Write in		6	0.04
Total		14,914	100.00

== General election ==
The gubernatorial general election was held on November 2, 2010, with incumbent Governor John de Jongh being challenged by independent Kenneth Mapp, a former Lieutenant Governor of the U.S. Virgin Islands, for a second consecutive executive election. De Jongh had narrowly defeated Mapp in the 2006 gubernatorial runoff election.

The incumbent gubernatorial team of Gov. John de Jongh and Lt. Governor Gregory Francis won re-election to a second term in office, garnering 17,535 votes. The independent ticket of Kenneth Mapp and Malik Sekou placed second in the election, earning 13,580 votes. Mapp initially refused to concede despite trailing by a wide margin, citing voting irregularities.

Ralph T. O'Neal, the Premier of the neighboring British Virgin Islands, called Governor de Jongh on November 4, 2010, to congratulate on his re-election.

=== Endorsements ===
John de Jongh
- Barack Obama, the 44th President of the United States
- Tony Coelho, former Democratic congressman from California.
- Luz Luis, former First Lady and wife of Governor Juan Francisco Luis
- Virgin Islands Source
- St. Croix Avis

=== Polling ===
Poll source	Date(s) administered	Sample size	Margin of error	John de Jongh (D)	Kenneth Mapp (I)
N/A	October 24, 2010	-	-	52%	25%

==== Mock election results ====
Poll source	Date(s) administered	Sample size	Margin of error	John de Jongh (D)	Kenneth Mapp (I)
CAHS	October 2010	-	-	56%	44%

=== Results ===
Candidate	Running mate	Party	Votes	%
John de Jongh	Gregory Francis	Democratic Party	18,645	56.76
Kenneth Mapp	Malik Sekou	Independent	14,167	43.13
Write in			37	0.11
Total			32,849	100.00
Total votes			34,600	–
Registered voters/turnout			51,995	66.54

==== By district ====
District	DeJongh	Mapp	Write-in	Total
St. Croix	8,975	7,615	15	16,605
St. Thomas/St. John	9,670	6,552	22	16,244

==== By precinct ====
Precinct	DeJongh	Mapp	Write-in	Total
Addelita Cancryn School	564	410	3	977
Alexander Henderson School I	477	506	—	983
Alexander Henderson School II	452	508	1	961
Alfredo Andrews	502	389	—	891
Bertha C. Boschulte Cafeteria	536	417	3	956
CAHS Annex	576	401	—	977
CAHS Cafeteria	321	305	2	628
Charles Enamuel I	374	360	—	734
Charles Enamuel II	262	267	—	529
Claude O. Markoe	317	357	3	677
Curriculum Center	1,282	936	5	2,223
Dober School North	235	254	—	489
Dober School South	257	171	2	430
Elena Christian	831	555	3	1,389
Eulalie Rivera School	605	579	—	1,184
Evelyn Williams I	408	368	—	776
Evelyn Williams II	344	327	—	671
Florence Williams Library	300	284	—	584
Gladys Abraham Cafeteria	875	532	2	1,409
Guy Benjamin School	141	80	1	222
Ivanna Eudora Kean Cafeteria	409	240	—	649
John F. Kennedy	263	305	—	568
Joseph Gomez Cafeteria	772	689	5	1,466
Joseph Sibilly School A	662	241	—	903
Joseph Sibilly School B	425	131	2	558
Juanita Gardine I	384	300	1	685
Juanita Gardine II	404	291	—	695
Julius E. Sprauve Cafeteria	410	402	3	815
Lew Muckle	694	702	1	1,397
Oswald Harris Court	220	190	—	410
Pearl B. Larsen	941	377	3	1,321
Ricardo Richards I	391	318	2	711
Ricardo Richards II	364	318	2	684
St. Gerards Hall	193	201	—	394
Ulla F. Muller Cafeteria	569	363	2	934
Ulla F. Muller (Rm18)	289	189	—	478
Winston Raymo North	231	154	—	385
Winston Raymo South	255	163	1	419
