= Malik Sekou =

United States Virgin Islands lawyer

Malik Sekou (born January 8, 1964, in St. Thomas, U.S. Virgin Islands) is an academic from the United States Virgin Islands. He is a professor and chairman of the Department of history, social science and political science at the University of the Virgin Islands. Sekou was chosen by Independent gubernatorial candidate Kenneth Mapp as his running mate for Lieutenant Governor of the United States Virgin Islands in the 2010 gubernatorial election.

== Biography ==
=== Early life ===
Malik Sekou was born on January 8, 1964, on Saint Thomas, United States Virgin Islands, to Wally and Margaret Whitehead. He has one older brother, Tony Wally Whitehead, and three younger siblings, Sylvia, Kankan and Marvin. Malik and his older brother were raised in foster care in Saint Thomas by Guillermo and Rosita Cyntje. His three younger siblings were raised in Brooklyn, New York. Sekou attended Kirwan Terrace Elementary School and Wayne Aspinall Junior High, which is now called Addelitta Cancryn Junior High School. He graduated from Charlotte Amalie High School in Charlotte Amalie in 1981.

Sekou served in the United States Navy beginning in September 1981. He was a member of the erations Specialists in the USS Voge FF-1047, before being honorably discharged in 1984. He returned to the United States Virgin Islands after his honorable discharge, where he began pursuing a bachelor's degree at the University of the Virgin Islands. He also joined the Virgin Islands Fire Service.

Sekou received a bachelor's degree in social science from the University of the Virgin Islands in 1989. He obtained both his master's degree and doctorate in political science from the University of Delaware.

=== Personal life ===
Sekou is married to Sheree Bryant. The couple have one daughter, Aisha Sekou.

=== Career ===
Sekou has worked as a professor at the University of the Virgin Islands for twelve years, as of 2010. He has written extensively on topics pertaining to the Virgin Islands and the Caribbean, including law enforcement, the cost of living in the Virgin Islands, immigration and Cuba. He has previously worked as a researcher and analyst for the Legislature of the Virgin Islands. Additionally, Sekou is known as a political consultant.

Sekou has been elected to the Virgin Islands Board of Education. He has unsuccessfully run for the Legislature of the Virgin Islands twice.

=== 2010 Candidacy for Lt. Governor ===
In July 2010, gubernatorial candidate Kenneth Mapp's Search Committee recommended Sekou as his running mate for Lieutenant Governor in the 2010 gubernatorial election.
