= C.A.H.S. Stadium =

Stadium in Charlotte Amalie, United States Virgin Islands

Coordinates: 18°20′28.18″N 64°55′08.62″W

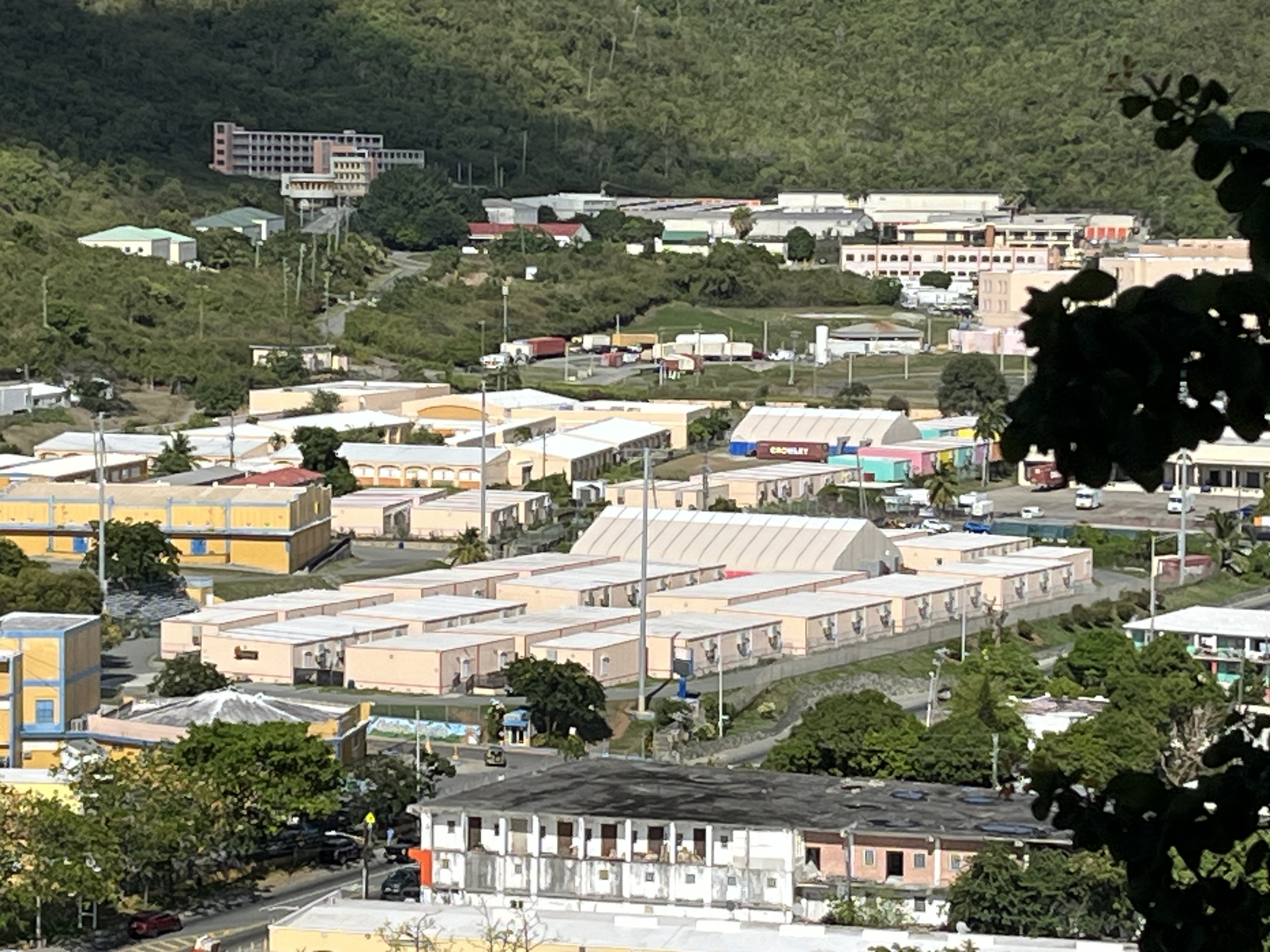
- Interactive map of C.A.H.S. Stadium
- Location: Charlotte Amalie, United States Virgin Islands
- Owner: Charlotte Amalie High School

Construction
- Opened: 1969

C.A.H.S. Stadium is a multi-use stadium in Charlotte Amalie, United States Virgin Islands. Stadium is owned by the Charlotte Amalie High School (C.A.H.S.). It is currently used mostly for soccer matches and athletics competitions.
