= Albert Bryan Jr. =

Governor of the United States Virgin Islands since 2019

Albert Bryan
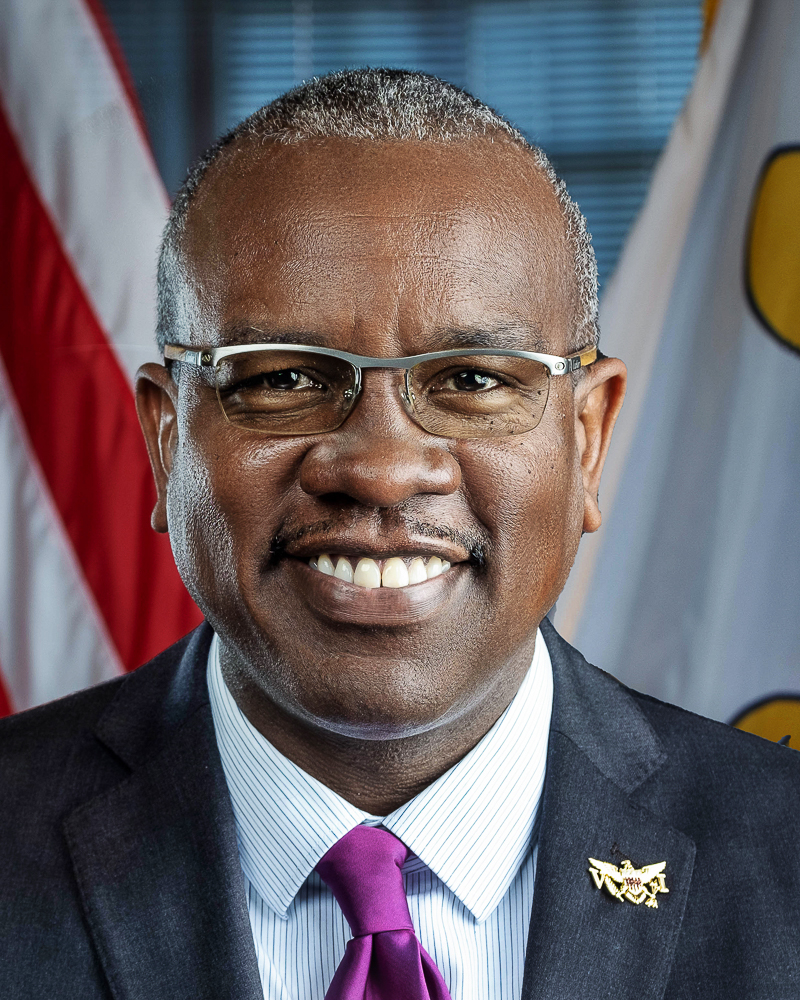
- Official portrait, 2019

9th Governor of the United States Virgin Islands
- Incumbent
- Assumed office January 7, 2019
- Lieutenant: Tregenza Roach
- Preceded by: Kenneth Mapp

Personal details
- Born: February 21, 1968 (age 58) St. Thomas, U.S. Virgin Islands
- Party: Democratic
- Spouse: Yolanda Cabodevilla (m. 1998; div. 2024)
- Children: 2
- Education: Wittenberg University (BA); University of the Virgin Islands (MBA)

Albert Bryan Jr. (born February 21, 1968) is a U.S. Virgin Islander politician and former businessman, serving since 2019 as the ninth governor of the United States Virgin Islands. A member of the Democratic Party, he served as Commissioner of Department of Labor under Governor John deJongh from May 3, 2007 to January 5, 2015.

== Early life and education ==
Bryan was born on the island of St. Thomas. He is the oldest of five sons to Albert Sr. and Genevieve Pilgrim-Bryan. He grew up in the Savan neighborhood of Charlotte Amalie, the territory's capital. As a teenager, Bryan moved to St. Croix, where he graduated from St. Dunstan's Episcopal High School in 1985. Bryan earned his BA in economics from Wittenberg University in 1989. He received a Master of Business Administration from the University of the Virgin Islands in 2003.

== Career ==
In 2007, Governor John de Jongh appointed him to be Commissioner of the Virgin Islands Department of Labor. When de Jongh's term ended in 2015, Bryan returned to the private sector. He was CEO and President of Aabra Group, a consulting firm, and Master Strategies, a recruiting firm. He also was executive director of the Virgin Islands chapter of Junior Achievement.

=== 2018 gubernatorial election ===
In April 2018, Bryan officially announced his candidacy for governor and chose Tregenza Roach as his running mate. They won the August 4 Democratic primary with 39.23% of the vote, defeating former Finance commissioner Angel E. Dawson Jr. and former Senator Allison "Allie" Petrus. The team campaigned on restoring trust to government, stabilizing the economy, modernizing infrastructure, education, healthcare, reducing crime and poverty, affordable housing, and attracting rum distilleries to rescue GERS. Bryan led the 2018 general election with 38% of the vote and defeated incumbent governor Kenneth Mapp in a runoff with over 55% of the vote. He is the second Democrat to unseat a sitting governor since Charles W. Turnbull in 1998.

=== 2022 gubernatorial election ===
Bryan launched his reelection bid on May 11, 2022. In the August 6 primary, he defeated Kent Bernier Sr. with 65.04% of the vote. He won the November 8 general election, defeating Senator Kurt Vialet and two other candidates with 56% of the vote.

== Political career ==
Bryan was sworn in as the 9th governor of the United States Virgin Islands by Rhys Hodge, Chief Justice of the Supreme Court of the Virgin Islands on January 7, 2019, at David Monsanto Bandstand, which was built by his grandfather Ulric “Sappy” Pilgrim in Emancipation Gardens on St. Thomas. Before the ceremony, Bryan and his family attended an inaugural Mass at Saints Peter and Paul Cathedral. The inauguration proceed with military parades and inaugural balls held on all three islands.

=== Governorship ===
Upon assuming office, Bryan announced his senior staff and pledged to fill his cabinet within 90 days. Early administrative actions included securing a FEMA extension for the STEP hurricane recovery program and declaring a mental healthcare state of emergency due to a territorial shortage of psychiatrists. On January 19, 2019, Bryan signed the Virgin Islands Medicinal Cannabis Patient Care Act into law, and later proposed legalizing recreational marijuana to generate revenue for the Government Employees' Retirement System (GERS), resubmitting the proposal in May 2020 after initial legislative resistance. In 2019, Bryan cleared all outstanding government debt to the Virgin Islands Water & Power Authority (WAPA) and purchased four new generators to combat rolling blackouts. In 2021, he filed suit to block legislation reducing the WAPA board's size, and in April 2024 declared a state of emergency for WAPA following widespread outages. In October 2022, Bryan announced the V.I. Slice homeownership program. On January 19, 2023, Bryan signed the Equality Act prohibiting discrimination based on sexual orientation or gender identity, and in 2024 introduced legislation allowing individuals to change their gender on identifying documents.

=== COVID-19 pandemic ===
Bryan declared a state of emergency on March 13, 2020, implementing business closures and travel testing requirements. In-person schooling was suspended for the remainder of the 2019–2020 school year.

What is your overall opinion on Governor Albert Bryan’s handling of COVID-19?
Poll source	Date(s) administered	Sample size	Margin of error	Respondents	Approve	Disapprove
VI Tech Stack	April 4–5, 2020	600	± 3.99%	Territory-wide; St. Thomas-St. John; St. Croix	59% 63% 54%	25% 25% 32%

== Jeffrey Epstein Litigation and Related Controversies ==
During his tenure as governor, Bryan faced significant scrutiny regarding his administration's handling of litigation involving Jeffrey Epstein and the territory's historical financial relationship with Epstein's entities.

=== Economic Development Commission (EDC) Tax Incentives ===
According to unsealed federal court filings from June 2023, Epstein's companies—specifically Southern Trust Company and Financial Trust Company—were granted approximately $300 million in tax benefits by the Virgin Islands government between 1999 and 2018. The filings detailed that $219.8 million in benefits were awarded between 1999 and 2012, followed by an additional $80.6 million from 2013 to 2018. Bryan concurrently served as the Commissioner of the Virgin Islands Department of Labor and as the Chairman of the Virgin Islands Economic Development Authority (EDA) Board from 2007 to 2015, the body responsible for overseeing the certification of these tax incentives.

=== Attorney General Transitions and Allegations of Interference ===
Bryan's administration oversaw the departure of three successive Attorneys General during the height of the territory's litigation against Epstein's estate and his financial partners.

- 2026 FBI Release: According to a four-page FBI interview memorandum released on January 30, 2026, former Attorney General Denise George alleged that Bryan had pressured her regarding Epstein's sex offender status within two weeks of her 2019 appointment. The memo quotes a text message from Bryan stating, "you need to make a decision on the Epstein matter," in reference to Epstein's request for a waiver from travel reporting requirements. George further alleged that Bryan expressed anger that she was "going after people who are members of our team" and later instructed her to settle the estate litigation for $80 million, a figure significantly lower than the $105 million she eventually secured.
- Termination of Denise George: On December 31, 2022, Bryan terminated George four days after she filed a major lawsuit against JPMorgan Chase for allegedly facilitating Epstein's sex-trafficking operation. Bryan publicly stated he was "blindsided" by the lawsuit and asserted that no attorney general should file such an action without notifying the Governor's office.
- Successive Resignations: Following George's firing, Acting Attorney General Carol Thomas-Jacobs executed a January 2023 settlement agreement with billionaire Leon Black that granted him a "total release" from all territory claims, including unknown future claims. Shortly after the settlement was finalized, Bryan appointed Thomas-Jacobs to a lifetime judgeship on the Superior Court of the Virgin Islands. Her successor, Ariel K. Smith, resigned in March 2024 at Bryan's "specific request," a move the Governor characterized as a lack of "philosophical alignment" between his office and the Department of Justice.

=== JPMorgan "Unclean Hands" Defense ===
In federal court filings, JPMorgan Chase pursued an "unclean hands" defense, alleging that the USVI government actively harbored and shielded Epstein for two decades. The bank's filings differentiated between individuals connected to separate administrations, noting that Cecile de Jongh, wife of former Governor John de Jongh, had served as the office manager for Epstein's Southern Trust Company for eight years. The filings further alleged that the Governor's former wife, Yolanda Bryan, had been involved in efforts to procure student visas for individuals associated with Epstein during Bryan's tenure.

== Administrative and Legal Controversies ==
Beyond the Epstein litigation, Bryan's administration has faced separate ethical and legal challenges regarding local procurement and campaign finance.

In 2020, the Bryan administration was criticized for attempting to award a $1 million no-bid contract for COVID-19 contact tracing to Avera Tech, a startup co-founded by his daughter, Aliyah Bryan, and a former campaign intern. Senators criticized the Health Department for circumventing standard procurement processes, and the contract was ultimately dropped following public outcry and a legislative probe.

In 2023, the Elections System of the Virgin Islands fined the Bryan-Roach campaign $2,000 for holding an illegal "international virtual fundraiser" in September 2022. The event featured the Prime Minister of Dominica, Roosevelt Skerrit, as a "special guest," violating Title 18 of the V.I. Code, which prohibits foreign officials from fundraising or endorsing U.S. candidates.

In November 2023, Bryan filed for divorce from his wife, Yolanda Bryan, and successfully petitioned the V.I. Superior Court to seal the case in its entirety. The decision to remove case ST-2023-DI-00113 from the public docket faced scrutiny because the presiding judge was up for reappointment to the bench by the Governor in 2024.

== Cabinet ==
=== Government House Staff ===
Chief of Staff	Kevin Williams; Karl Knight (2019-2024)
Chief Legal Counsel	Richard Evangelista; David Bornn (2019-2022)
Director of Communications	Richard Motta

Agency	Commissioner/Director
Department of Finance	Kevin McCurdy; Clarina Modeste-Elliott (acting); Bosede Bruce (2021–2023); Kirk Callwood (2019–2020)
OMB	Julio Rhymer; Kimika Woods (acting); Jenifer O’Neal (2019–2024)
Department of Education	Dionne Wells-Hendrington; Racquel Berry-Benjamin (2019–2022)
Department of Sports, Parks & Recreation	Vincent Roberts (acting); Calvert White (2019–2025)
Department of Public Works	Derek Gabriel; Nelson Petty (2015–2021)
Department of Justice	Gordon C. Rhea; Ian Clement (acting); Ariel Smith (2023–2024); Carol Thomas-Jacobs (acting); Denise George (2019–2023)
Department of Labor	Gary Molloy
Bureau of Internal Revenue	Joel Lee
Department of Property & Procurement	Lisa Alejandro; Anthony Thomas (2019–2023)
Virgin Islands Police Department	Mario Brooks; Ray Martinez (2021–2024); Trevor Velinor (2019–2021)
Department of Tourism	Jenifer Matarangas-King (2025-present); Joseph Boschulte (2019–2025)
Department of Human Services	Averil George; Kimberley Causey-Gomez (2019–2023)
Department of Health	Justa Encarnacion
Department of Personnel	Cindy Richardson; Dayna Clendinen (2019–2021)
Bureau of Motor Vehicles	Barbara McIntosh
Virgin Islands Fire Department	Antonio Stevens; Darryl George (2019–2023)
Office of Veteran Affairs	Patrick Farrell
Bureau of Corrections	Wynnie Testamark
Department of Agriculture	Dr. Louis Petersen; Positive Nelson (2019–2023)
Department of Planning & Natural Resources	Jean Pierre Oriol
Virgin Islands Energy Office	Michael Jaffurs (2026-present); Kyle Fleming (2019-2026)
Bureau of Information Technology	Rupert Ross
Office of Collective Bargaining	Joss Springette
VITEMA	Daryl Jaschen
Department of Licensing & Consumer Affairs	Nathalie Hodge; Richard Evangelista (2019–2023)
Law Enforcement Planning Commission	Moleto Smith; Angela Campbell (2021–2024); Ray Martinez (2019–2021)
Virgin Islands National Guard	Col. Kodjo Knox-Limbacker

=== Proposed legislation ===
- January 28, 2019: A bill allowing the attorney general to serve for six-year terms.
- October 25, 2019: The Virgin Islands Emergency Medical Services System Act to merge Fire Services with EMS.
- December 2, 2019: An amendment called “Virgin Islands Cannabis Use Act” to the enacted Medicinal Cannabis Patient Care Act
- January 16, 2020: The Virgin Islands Behavioral Health and Developmental Disability Act
- May 19, 2020: Virgin Islands Cannabis Use Act (resubmitted amended version to 33rd Legislature)
- August 11, 2020: Matching Fund Securitization Act
- August 15, 2022: A bill to increase the amount of funding for retroactive wages from $25 million to $40 million to repay government employees. (Senate approved: 08/30/2022; enacted by governor: 09/16/2022)

=== Travels ===
No.	Date(s)	Destination	Reason
1	January 17–18, 2019	Miami, Florida	Met with cruise ship executives of Carnival Corporation, Royal Caribbean, Norwegian Cruise Line Holdings, Disney Cruise Line, and MSC Cruises
2	January 29–30, 2019	San Juan, Puerto Rico	Clinton Global Initiative (CGI) Action Network meeting on Post-Disaster Recovery
3	February 21–27, 2019	Washington, D.C.	NGA Winter meeting
4	March 26, 2019	Puerto Rico	Visited FEMA Distribution Center in Bayamon and met with Governor Ricardo Rosselló in San Juan.
5	April 4–11, 2019	Miami, Florida, Washington, D.C.	Seatrade Cruise Global Conference in Miami and met with FEMA Administrator Peter Gaynor in Washington, D.C.
6	May 8, 2019	Atlanta, Georgia	Met with Delta Air Lines
7	May 21–23, 2019	Miami, Florida	Caribbean Hotel & Resort Investment Summit
8	June 29–30, 2019	St. Kitts	St. Kitts Music Festival
9	July 7–9, 2019	Orlando, Florida	Met with Margaritaville Enterprises
10	July 15–16, 2019	West Palm Beach	Met with Cigna
11	September 20–22, 2019	Washington, D.C.	Meetings with federal agencies
12	October 25-November 9, 2019	Washington, D.C.	Meetings with members of Congress and federal agencies
13	December 5–9, 2019	Washington, D.C.	Job for America's Graduates annual meeting
14	February 4, 2020	Tortola	Inter-Virgin Islands Council conference
15	February 7–11, 2020	Washington, D.C.	NGA Winter meeting
16	July 8–12, 2021	Atlanta, Georgia	Hosted a government job recruitment fair for Virgin Islanders living abroad to return home.
17	July 27-August 1, 2021	Miami, Florida	Met with transportation and shipping companies
18	October 23–29, 2021	Denver, Colorado	To learn about the cannabis industry
19	January 28-February 2, 2022	Washington, D.C.	NGA Winter meeting
20	March 31-April 7, 2022	Minneapolis, Washington, D.C.	Attended Women's NCAA Final Four in Minneapolis to see Aliyah Boston followed by official meetings in Washington, D.C.
21	April 12–19, 2022	Washington, D.C., Miami, Florida	Attended National Conference for Workforce Development in D.C. and spent Easter with family in Miami.
22	March 27-April 1, 2023	Taiwan	
23	May 2, 2023	Boston	Attended Boston Red Sox Game.
24	July 18, 2023	Las Vegas, Nevada	Attended Basketball event in Las Vegas, Nevada
25	September 12, 2023	New York	Attended New York Jets Game.
26	September 19, 2023 - October 2, 2023	Chicago, Illinois	Took government officials on trip to discuss marijuana and other matters.
27	November 20–26, 2023	Location and Reason for Expenditures Undisclosed to Public	
28	May 13, 2024	Hawaii	Attended Conference in Hawaii While the Virgin Islands faced an energy crisis.
29	July 15–21, 2024	Royal Caribbean Cruise	Attended the inaugural sail of Royal Caribbean's Utopia of the Seas at the invitation of Royal Caribbean Cruise Line.

== Personal life ==
The FBI arrested both of Bryan's parents on charges of stealing various expensive items after Hurricane Hugo devastated St. Croix.

Bryan and his ex-wife, Yolanda Cabodevilla, were married in 1998. They have since divorced. They have two daughters, Aliyah and Sumuyah. Bryan has been dating a Government of the Virgin Islands employee (who he appointed to her position) for several years, which has raised ethical concerns.

Bryan lives in Government House in Christiansted on St. Croix. In March 2019, the West Indian Company authorized monthly rent payments of $3,500 for a condo where Bryan would stay while on St. Thomas on behalf of his request.

Party political offices
Preceded by Donna Christensen	Democratic nominee for Governor of the United States Virgin Islands; 2018, 2022	Succeeded by Stacey Plaskett
Political offices
Preceded by Kenneth Mapp	Governor of the United States Virgin Islands; 2019–present	Incumbent
