= Callwood =

Callwood is a surname. Notable people with the surname include:

- Azarni Callwood (born 2006), British Virgin Islands footballer
- Brett Callwood (born 1975), English journalist, copy writer, editor, and author
- June Callwood (1924–2007), Canadian journalist, writer, and activist
- Kirk Callwood (born 1973), Former Commissioner of the Virgin Islands Department of Education
