= Samuel Baptiste =

Politician from the US Virgin Islands

Samuel Baptiste (born December 19, 1963, in Saint Croix) is a United States Virgin Islands politician and businessman. He was most recently a Democratic candidate for Lieutenant Governor of the United States Virgin Islands in 2010 as the running mate of Senator Adlah Donastorg Jr.

== Biography ==
=== Early life ===
Samuel Baptiste was born on Saint Croix, U.S. Virgin Islands, on December 19, 1963. His mother, Elaine Baptiste was from Willikies, Antigua, while his father, Lennard Baptiste, was originally from the town of Castle Bruce, Dominica. He was raised in Frederiksted, where he attended Claude O. Markoe Elementary School and Arthur Richards Junior High School. Baptiste graduated from high school in Florida.

Baptiste enlisted in the U.S. Army following his graduation from high school. He remained a member of the Army for thirteen years. He was based with the 82nd Airborne Division at Fort Bragg in North Carolina. Baptiste was honorably discharged in March 1997.

=== Education ===
Baptiste received a bachelor's degree in business administration from the University of the Virgin Islands in 2001. He later obtained two master's degrees in business administration and public administration from the University of the Virgin Islands in 2009.

=== Business career ===
Baptiste runs a H&R Block franchise, located in Villa La Reine on Saint Croix. He also owns the Virgin Islands Training Institute.

He was employed at Hovensa, an oil refinery in Saint Croix, for ten years before resigning in 2010 to run for Lieutenant Governor.

=== Political career ===
Baptiste served as an assistant commissioner of Property and Procurement under former U.S. Virgin Islands Governor Roy Schneider in August 1997. Baptiste also unsuccessfully ran for Governor of the U.S. Virgin Islands in 2002 as a Republican.

On July 25, 2010, Democratic gubernatorial candidate Senator Adlah Donastorg announced that Baptiste would be his running mate for Lieutenant Governor in the upcoming 2010 gubernatorial election. Donastorg and Baptiste were defeated in the 2010 Democratic primary election on September 11, 2010, by incumbent Governor John de Jongh. Donatorg and Baptiste came in second place in the primary, garnering 4,300 votes, or 30.61% of the total vote.
