= Donna Christensen =

American politician (born 1945)

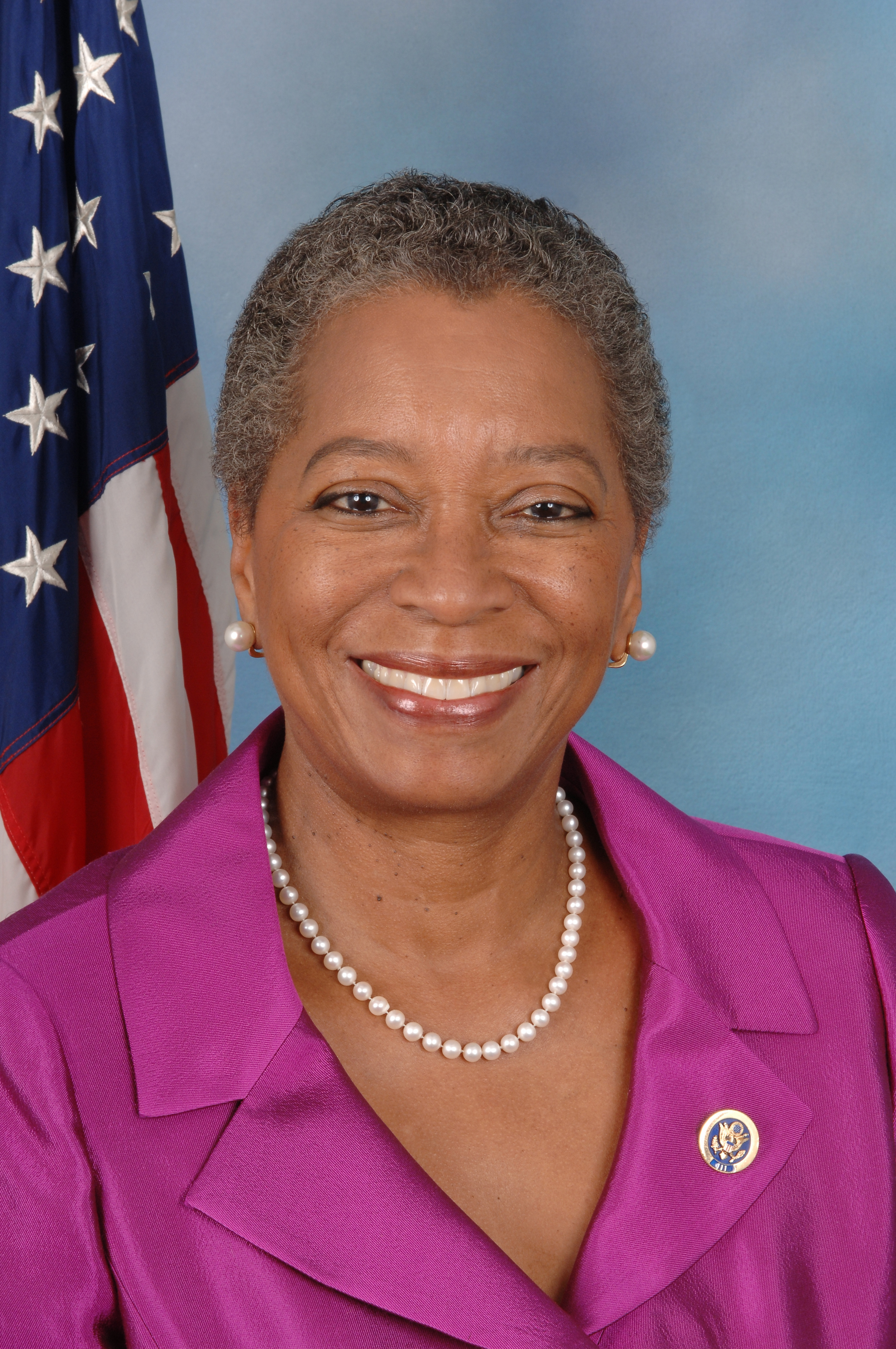

Chair of the Virgin Islands Democratic Party
- In office August 6, 2016 – August 4, 2018
- Preceded by: Cecil Benjamin
- Succeeded by: Cecil Benjamin

Delegate to the U.S. House of Representatives from the U.S. Virgin Islands's at-large district
- In office January 3, 1997 – January 3, 2015
- Preceded by: Victor O. Frazer
- Succeeded by: Stacey Plaskett

Personal details
- Born: Donna Marie Christian; September 19, 1945 (age 80) Teaneck, New Jersey, U.S.
- Party: Democratic
- Spouse: Chris Christensen (m. 1998)
- Education: St. Mary's College, Indiana (BS); George Washington University (MD)

Donna Marie Christian-Christensen, formerly Donna Christian-Green (born September 19, 1945), is an American physician and politician. She served as the 4th elected non-voting Delegate from the United States Virgin Islands's at-large district to the United States House of Representatives from 1997 until 2015. A member of the Democratic Party, Christensen is the first woman to win the party's nomination for governor in Virgin Islands history. She is the first woman to represent the territory in the U.S. Congress.

== Biography ==
=== Early life ===
Born Donna Christian in Teaneck, New Jersey, she is the daughter of a Virgin Islands Federal District Court judge, Almeric L. Christian. She received her Bachelor of Science from St. Mary's College in Notre Dame, Indiana in 1966. Christensen then attended the George Washington University School of Medicine in Washington, D.C., where she received an M.D. in 1970. She interned at San Francisco's Pacific Medical Center from 1970 to 1971 and performed her residency in family medicine at Howard University Medical Center from 1973 to 1974.

=== Career ===
Donna Christian-Christensen worked as a physician, first in the emergency room and later in the maternity ward. She then served as medical director for the St. Croix Hospital in St. Croix, Virgin Islands. She was the Acting Commissioner of Health for the Virgin Islands in 1993 and 1994 and also ran a private medical practice until 1996.

Christian was a delegate to the Democratic National Conventions from 1994 through 2012 elections. She has also previously served on the Status Commission and the Board of Education for the USVI.

She was also active in community organizations in the Virgin Islands, working to protect St. Croix from overdevelopment, and leading an effort to improve the quality of local judicial appointments.

== U.S. House of Representatives ==
Donna Christian-Christensen ran unsuccessfully for the position of USVI delegate in 1994, losing in the primary to former judge Eileen Petersen. She won a three-way race beating Victor Frazer, an Independent. That race also included future Governor Kenneth Mapp, who would defeat Christensen in 2014 during the Governor race. However, she was elected as a Democrat to the House in a 1996 runoff with Frazer and served from January 3, 1997, to January 3, 2015.

Christian-Christensen has supported Obama's Patient Protection and Affordable Care Act. Shortly before the Supreme Court affirmed the legislation, she said "For 99 years, presidents have been trying to do this. Finally, our president has made it possible for each and every American."

Donna Christian-Christensen is a member of the Congressional Black Caucus and the Congressional Progressive Caucus. She was featured on The Colbert Report's Better Know a Protectorate segment. She is also the first female physician to win a congressional election.

=== Elections ===
2008

During the 2008 electoral campaign, she appeared in a TV advertisement endorsing the reelection of neighboring Puerto Rico Governor Aníbal Acevedo Vilá, who went to trial after the November 2008 elections for a twenty-four-count federal Grand Jury indictment for corruption. The jury found him not guilty, though he did lose his bid for re-election.

2010

Christian-Christensen won her 2010 reelection campaign with 71.22% of the vote.

2012

Christian-Christensen received substantial donations, at least $37,000, for her re-election from sources that are connected to Jeffrey Thompson, the chartered health services chairman. However, since he had recently come under fire for a scandal, this money may have been considered to be "pecunia non grata" (unwanted money). Soon after, Thompson's firm was awarded a $6.3 million government contract in the Virgin Islands, Christensen's home district. Nonetheless, Christian-Christensen won her 2012 re-election bid with 60.05% of the vote.

2014

Christian-Christensen did not seek re-election to her congressional seat. Instead, she ran for Governor of the United States Virgin Islands, ultimately losing to Kenneth Mapp in a runoff.

=== Committee assignments ===
- Committee on Energy and Commerce
  - Subcommittee on Communications and Technology
  - Subcommittee on Oversight and Investigations

=== Caucus memberships ===
- Congressional Black Caucus
- Congressional Caucus on Women's Issues
- Congressional Progressive Caucus
- Congressional Travel and Tourism Caucus
- International Conservation Caucus
- Congressional Arts Caucus

== Honors and recognitions ==
On March 23, 2009, Delegate Christensen became the Ship Sponsor of the USCGC Reef Shark during the vessel's commissioning ceremony in San Juan, Puerto Rico. The Reef Shark is a new 87' cutter, built at an approximate cost of $7.5 million by Bollinger Shipyards in Lockport, Louisiana.

In July 2023, the Legislature of the Virgin Islands passed a bill honoring Christensen for her tireless work of public service and renamed the Charles Harwood Memorial Complex on St. Croix, in her honor.

== See also ==
- List of African-American United States representatives
- Physicians in the United States Congress
- Women in the United States House of Representatives

U.S. House of Representatives
Preceded by Victor Frazer	Delegate to the U.S. House of Representatives from the United States Virgin Islands's at-large congressional district 1997–2015	Succeeded by Stacey Plaskett
Party political offices
Preceded by John de Jongh	Democratic nominee for Governor of the United States Virgin Islands; 2014	Succeeded by Albert Bryan
Preceded by Cecil Benjamin	Chair of the Virgin Islands Democratic Party; 2016–2018	Succeeded by Cecil Benjamin
