= Tregenza Roach =

American politician

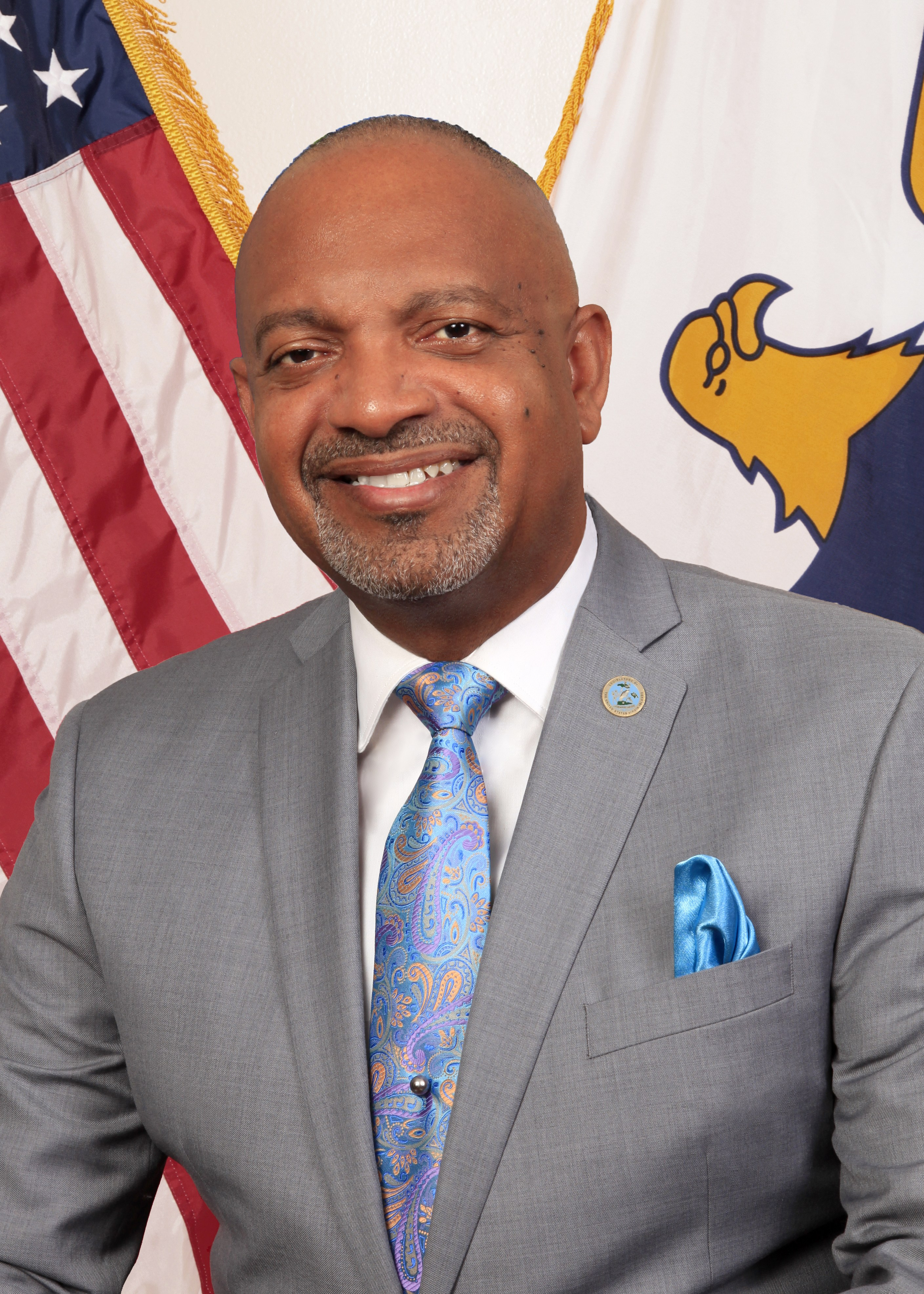
- Official portrait, 2016

12th Lieutenant Governor of the Virgin Islands
- Incumbent
- Assumed office January 7, 2019
- Governor: Albert Bryan
- Preceded by: Osbert Potter

Member of the Virgin Islands Legislature from St. Thomas/St. John district
- In office January 14, 2013 – December 28, 2018
- Succeeded by: Stedmann Hodge Jr.

Personal details
- Born: August 7, 1959 (age 66) Sandy Point Town, Saint Kitts and Nevis
- Party: Independent (before 2019); Democratic (2019–present)
- Education: University of the Virgin Islands (attended); University of Missouri (BA); University of Connecticut, Hartford (JD)

Tregenza A. Roach (born August 7, 1959) is an Kittian-American politician, attorney, and former journalist. Since 2019, Roach has been serving as the 12th lieutenant governor of the United States Virgin Islands. Roach previously was a member of the Legislature of the Virgin Islands for the St. Thomas/St. John district from 2013 to 2019.

== Early life and education ==
Tregenza Roach was born on the island of Saint Kitts, in Saint Kitts and Nevis, and moved to the United States Virgin Islands at the age of eight. His parents, Victor and Iona Roach, had moved to Saint Thomas years earlier. After attending St. Thomas Seventh-day Adventist School and Wayne Aspinall Jr. High School, Roach graduated from Charlotte Amalie High School in 1977.

Roach attended the College of the Virgin Islands (now known as the University of the Virgin Islands) as a Holstein–Lewis scholar. He earned a Bachelor of Journalism at the University of Missouri. Roach holds a Juris Doctor from the University of Connecticut School of Law.

== Career ==
Roach started his career as a reporter for the Virgin Islands Daily News, rising to news editor. Roach was a law clerk at various U.S. and V.I. governmental offices, practiced in the Territorial Court's Civil and Family divisions and was an associate attorney at Bornn Bornn Handy and Rashid. He has been a member of the Virgin Islands Bar since 1991.

=== Virgin Islands legislature ===
As a member of the Virgin Islands legislature, Roach championed legislation that would make attending the University of the Virgin Islands tuition-free for undergraduate students. The legislation was ultimately approved by the legislature in December 2018.

=== Lieutenant Governor of the United States Virgin Islands ===
In the 2018 Virgin Islands gubernatorial election, Roach was selected by Democratic nominee Albert Bryan as his running mate, and were elected in November 2018.

== Personal life ==
Roach is also an author and poet whose work has been included in several collections of contemporary Caribbean poetry. He was awarded the Margaret Walker Fiction Prize by the Detroit Writers Guild in 1999 and the St. Thomas & St. John Library Association's Distinguished Caribbean Author Award in 2009. On April 27, 2022, Roach tested positive for Covid-19 after being notified about a staff member in his office with a positive case.

Political offices
Preceded by Osbert Potter	Lieutenant Governor of the United States Virgin Islands; 2019–present	Incumbent
