= Barbara A. Petersen =

American politician

Barbara Petersen

Personal details
- Born: St. Thomas, Virgin Islands, U.S.
- Political party: Democratic
- Education: Elizabeth Seton College; City University of New York, John Jay (BA)

Barbara A. Petersen is a Saint Thomian who served as administrator for Saint Thomas and Water Island, United States Virgin Islands from 2007 to 2015.

== Career ==
From 1986 to about 1996, Petersen served as the regional director in the Midwestern United States for the Virgin Islands Tourism Department.

Petersen worked as a manager for customer service and direct sales and then marketing specialist manager at Cardow Jewelers. She also worked at Turbine Generator Maintenance Inc. as its regional sales coordinator, and she worked in marketing with two travel-related companies.

Petersen was also co-host of the A.M.V.I. radio program on WVWI Radio One.

On January 30, 2007, Governor John deJongh Jr. appointed Petersen, to serve as St. Thomas-Water Island Administrator. She succeeded James O'Bryan Jr.

In April 2017, Petersen was a Democratic candidate for the Legislature of the Virgin Islands. She came in fourth place.

Petersen also serves as vice chair of the Board of Trustees of the Virgin Islands Humanities Council and director of club administration of the Rotary Club of St. Thomas II.
