= Cecil Benjamin =

American political activist

Chair of the Virgin Islands Democratic Party
- In office August 4, 2018 – August 1, 2020
- Preceded by: Donna Christian-Christensen
- Succeeded by: Glen Smith
- In office April 2005 – August 6, 2016
- Preceded by: Jimmy O'Bryan
- Succeeded by: Donna Christian-Christensen

Personal details
- Born: 1947 or 1948 (age 78–79) Guyana
- Party: Democratic
- Education: Interamerican University of Puerto Rico (BS); University of Pennsylvania; Temple University (MEd)

Cecil R. Benjamin is an American political activist and executive, who served as the Chair of the Democratic Party of the Virgin Islands.

== Career ==
Benjamin was previously a teacher and served as the President of the St. Croix Federation of Teachers and the International and National Vice-president of the American Federation of Teachers.

Benjamin has also served as the commissioner of the Virgin Islands Department of Labor.

In 2016, Benjamin served as a super delegate from the U.S. Virgin Islands at the 2016 Democratic National Convention in Philadelphia, Pennsylvania. He supported Hillary Clinton in this position.

Benjamin served as the Chair of the Democratic Party of the Virgin Islands. Benjamin was the U.S. Virgin Island's representative and nominated Joe Biden for the party's nomination. In his video message, Benjamin stated “greetings from the Virgin Islands of the United States, where a young Alexander Hamilton was raised. Vacation home of our nominee, with turquoise waters, white sand beaches and friendly people, we cast our 13 votes for Joseph R. Biden, who will achieve full voting rights in Congress and our right to vote for president.”

Party political offices
Preceded by Jimmy O'Bryan	Chair of the Virgin Islands Democratic Party; 2005–2016	Succeeded by Donna Christian-Christensen
Preceded by Donna Christian-Christensen	Chair of the Virgin Islands Democratic Party; 2018–2020	Succeeded by Glen Smith
