= Kirk Callwood =

Former Commissioner of the Virgin Islands Department of Education

Associate Managing Director of USVI Economic Development Authority
- Incumbent
- Assumed office June 20, 2025

Commissioner of the Virgin Islands Department of Finance
- In office June 17, 2019 – October 2020
- Governor: Albert Bryan
- Deputy: Clarina Modeste-Elliot
- Preceded by: Clarina Modeste-Elliot (acting)
- Succeeded by: Clarina Modeste-Elliot (acting)

Personal details
- Born: Kirk Tracy Callwood Sr. November 15, 1973 (age 52) St. Thomas, U.S. Virgin Islands
- Spouse: Tracy Eloi
- Children: 2
- Education: Norfolk State University; Kennesaw State University (MBA)

Kirk Callwood (born November 15, 1973) was the Commissioner of the Virgin Islands Department of Finance from June 2019 to October 2020. He currently serves as the Associate Managing Director for the Virgin Islands Economic Development Authority.

Callwood was appointed Commissioner of Finance by Virgin Islands Governor Albert Bryan Jr., with the advice and consent of the Virgin Islands Senate. He resigned in October 2020, after he granted unauthorized stipends to some of his staff, out of his department's budget.
