= U.S. Virgin Islands Department of Human Services =

The U.S. Virgin Islands Department of Human Services is a department of the government of the U.S. Virgin Islands. It has its headquarters in the Knud Hansen Complex Building A in St. Thomas. It also has offices in Christiansted, St. Croix and St. John.

The department of Children, Youth, and Families operates juvenile justice services, including the Youth Rehabilitation Center (YRC). The division provides juvenile justice services for pre-trial and adjudicated youth.
