= Osbert Potter =

American politician

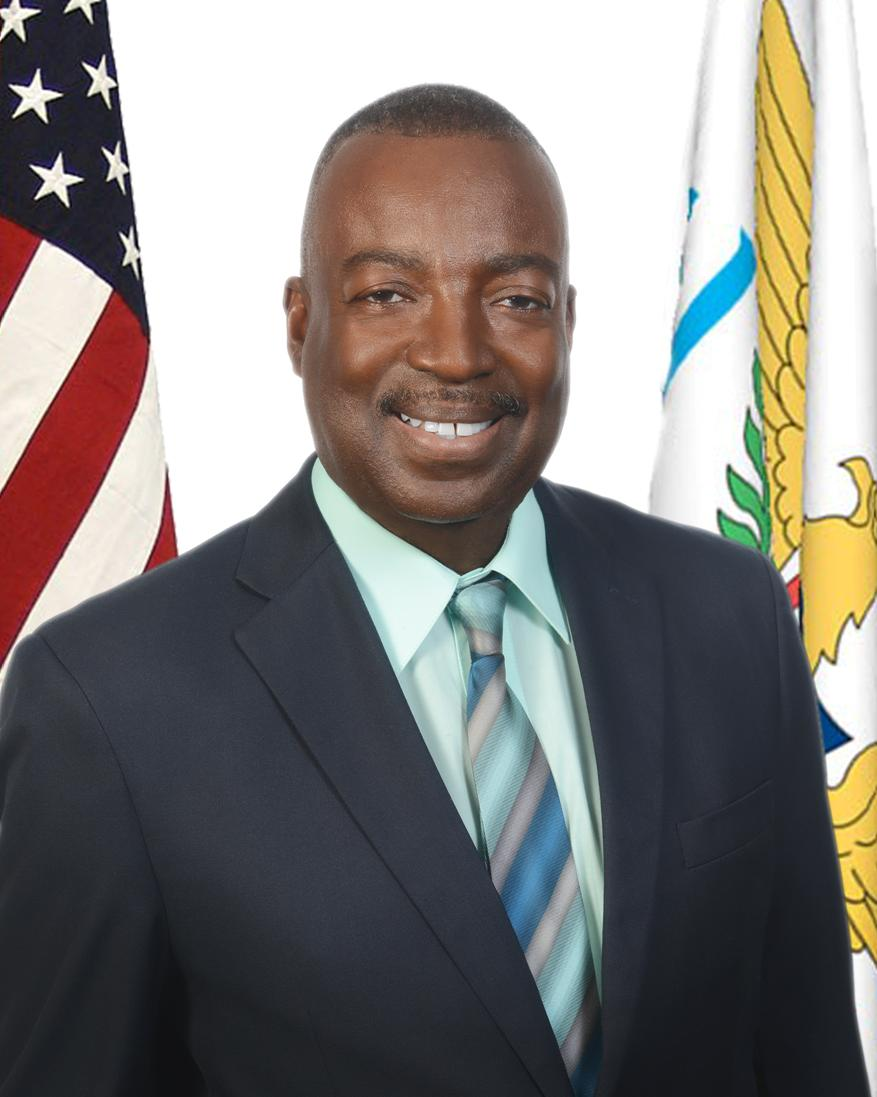

11th Lieutenant Governor of the United States Virgin Islands
- In office January 5, 2015 – January 7, 2019
- Governor: Kenneth Mapp
- Preceded by: Gregory Francis
- Succeeded by: Tregenza Roach

Member of the Virgin Islands Legislature from the St. Thomas-St. John district
- In office January 1993 – January 1996

Personal details
- Born: May 8, 1956 (age 69) Tortola, British Virgin Islands
- Party: Independent
- Children: 5
- Relatives: Milton E. Potter (brother)
- Education: University of the Virgin Islands (BA)

Osbert E. Potter (born May 8, 1956 in Tortola, British Virgin Islands) is an American politician who served as the 11th lieutenant governor of the United States Virgin Islands from 2015 to 2019.

== Biography ==
Osbert Potter was the third of eight children born to Margaret and Cecil Potter on the island of Tortola, British Virgin Islands. At the age of 10, he moved to the island of Saint Thomas, U.S. Virgin Islands. He would later attend the Charlotte Amalie High School, graduating in 1974. He would continue his education at the University of the Virgin Islands, graduating cum laude in 1978 with a Bachelor of Arts in Business Administration, concentrating in Finance.

He was a part-time instructor at the University of the Virgin Islands from 1978–1992. He later successfully campaigned for a seat in the Legislature of the Virgin Islands, being elected to the 20th and 21st Legislature in 1992 and 1994 respectively. During his tenure, he served as Chairman of the Committee of Economic Development, Agriculture and Consumer Protection. Potter joined the Virgin Islands National Guard in 1985 and served for 23 years. In 2004, he was hired to head WTJX-TV, the only PBS affiliate in the territory.

Political offices
Preceded by Gregory Francis	Lieutenant Governor of the United States Virgin Islands; 2015–2019	Succeeded by Tregenza Roach
