= Gerard Luz James =

8th Lieutenant Governor of the United States Virgin Islands

Gerard Luz Amwur James II
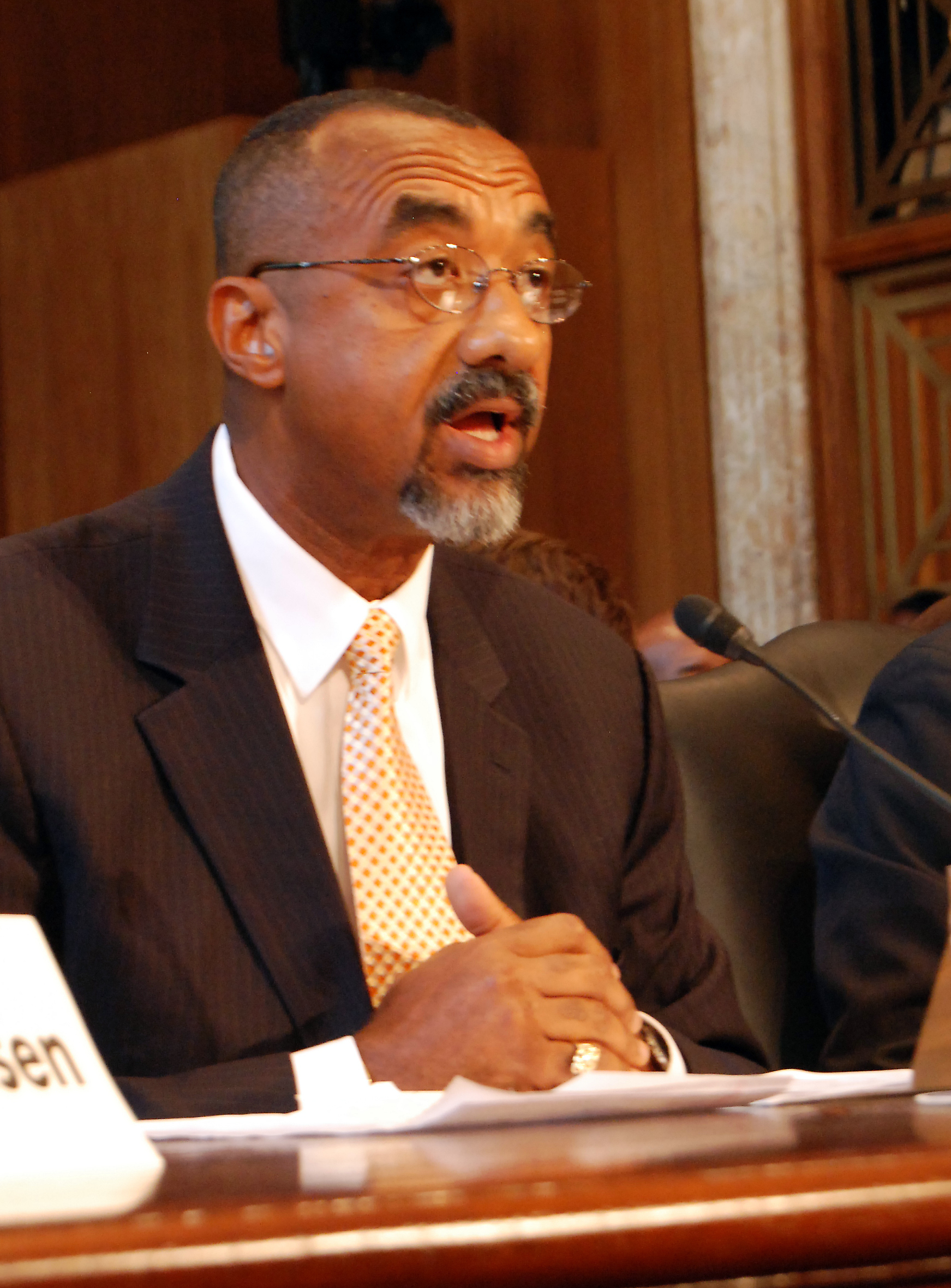

8th Lieutenant Governor of the United States Virgin Islands
- In office January 4, 1999 – January 6, 2003
- Governor: Charles Turnbull
- Preceded by: Kenneth Mapp
- Succeeded by: Vargrave Richards

Personal details
- Born: March 18, 1953 (age 73) Saint Croix, United States Virgin Islands
- Party: Democratic
- Education: Howard University

Military service
- Allegiance: United States of America
- Branch/service: United States Army
- Rank: Captain

Gerard Luz Amwur James II (born March 18, 1953) is an American politician, funeral director, and businessman. James served as the eighth lieutenant governor of the United States Virgin Islands from 1999 until 2003 and was the president of Fifth Constitutional Convention of the U.S. Virgin Islands.

== Biography ==
=== Early life ===
James was born in Saint Croix on March 18, 1953, to parents G. Luz A. James and Asta Maria Klyvert-James. He was the family's first son and second child. He attended St. Mary's Catholic school and the Christiansted Junior High in St. Croix Virgin Islands, before enrolling at the now defunct St. Emma's Military Academy in Powhatan, Virginia. In January 1970, he was transferred to Miami Military Academy where he graduated in 1971.Miami Military Academy in Florida.

=== Career ===
James received a bachelor's degree in political science from Howard University in 1975. He enlisted in the U.S. Army, where he served for six years. He was promoted to the rank of captain before being honorably discharged in 1981.

He studied mortuary science at American Academy McAllister Institute of Funeral Service and in November 1983, became a License Funeral Director of the State of New York, before returning to the United States Virgin Islands. James opened his funeral home, the James Memorial Funeral Home. In February 1984, Christiansted, which he still owns and operate as of 2021 .

=== Political career ===
Gerard Luz Amwur James II began his political career in 1992 when he was elected a Senator in the 20th Virgin Islands Legislature. During his first term as a member of the majority, he chaired the Committee of Rules which is second in power to the Committee of Finance in the Legislature. He also debated vigorously under extreme pressure in favor of the Virgin Island Government purchase of the West Indian Company Dock which since has been a vital part of the Virgin Islands economy. In 1994, James was re-elected to the 21st Legislature however this time he was a minority member. During the 21st Legislature Senator James brought legislation that aided AT&T to bring Fiber Optic to the islands of St. Croix, which expanded the world of telecommunications in the Virgin Islands. The election of 1996, Senator James was unsuccessful in regaining his seat in the senate, thus he returned to his profession at the funeral home.

In 1998, Charles Turnbull, a candidate for Governor of the U.S. Virgin Islands, chose James as his running mate for lieutenant governor. The Turnull-James ticket was elected in the 1998 gubernatorial election. James was sworn in as Lieutenant Governor on Monday, January 4, 1999.

Turnbull and James had high profile, public disagreements during their tenure in office. The dispute led James to challenge Turnbull in the 2002 gubernatorial election. However, Turnbull defeated James and other challengers in the election. The Governor replaced named Vargrave Richards as his new Lieutenant Governor.

James was the president of the Fifth Constitutional Convention of the U.S. Virgin Islands.

=== 2010 gubernatorial candidacy ===
Gerard Luz James announced his candidacy for Governor of the U.S. Virgin Islands as a Democrat. His campaign was officially launched on was made on August 1, 2010, in Buddhoe Park in Frederiksted. James chose Glen J. Smith, an educator, as his running mate.

James and Smith faced three opponents and two other candidates in the Democratic primary election on September 11, 2010 – incumbent Governor John de Jongh, Senator Adlah Donastorg and James O'Bryan Jr. In the primary election, James came in third place behind the primary's winner, De Jongh, and Donastorg, who came in second place. Following the primary, James stated that he "accepted the people's decision," but further elaborated, "The people of the Virgin Islands showed me today that they really and truly endure mistreatment, endure corruption, endure mismanagement, and they also endure maltreatment to each other...The only thing that I can see is continued destruction, and it's sad, sad, sad." James stated that he would not endorse Governor John de Jongh for a second term in the 2010 general election saying, "Why should I endorse anyone when it shows me truly that the people don't want to have anything that is right?"

Political offices
| Preceded by Kenneth Mapp | Lieutenant Governor of the United States Virgin Islands; 1999–2003 | Succeeded by Vargrave Richards |
