= Revised Organic Act of the Virgin Islands =

United States federal law

The Revised Organic Act of the Virgin Islands is a United States federal law that repealed and replaced the previous Organic Act of the Virgin Islands. It was passed on July 22, 1954, by the U.S. Congress to act as the basis for law in the United States Virgin Islands. Like other organic acts it functions as a constitution for a territory of the United States.

== Provisions ==
The Revised Organic Act provides for:

- A unicameral (single-body) legislature of 11 (later 15) members, elected by the residents of the U.S. Virgin Islands. While this legislature largely creates the laws that govern the islands, the ultimate laws that govern are still those of the U.S. Congress, a body in which Virgin Islanders have no vote;
- A court system with judges appointed by the governor and confirmed by the Legislature;
- A Bill of Rights.
