= Adlah Donastorg Jr. =

American politician (born 1961)

Foncie Donastorg

Member of the Legislature of the Virgin Islands
- In office January 1995 – January 2011

Personal details
- Born: Adlah Alphonso Donastorg Jr. December 30, 1961 (age 64) St. Thomas, Virgin Islands, U.S.
- Party: Democratic (before 2026); Independent (2026–present)
- Education: Mt. San Antonio College (attended); Fullerton College (attended); University of the Virgin Islands (attended); Madison University (attended); University of Phoenix (BS); Villanova University (MPA)

Adlah Alphonso "Foncie" Donastorg Jr. (born December 30, 1961) is a American politician, who served as a Senator in the Legislature of the Virgin Islands for seven terms from January 1995 through January 2011. He was most recently a Democratic candidate for Governor of the United States Virgin Islands in the 2010 and the 2014 gubernatorial elections.

== Biography ==
=== Personal life ===
Donastorg was born on December 30, 1961, in Saint Thomas, U.S. Virgin Islands to Josefina and Adlah Donastorg, Sr. He is the father of six children - Sean, Adlah, Vanessa, Erika, Adonte, and Amiel - and is married to Benedicta "Bennie" Acosta-Donastorg. He began his undergraduate studies in business administration at Mt. San Antonio College and then Fullerton College from 1982 to 1983, before transferring to the University of the Virgin Islands (with a management focus) for several years. and eventually earning his bachelor of science in business management from the University of Phoenix by correspondence from 2006 to 2009. He received his MPA from Villanova University in 2017.

In 2006 the Virgin Islands Daily News reported that Donastorg listed on his resume a bachelor's degree in business administration from Madison University in 2005. Investigation by the newspaper revealed that Madison was not accredited by any recognized agency and was listed on the "Non-Approved Entities" list of the Mississippi Commission on College Accreditation. Madison provided names of several "accreditors" that the newspaper found are either not engaged in accreditation or are not recognized accreditors in the United States, including the World Association of Universities and Colleges, National Academy of Higher Education, and the Association of Distance Learning Programs. After publication of this information, Donastorg's attorney notified the newspaper that he would sue over the article. Donastorg told the newspaper that his online classes through Madison University "were among some of the most challenging of his academic career" and he was not aware that Madison's accreditation was unrecognized.

=== Political career ===
Donastorg was first elected to the U.S. Virgin Islands Legislature in 1994. He took office as a Senator in January 1995 at the beginning of the 21st Legislature and served as Senator for seven terms through January 2011.

Donastorg was previously a candidate for Governor of the U.S. Virgin Islands in 2006 as an independent. His running mate for Lieutenant Governor was Dr. Cora Christian. However, Donastorg was defeated in the general election by John de Jongh, who won the 2006 gubernatorial election.

On July 25, 2010, Adlah Donastorg announced his candidacy for Governor of the U.S. Virgin Islands in the upcoming 2010 gubernatorial election. He announced his intention to challenge incumbent Governor John de Jongh in the Democratic primary on September 11, 2010. Donastorg, in his candidacy speech at the Estate La Grande Princesse, chose his running mate, Samuel Baptiste.

Donastorg pledged to focus on crime reduction. He challenged Governor de Jongh to three debates.

In the 2010 Democratic gubernatorial primary election, Donastorg was defeated by incumbent Governor John de Jongh. Governor de Jongh received 7,487 votes, or 53% of the vote, while Donastorg and Baptiste came in second place with 4,300 votes in the primary.

Donastorg is running for governor of the United States Virgin Islands in 2026 as an independent.

=== 2010 trial ===
Donastorg was arrested on March 5, 2010, in Saint Croix, in connection with a January 2010 alleged assault. He turned himself in at the request of investigators.

Donastorg was charged with four counts of domestic violence, including two felony charges. The charges were third-degree assault, using a dangerous weapon, aggravated assault and brandishing a deadly weapon. His accuser accused Donastorg of assault and threatening her with a gun. However, the woman recanted her claims against Donastorg on March 9, four days after his arrest.

Donastorg's lawyer accused the prosecution of political motivation, since the charges were filed during a gubernatorial election year. The judge in the case agreed to allow expert testimony in the trial, which began on September 20, 2010.

On September 23, 2010, a twelve-member jury found Donastorg not guilty and acquitted him of all charges.
