= John de Jongh Jr. =

American politician

John de Jongh
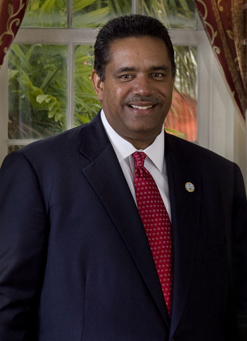

7th Governor of the United States Virgin Islands
- In office January 1, 2007 – January 5, 2015
- Lieutenant: Gregory Francis
- Preceded by: Charles Turnbull
- Succeeded by: Kenneth Mapp

Personal details
- Born: John Percy de Jongh Jr. November 13, 1957 (age 68) St. Thomas, Virgin Islands, U.S.
- Party: Democratic
- Spouse: Cecile Galiber
- Children: 3
- Education: Antioch College (BA)

John Percy de Jongh Jr. (born November 13, 1957) is an American businessman and politician. A member of the Democratic Party, he served as the seventh governor of the United States Virgin Islands from 2007 to 2015. He has been active in the Virgin Islands' politics and business community since after he graduated from college in 1981. De Jongh has been involved in community development, commercial banking, and served on the boards of business and philanthropic organizations.

De Jongh ran for governor in the 2002 general election as an independent candidate, placing second with 24.4% of the vote and losing to the incumbent, Charles W. Turnbull. In the 2006 general election de Jongh ran as the Democratic candidate and defeated former Lieutenant Governor Kenneth Mapp in a runoff and became governor. In 2010, he was re-elected to a second term and served until January 5, 2015, when he was term limited.

== Early life and education ==
De Jongh was born and raised on the island of St. Thomas in the U.S. Virgin Islands. As a child, he attended Sts. Peter and Paul School on St. Thomas. After his parents' divorce, he lived with his mother, Dolores, and two brothers, Stanley and Sydney, in Detroit, Michigan, where his mother was a social worker for the Detroit Public Schools. During the summer, de Jongh would return to St. Thomas to assist in his father's law firm. De Jongh graduated from Detroit Catholic Central High School in 1976. After his graduation, he attended Antioch College in Yellow Springs, Ohio. During his college career, he held work-study jobs in Detroit, Houston, Philadelphia and St. Thomas and completed an urban study program that involved travel to the United Kingdom, Yugoslavia and The Netherlands. He earned an economics degree from Antioch College. De Jongh graduated with a Bachelor of Arts degree from Antioch in 1981.

== Business career ==
After graduating from college, de Jongh returned to the Virgin Islands. He worked for several years with the Tri-Island Economic Development Council, during which he helped receive funding for the preservation of historic Virgin Island buildings, before taking a job with Chase Manhattan Bank. De Jongh first worked as an executive in the company's Puerto Rico office before returning to the Virgin Islands after earning the position of Consumer Manager of Operations in the U.S., British Virgin Islands and Saint Maarten. Under his leadership, Chase placed more emphasis on personal over corporate banking in the Caribbean and increased home mortgage lending.

In 1987, de Jongh was appointed as Commissioner of Finance by Governor Alexander A. Farrelly, his first government position and one that had once been held by his grandfather, Percy de Jongh. In addition to his primary responsibilities for financial administration, de Jongh served as Chairman of the Governing Board of the Virgin Islands Water and Power Authority and as an Executive Director and board member of the Virgin Islands Public Finance Authority. He was key in financial reforming and boosting the economy of the territory in the early 1990s. He also worked as an executive assistant to the governor's office, and he helped to coordinate better inter-agency cooperation. In 1992, he left government and returned to the private sector. That same year, de Jongh joined the real estate and insurance holding company, Lockhart Companies Incorporated where he served as President, CEO and a member of the board of directors until 2002. In 1993, he joined Public Financial Management, Inc., as a Senior Managing Consultant, where he helped to draft and implement Five-Year Plans for the cities of Philadelphia, Pennsylvania, New Haven, Connecticut, and Washington, D.C. From 1999 to 2001, de Jongh served as president of the St. Thomas-St. John Chamber of Commerce and headed a task force that created the Five Year Operating and Strategic Financial Plan for the government of the U.S Virgin Islands, co-chaired a private-public sector group to negotiate with cruise lines and was selected as Rotary II's Person of the Year.

In 2002, de Jongh left Lockhart Companies and unsuccessfully ran for governor as an independent candidate on a platform that addressed education, economic opportunity, crime, healthcare and financial management. De Jongh founded Chilmark Partners, a financial advisory firm focused on engagements in the Eastern Caribbean in 2003.

== Political career ==
In 2005, it was reported that de Jongh led all potential candidates to become the next governor of the U.S. Virgin Islands when the incumbent vacated his seat the following year. In 2006, he ran as a Democrat and won the Democratic Party primary defeating Lieutenant Governor Vargrave Richards and Senator Adlah Donastorg with 52.2% of the votes. He won the governorship in 2006 after defeating former Lieutenant Governor Mapp in a November 21 run-off election with over 57% of the vote.

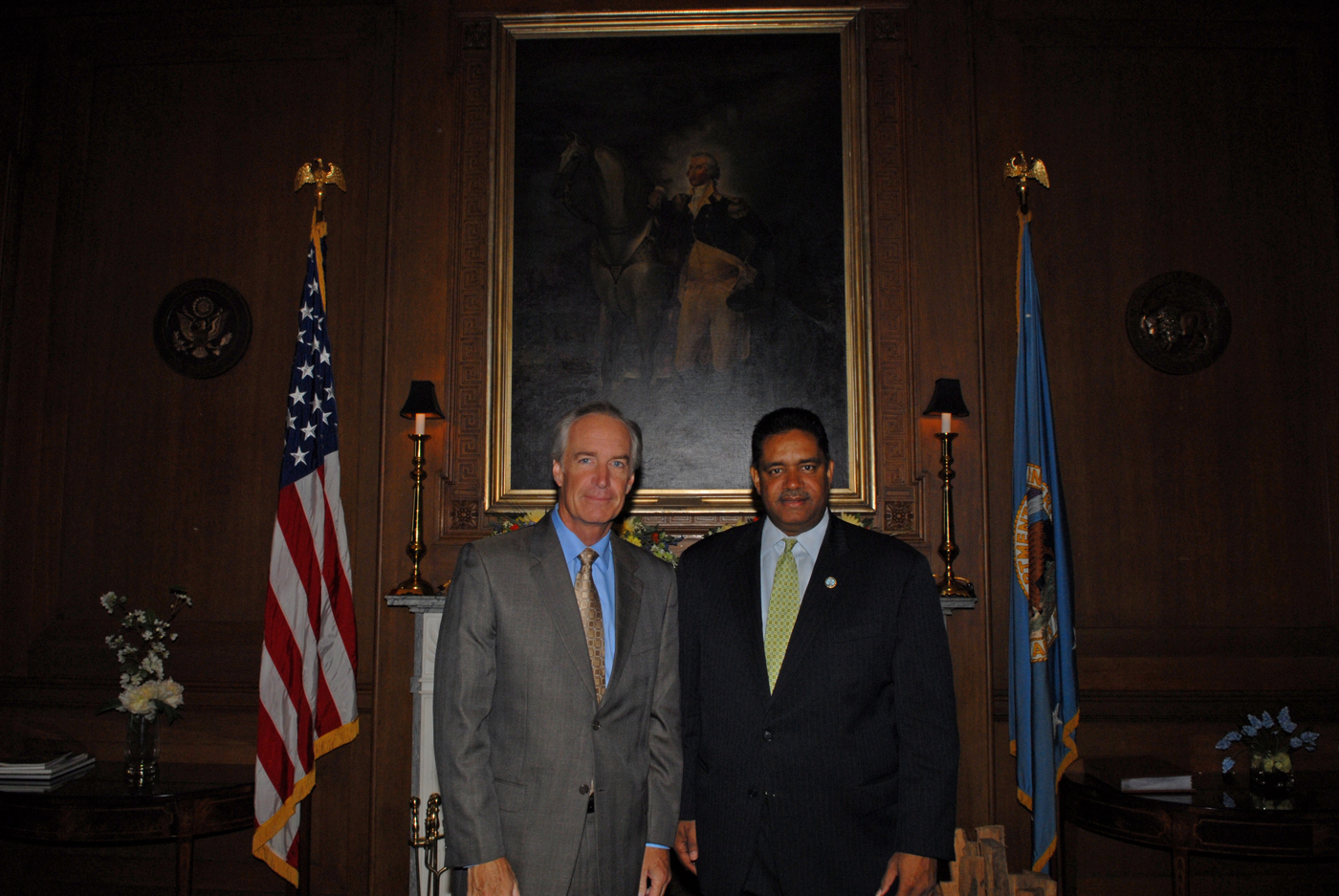
John de Jongh with Dirk Kempthorne, then-United States Secretary of the Interior, in 2008

De Jongh was sworn in as the 7th elected Governor of the Virgin Islands on January 1, 2007. His administration focused on addressing early childhood education issues, established the Children and Families Council, sought partnerships with cruise lines, airlines and rum companies, championed economic diversification and implemented revitalization projects for the islands that comprise the Virgin Islands. De Jongh also created programs to reduce the territory's dependence on fossil fuels. After announcing they would seek a second term in office, de Jongh and Lt. Governor Gregory Francis won the Democratic primary election on September 11, 2010, after receiving 53% of the vote in the primary, more than all three of their Democratic challengers combined.

De Jongh faced independent candidate Mapp, a former Lt. Governor, in the general election on November 2, 2010. The contest between de Jongh and Mapp was essentially a rematch of the top two contenders from the 2006 gubernatorial election. On November 2, 2010, De Jongh and Lt. Governor Gregory Francis were re-elected to second term, taking 17,535 votes, or 56.27%. De Jongh defeated the independent gubernatorial ticket of Mapp and Malik Sekou, who came in second with 13,580 votes. After reaching his term limit, de Jongh left office on January 5, 2015.

During his second term, his administration focused on the completion of the "middle mile" fiber optic network, implemented Medicaid expansion as part of the Affordable Care Act, and oversaw the impact of the closure of Hovensa, LLC and its oil refinery on the island of St. Croix.

== Post-gubernatorial career ==
In August 2015, de Jongh and Julito Francis, former director of finance of the Virgin Islands Public Finance Authority, were charged and arrested with embezzlement and neglecting to pay public monies relating to the alleged conversion of U.S. Virgin Islands public to fund security improvements to the former governor's private residence. In January 2016, V.I. Superior Court Senior Sitting Judge Darryl Donohue dismissed the charges against de Jongh.

In December 2016, de Jongh was appointed to the board of directors at Altisource Asset Management Corporation. De Jongh also serves as Principal of Chilmark Investment Partners, LLC. In October 2021, de Jongh was appointed to the UVI Board of Trustees.

== Personal life ==
De Jongh has been married to Cecile René Galiber since 1986. The couple have three children.

== Relationship with Jeffrey Epstein ==
His wife drew controversy after it was revealed that she sat on the board of the Jeffrey Epstein VI Foundation, a private foundation run by convicted sex-offender Jeffrey Epstein. A court filing by JPMorgan Chase in 2023 alleged that de Jongh's wife made efforts to secure student visas and a work license for young women trafficked by Epstein and that Epstein paid for de Jongh's children's school tuition.

In January 2026, newly released Epstein files showed extensive contact between De Jongh and Epstein. The files reveal that from 2008 to 2009 Epstein did pay for the tuition of de Jongh's children, sending checks to American University, Elon University, Skidmore College and Wake Forest University, totaling $70,066. In Epstein’s correspondence with de Jongh, Epstein called it "a treat" and said "Its as if i had my own kids in college."

Party political offices
Preceded by Charles Turnbull	Democratic nominee for Governor of the United States Virgin Islands; 2006, 2010	Succeeded by Donna Christian-Christensen
Political offices
Preceded by Charles Turnbull	Governor of the United States Virgin Islands; 2007–2015	Succeeded by Kenneth Mapp
