= Charlotte Amalie High School =

Public school in St. Thomas, U.S. Virgin Islands

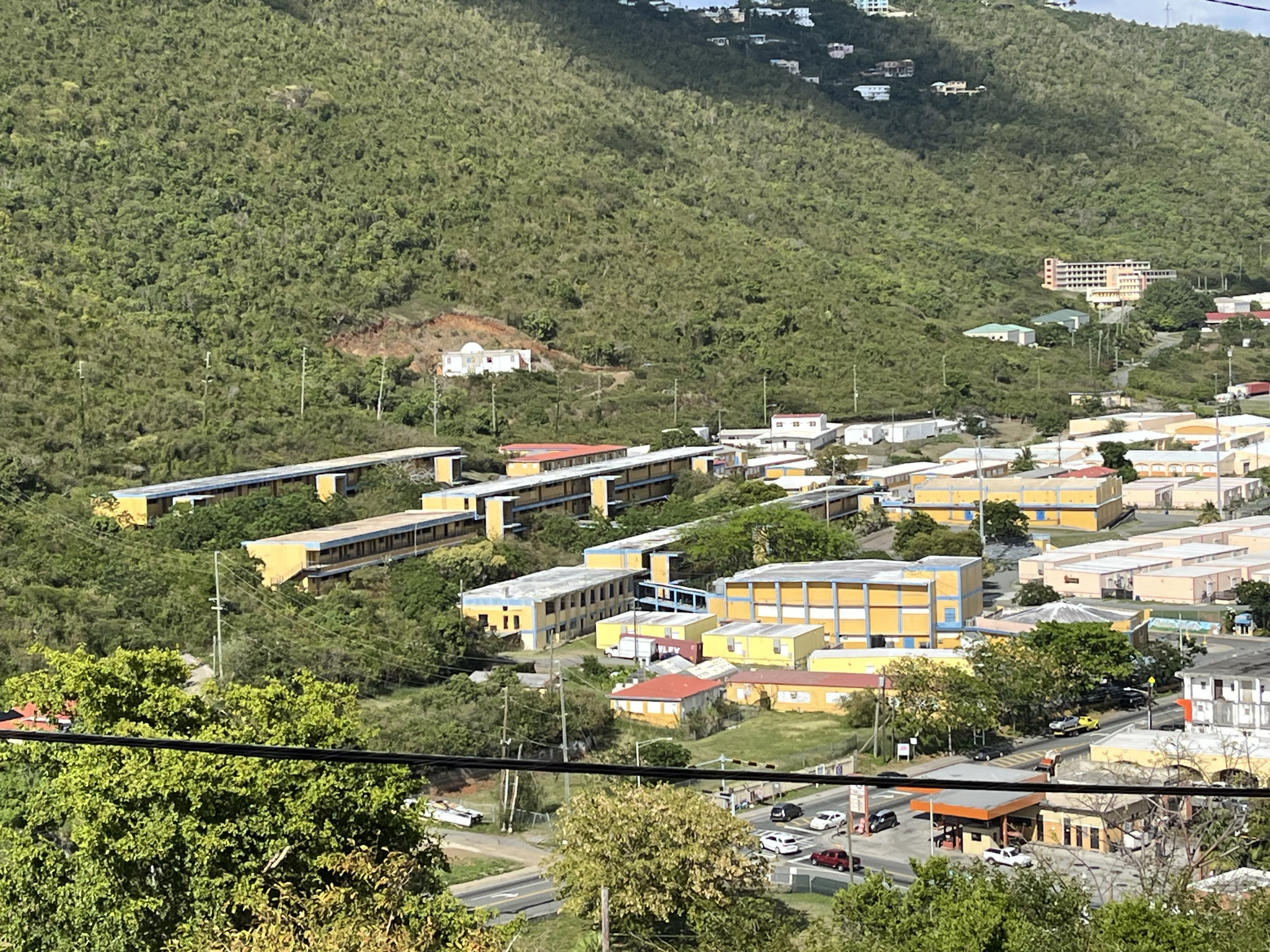

Location
- 8 and 9 Sugar Estate Road; Charlotte Amalie, St. Thomas 00802; U.S. Virgin Islands; 18°20′30″N 64°55′11″W

Information
- Type: Public
- Motto: "To Excel Always"
- Established: 1920 (106 years ago)
- CEEB code: 550080
- NCES School ID: 780003000005
- Principal: Njnanya Boyd
- Teaching staff: 88.00 ((on an FTE basis)
- Grades: 9–12
- Enrollment: 1076 (2023–24)
- Student to teacher ratio: 12.23
- Colors: Blue and gold
- Mascot: Chicken Hawk
- Accreditation: Middle States Association of Colleges and Schools (2019)
- Website: cam.vide.vi

Charlotte Amalie High School (CAHS) is a public high school housing a population of approximately 1,100 students. It is located in what is colloquially called the "town area" of the island of St. Thomas, United States Virgin Islands. It is named after the official name for the "town area," Charlotte Amalie. It is a part of the St. Thomas-St. John School District, and is the larger of the district's two high schools.

== History ==
CAHS was established in 1920 as a junior high school. In 1930, the first 12th grade class was added, and four students graduated in the class of 1931. It is popularly known as "High School" to older residents of St. Thomas, because it was the first public high school opened on the island. It was named after Charlotte Amalie of Hesse-Kassel (or Hesse-Cassel), the queen consort of Denmark and Norway, (the wife of King Christian V). The school had two other locations prior to where it currently stands. The first location was at the Commandant Gade Site, and the second was at what is now the Senate (Earl B. Ottley Legislative) Building. The Charlotte Amalie High School moved to its current location in 1955.

== Extracurricular activities ==
The athletes of CAHS have claimed multiple IAA (Interscholastic Athletic Association) titles in baseball, basketball, flag football, tackle football, soccer, softball, track & field, and volleyball.

CAHS always fields a strong team for the annual Virgin Islands Appellate High School Moot Court Competition held in the territory. After taking first place in 2013, 2014, and 2015, Charlotte Amalie High School also became the first to claim three consecutive victories in the competition. CAHS also claimed first-place finishes in the competition in 2011 and 2009.

The school also has excellent showings in the territorial JROTC Caribbean Drill Competitions, Poetry Out Loud, various Quiz Bowls, and the ever expanding Rock City Classic: Battle of the Bands (current and four-time repeat champions). The 2008 National Champion of the Poetry Out Loud competition was from the Charlotte Amalie High School.

== Notable alumni ==
- Jabari Blash, professional baseball player
- Elrod Hendricks, baseball player
- John "Dah Rock" Jackson, boxer
- Julius "The Chef" Jackson, boxer
- Bernard Law, Cardinal of the Roman Catholic Church
- Al McBean, baseball player
- Akeel Morris (born 1992), MLB pitcher in the San Francisco Giants organization
- Pressure, reggae musician
- LaVerne E. Ragster (born 1951), marine biologist and academic administrator
- Reuben Rogers, jazz bassist
- Tregenza Roach (born 1959), Lieutenant Governor of the Virgin Islands
- Rashawn Ross, trumpeter and arranger
- Terence Todman, the first African American to reach the rank of Career Ambassador in the United States Foreign Service
- Renaldo Turnbull, football player
