= Lieutenant Governor of the United States Virgin Islands =

Virgin Islander governmental office

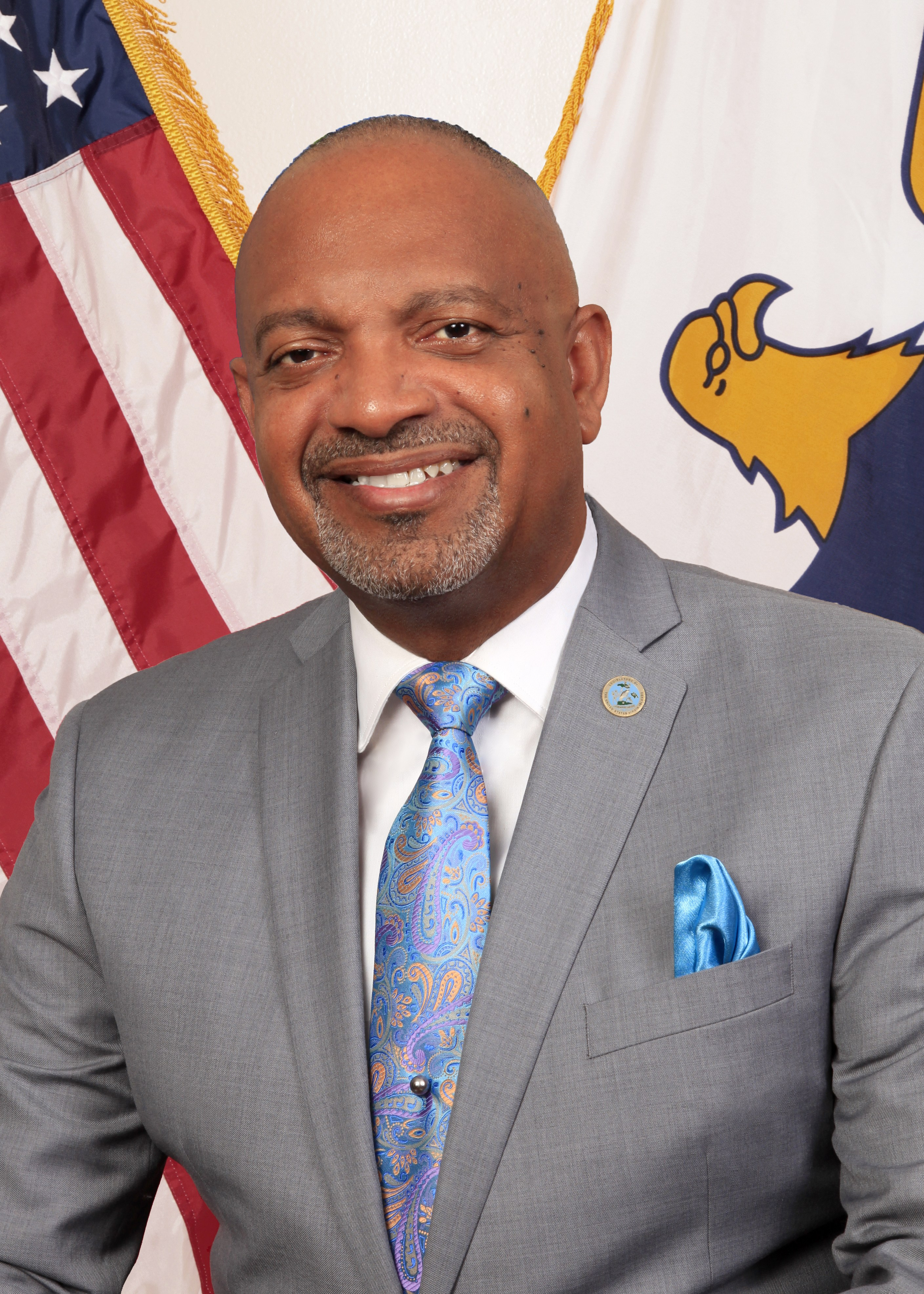
- Incumbent; Tregenza Roach since January 7, 2019
- Type: Lieutenant Governor
- Formation: July 1, 1969
- First holder: David Earle Maas
- Website: https://ltg.gov.vi/

The following is a list of lieutenant governors of the United States Virgin Islands.

== Lieutenant governors (1969–present) ==
Parties

Republican (3) Independent Citizens Movement (1) Democratic (7) Independent (1)

No.	Image	Lieutenant Governor (Birth–Death)	Took office	Left office	Party
1		David Earle Maas (1914–2005)	July 1, 1969	February 20, 1973	Republican
2		Athniel C. Ottley (1941–2022)	April 5, 1973	January 6, 1975	Republican
3		Juan Francisco Luis (1940–2011)	January 6, 1975	January 2, 1978	Independent Citizens Movement
4		Henry A. Millin (1923–2004)	April 10, 1978	January 1983	Democrat
5		Julio Brady (1942–2015)	January 1983	January 5, 1987	Democrat
6		Derek M. Hodge (1941–2011)	January 5, 1987	January 2, 1995	Democrat
7		Kenneth Mapp (born 1955)	January 2, 1995	January 4, 1999	Republican
8		Gerard Luz James II (born 1953)	January 4, 1999	January 6, 2003	Democrat
9		Vargrave Richards (born 1950)	January 6, 2003	January 1, 2007	Democrat
10		Gregory R. Francis (born 1951)	January 1, 2007	January 5, 2015	Democrat
11		Osbert Potter (born 1956)	January 5, 2015	January 7, 2019	Independent
12		Tregenza Roach (born 1959)	January 7, 2019	Incumbent	Democrat
13		Milton Potter (born 1963)	Lieutenant Governor-elect takes office January 4, 2027		Democrat
