= 1986 United States Virgin Islands general election =

1982 United States Virgin Islands gubernatorial election
- 4 November 1986 (general); 18 November 1986 (runoff)
Nominee	Alexander A. Farrelly	Adelbert M. Bryan
Party	Democratic	Independent Citizens Movement
Running mate	Derek M. Hodge	Gilbert A. Sprauve
Popular vote	16,825	8,809
Percentage	65.64%	34.36%
Governor before election
Juan Francisco Luis
Independent
Elected Governor
Alexander A. Farrelly
Democratic Party

General elections were held in the United States Virgin Islands on 4 November 1986, to elect a new governor and lieutenant governor, 15 members of the Legislature of the Virgin Islands and the Delegate to United States House of Representatives.

== Gubernatorial ==
Candidate	Running mate	Party	First round		Second round	
Candidate	Running mate	Party	Votes	%	Votes	%
Alexander A. Farrelly	Derek M. Hodge	Democratic Party	12,106	47.27	16,825	65.64
Adelbert M. Bryan	Gilbert A. Sprauve	Independent Citizens Movement	7,761	30.30	8,809	34.36
Roy L. Schneider	Roderick E. Moorehead	Independent	3,509	13.70		
Julio Brady	Lilliana Belardo de O'Neal	Independent	2,204	8.61		
William S. Crow	Earnest S. Daniels	Independent	32	0.12		
Total			25,612	100.00	25,634	100.00
Valid votes			25,612	97.10	25,634	99.12
Invalid/blank votes			765	2.90	227	0.88
Total votes			26,377	100.00	25,861	100.00
Registered voters/turnout			34,183	77.16	34,183	75.65

== Territorial Legislature ==
Senator At Large
Candidate	Party	Votes	%
Robert O'Connor Jr.	Independent	7,296	34.00
Cleone Creque Maynard	Democratic Party	5,910	27.54
Henry E. Thomas Sr.	Independent Citizens Movement	3,960	18.45
William Belardo	Independent	2,097	9.77
Llewellyn Sewer	Republican Party	1,668	7.77
Alvin L. Newton	Independent	530	2.47
Total		21,461	100.00

St. Thomas/St. John
Candidate	Party	Votes	%
Virdin C. Brown	Independent Citizens Movement	8,218	10.46
Bingley G. Richardson Sr.	Democratic Party	7,877	10.02
Clement Magras	Independent	7,409	9.43
Allan Paul Shatkin	Democratic Party	7,312	9.30
Iver A. Stridiron	Democratic Party	7,195	9.16
Lorraine Berry	Independent	6,975	8.88
David A. Puritz	Democratic Party	6,215	7.91
James O'Bryan Jr.	Independent	6,203	7.89
Gaylord A. Sprauve	Democratic Party	5,928	7.54
Stedmann Hodge	Independent	3,856	4.91
Kenneth Hobson	Independent	2,731	3.48
Halvor Hart Jr.	Independent	2,618	3.33
O'Neal Moolenaar	Independent	2,090	2.66
Samuel B. King	Independent	1,781	2.27
Charles Green	Independent	878	1.12
Charles C. Hull	Independent	732	0.93
Vernon C. Walwyn	Independent	569	0.72
Total		78,587	100.00

St. Croix
Candidate	Party	Votes	%
John A. Bell	Democratic Party	6,151	10.04
Ruby M. Rouss	Democratic Party	5,640	9.20
Holland L. Redfield II	Republican Party	4,528	7.39
Bent Lawaetz	Democratic Party	4,389	7.16
Alicia "Chucky" Hansen	Independent	3,783	6.17
Douglas E. Canton	Independent	3,503	5.72
Alicia Torres James	Independent	3,406	5.56
Edgar M. Iles	Democratic Party	2,896	4.73
David A. Benjamin	Independent	2,709	4.42
Raymond "Usie" Richards	Independent Citizens Movement	2,687	4.39
William S. Harvey	Democratic Party	2,632	4.30
Keith C. O'Neale	Independent	2,568	4.19
Armando Suarez Jr.	Independent	2,176	3.55
Patrick N. Williams	Independent	2,163	3.53
Frank Elmo Jacobs Jr.	Democratic Party	2,141	3.49
Randall Johns	Independent	2,086	3.40
G. Luz A. James	Independent	1,592	2.60
Valmy Thomas	Independent	1,326	2.16
Jorge Galiber	Independent	1,256	2.05
Hector L. Cintron	Independent	1,237	2.02
Michael Cliff	Independent	889	1.45
Glenn "Butcher" Brown	Independent	852	1.39
Hernando T. Williams	Republican Party	663	1.08
Total		61,273	100.00

== Delegate to the United States House of Representatives ==
US House election, 1986: U.S. Virgin Islands at-large district
Party	Candidate	Votes	%	±%
Democratic	Ron de Lugo (incumbent)	21,767	94.3%	
Independent	Write-in	1,307	5.7%	
Majority		20,460	88.6%	
Turnout		23,074	100.0%	
