= 1978 United States Virgin Islands general election =

1978 United States Virgin Islands gubernatorial election
- November 7, 1978
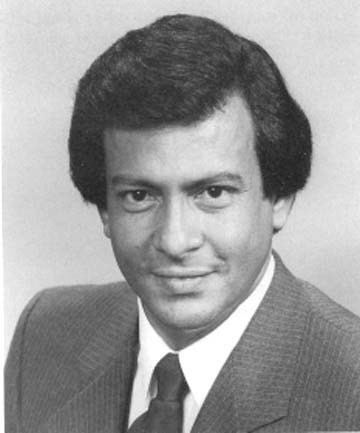

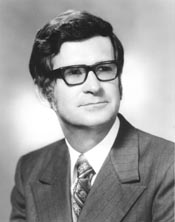
| Nominee | Juan Francisco Luis | Ron de Lugo |
| Party | Independent | Democratic |
| Running mate | Henry A. Millin | Eric E. Dawson |
| Popular vote | 12,100 | 8,111 |
| Percentage | 59.87% | 40.13% |
Results by island
Luis
50–60%
60–70%
70–80%
Governor before election
Juan Francisco Luis
Independent
Elected Governor
Juan Francisco Luis
Independent

The 1978 United States Virgin Islands general election took place on November 7, 1978, to elect public officials in the United States Virgin Islands.

Losing candidates often did not have their political affiliations listed on election returns.

== Gubernatorial election ==
The 1978 Virgin Islands gubernatorial election took place on November 7, 1978. Incumbent governor Juan Francisco Luis, who succeeded to office upon the death of Cyril King, defeated U.S. House delegate Ron de Lugo in the general election.

=== Results ===
1978 United States House of Representatives election in the Virgin Islands
| Party | Candidate | Votes | % |
|---|---|---|---|
| Independent | Juan Francisco Luis | 12,100 | 59.87% |
| Democratic | Ron de Lugo | 8,111 | 40.13% |
| Total votes | | 20,113 | 100% |
| Independent hold | | | |

==== Results by island ====
| Island | Luis | | Lugo | | Margin |
|---|---|---|---|---|---|
| St. Croix | 6,570 | 67.94% | 3,100 | 32.06% | +35.88 |
| St. John | 425 | 75.76% | 136 | 24.24% | +51.52 |
| St. Thomas | 4,905 | 50.15% | 4,875 | 49.85% | +0.30 |

== Territorial Legislature ==
Senator At Large
| Candidate | Party | Votes | % |
|---|---|---|---|
| Cleone Creque Hodge | Democratic Party | 11,687 | 100.00 |
| Total | | 11,687 | 100.00 |

St. Thomas/St. John
| Candidate | Party | Votes | % |
|---|---|---|---|
| Michel Paiewonsky | Democratic Party | 7,615 | 13.37 |
| Athniel C. Ottley | Democratic Party | 7,560 | 13.28 |
| Lloyd L. Williams | Democratic Party | 6,818 | 11.97 |
| Elmo D. Roebuck | Democratic Party | 6,666 | 11.71 |
| Earle B. Ottley | Democratic Party | 5,965 | 10.48 |
| Alli J. Paul | Independent | 5,460 | 9.59 |
| John L. Maduro | Democratic Party | 4,959 | 8.71 |
| Roger C. Hill | | 4,725 | 8.30 |
| John P. Collins | Independent | 2,795 | 4.91 |
| Rahim Khabib | | 1,780 | 3.13 |
| Harold Moller | Independent | 1,417 | 2.49 |
| Glanfield Orascio Testamark | Independent | 1,181 | 2.07 |
| Total | | 56,941 | 100.00 |

St. Croix
| Candidate | Party | Votes | % |
|---|---|---|---|
| Sidney Lee | Democratic Party | 5,352 | 10.17 |
| Leroy S. Arnold | Democratic Party | 4,810 | 9.14 |
| Williams S. Harvey | Democratic Party | 4,094 | 7.78 |
| Ruby M. Rouss | Democratic Party | 4,056 | 7.71 |
| John A. Bell | Independent | 3,913 | 7.44 |
| Eddy Rivera | Democratic Party | 3,791 | 7.20 |
| Hector L. Cintron | Independent | 3,487 | 6.63 |
| Edgar M. Iles | | 3,272 | 6.22 |
| James Bennerson | | 3,042 | 5.78 |
| Ann E. Ambramson | Independent | 2,612 | 4.96 |
| Helen I. Joseph | Independent | 2,252 | 4.28 |
| Holland L. Redfield II | Independent | 2,106 | 4.00 |
| Claude A. Molloy | Independent | 1,959 | 3.72 |
| G. Luz A. James | Independent | 1,866 | 3.55 |
| Jessica Tutein Moolenaar | Independent | 1,311 | 2.49 |
| Leona Watson | Independent | 983 | 1.87 |
| Dante R. Rossi | Independent | 980 | 1.86 |
| Earl S. Walker | Independent | 872 | 1.66 |
| J. Robert Smith | Independent | 712 | 1.35 |
| Edric W. Stanley | Independent | 501 | 0.95 |
| Jose A. Pereira | Independent | 412 | 0.78 |
| Faith Dane Johnson | Independent | 244 | 0.46 |
| Total | | 52,627 | 100.00 |

== Delegate to the United States House of Representatives ==
1978 United States House of Representatives election in the Virgin Islands
- November 7, 1978
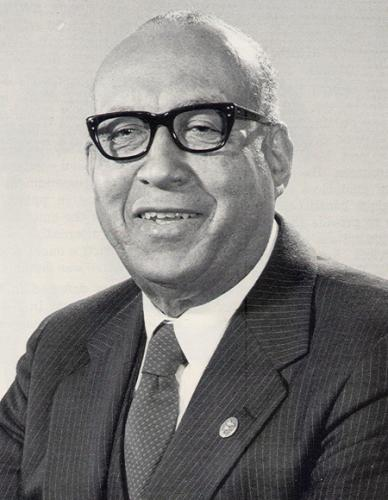

| Nominee | Melvin H. Evans | Jan Watlington |
| Party | Republican | Democratic |
| Popular vote | 10,539 | 9,574 |
| Percentage | 52.40% | 47.60% |
Results by island
Evans
60–70%
Watlington
50–60%
Delegate to the U.S. House of Representatives before election
Ron de Lugo
Democratic
Elected Delegate to the U.S. House of Representatives
Melvin H. Evans
Republican

The 1978 United States House of Representatives election in the Virgin Islands took place on November 7, 1978. Incumbent Democrat Ron de Lugo retired to run for Governor, leaving the seat open. Republican Melvin H. Evans was elected by a narrow margin to only first 2-year term.

As of April 2024, this is the last time a Republican has won a U.S. House election in the Virgin Islands.

=== Democratic primary ===
1978 United States House of Representatives election in the Virgin Islands, Democratic primary
| Party | Candidate | Votes | % |
|---|---|---|---|
| Democratic | Jan Watlington | 4,758 | 51.58% |
| Democratic | Julio A. Brady | 4,467 | 48.42% |
| Total votes | | 9,225 | 100% |

=== General election ===
1978 United States House of Representatives election in the Virgin Islands
| Party | Candidate | Votes | % |
|---|---|---|---|
| Republican | Melvin H. Evans | 10,539 | 52.40% |
| Democratic | Jan Watlington | 9,574 | 47.60% |
| Total votes | | 20,113 | 100% |
| Republican gain from Democratic | | | |

==== Results by island ====
| Island | Evans | | Waltington | | Margin |
|---|---|---|---|---|---|
| St. Croix | 6,066 | 62.90% | 3,578 | 37.10% | +25.80 |
| St. John | 363 | 63.46% | 209 | 36.54% | +26.92 |
| St. Thomas | 4,110 | 41.53% | 5,787 | 58.47% | +16.94 |
