= 1974 United States Virgin Islands general election =

1974 United States Virgin Islands gubernatorial election
- November 5, 1974 (general); November 19, 1974 (runoff)

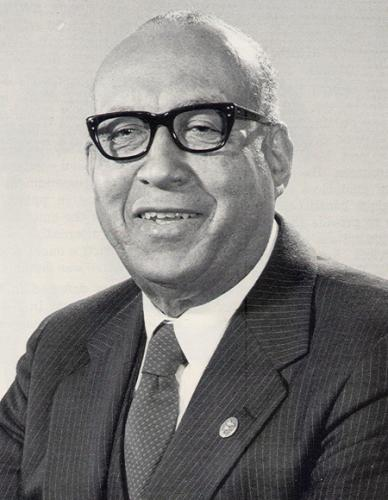
Nominee	Cyril King	Alexander Farrelly	Melvin H. Evans
Party	Independent Citizens	Democratic	Republican
Running mate	Juan Francisco Luis	Ruby M. Rouss	Athniel Ottley
Popular vote	5,688 general 9,419 runoff	6,564 general 8,670 runoff	3,911 general Eliminated
Percentage	35.19% general 52.07% runoff	40.61% general 47.93% runoff	24.20% general Eliminated
Governor before election
Melvin H. Evans
Republican
Elected Governor
Cyril King
Independent Citizens

The 1974 United States Virgin Islands general election was held in large part on November 5, 1974, with a runoff for the gubernatorial election on November 19, 1974.

== Gubernatorial election ==
The 1974 United States Virgin Islands gubernatorial election was held on November 5, 1974, with a runoff on November 19, 1974. Incumbent Republican governor Melvin H. Evans was eliminated in the first round, gaining only 24 percent of the vote. While Democratic candidate Alexander Farrelly placed first in the general election by 900 votes, Independent Citizens candidate Cyril King won the runoff by under a thousand votes.

== Delegate to the United States House of Representatives ==
Incumbent Democrat Ron De Lugo won the House election unopposed with eleven thousand votes.

1974 United States House of Representatives election in the Virgin Islands
- November 5, 1974
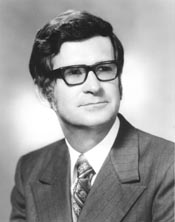
Nominee	Ron de Lugo
Party	Democratic
Popular vote	11,528
Percentage	100%
Delegate to the U.S. House of Representatives before election
Ron de Lugo
Democratic
Elected Delegate to the U.S. House of Representatives
Ron de Lugo
Democratic

== Territorial Legislature ==
The 1974 United States Virgin Islands legislative election was held on November 5, 1974. The Democratic Party won the legislative election with a majority of nine seats, with seven seats in St. Thomas–St. John and two seats in St. Croix. The Independent Citizens Movement won five seats, the at-large district and four seats in St. Croix. The sole Republican Hector Cintron won his seat in St. Croix.

1974 United States Virgin Islands legislative election
- November 5, 1974

All 15 seats in the Legislature of the Virgin Islands
	Majority party	Minority party	Third party
Leader	Elmo D. Roebuck	Claude A. Molloy	Hector Cintron
Party	Democratic	Independent Citizens	Republican
Leader's seat	St. Thomas–St. John	St. Croix	St. Croix
Seats before	7	7	1
Seats after	9	5	1
Seat change	▲2	▼2	Steady
Popular vote	55,252	40,893	14,678
Percentage	49.01%	36.27%	13.02%
President before election
Claude A. Molloy
Independent Citizens
Elected President
Elmo D. Roebuck
Democratic
