= 1972 United States Virgin Islands general election =

The 1970 United States Virgin Islands general election took place on July 30, 1972, to elect public officials in the United States Virgin Islands.

Losing candidates for U.S. House and the legislature did not have their political affiliations listed on election returns.

== Delegate to the United States House of Representatives ==
1972 United States House of Representatives election in the Virgin Islands
- July 30, 1972
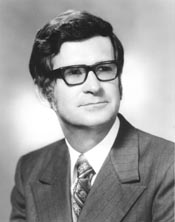

Nominee	Ron de Lugo	Victor G. Schneider
Party	Democratic	Republican
Popular vote	10,752	3,987
Percentage	72.95%	27.05%
Results by island
Lugo
60–70%
70–80%
Delegate to the U.S. House of Representatives before election
Ron de Lugo
Democratic
Elected Delegate to the U.S. House of Representatives
Ron de Lugo
Democratic

The 1972 United States House of Representatives election in the Virgin Islands took place on July 30, 1972. Incumbent Democrat Ron de Lugo was re-elected to another 2-year term.

=== Results ===
1970 United States House of Representatives election in the Virgin Islands
Party	Candidate	Votes	%
Democratic	Ron de Lugo	10,752	72.95%
Republican	Victor G. Schneider	3,987	27.05%
Total votes		14,739	100%

==== Results by island ====
Island	Lugo		Schneider		Margin
St. Croix	4,553	67.78%	2,164	32.22%	+35.56
St. John	321	74.65%	109	25.35%	+49.30
St. Thomas	5,878	77.42%	1,714	22.58%	+54.84

== Territorial legislature ==
1972 United States Virgin Islands legislative election
- July 30, 1972

All 15 seats in the Legislature of the Virgin Islands
	Majority party	Minority party	Third party
Leader	Claude A. Molloy	John L. Maduro	Hector Cintron
Party	Independent Citizens	Democratic	Republican
Leader since	—	1969	—
Leader's seat	St. Croix	St. Thomas–St. John	St. Croix
Seats after	7	7	1
- Gains and holds: Independent Citizens gain Democratic gain Republican gain Multi-member districts: Majority Independent Citizens Majority Democratic
President before election
John L. Maduro
Democratic
Elected President
Claude A. Molloy
Independent Citizens Movement

The 1972 United States Virgin Islands legislative election was held on July 30, 1972, to elect members of the 10th Virgin Islands Legislature. Voters were allowed to choose multiple candidates per district. Independent Citizens senator Claude A. Molloy was elected president of the legislature at the start of the legislative session.

=== Results by district ===
==== At-large district ====
1972 United States Virgin Islands legislative election (at-large district)
Party	Candidate	Votes	%
Independent Citizens Movement	Noble Samuel	5,349	42.58%
Nonpartisan	Vincen M. Clendinen	5,126	40.81%
Nonpartisan	Robert O'Connor	2,086	16.61%
Total votes		12,561	100%

==== St. Thomas–St. John ====
1972 United States Virgin Islands legislative election (St. Thomas–St. John)
Party	Candidate	Votes	%
Democratic	Elmo D. Roebuck	4,590	8.48%
Democratic	Addie Ottley	3,988	7.37%
Democratic	John L. Maduro	3,883	7.17%
Independent Citizens Movement	Cyril King	3,827	7.07%
Democratic	Lloyd L. Williams	3,775	6.97%
Democratic	Eric E. Dawson	3,653	6.75%
Independent Citizens Movement	Virdin C. Brown	3,485	6.44%
Nonpartisan	Roger C. Hill	3,334	6.16%
Nonpartisan	Roy A. Anduze	3,189	5.89%
Nonpartisan	Percival Hugo Reese	3,126	5.77%
Nonpartisan	Ariel Melchoir	2,952	5.45%
Nonpartisan	Freeman Dawson	2,493	4.60%
Nonpartisan	Hugh M. Smith	2,159	3.99%
Nonpartisan	Richard R. Maguire	2,124	3.92%
Nonpartisan	Alfred H. Lockhart	1,847	3.41%
Nonpartisan	Frank Jarvis	1,552	2.86%
Nonpartisan	Elma L. Davis Smith	857	1.58%
Nonpartisan	Jose A. Sprauve	804	1.48%
Nonpartisan	Luther Benjamin	716	1.32%
Nonpartisan	Ito Thomas	549	1.01%
Nonpartisan	Clive Addison Millis	499	0.92%
Nonpartisan	David Vialet	422	0.78%
Nonpartisan	Arthur P. Joseph	264	0.48%
Total votes		54,088	100%

==== St. Croix ====
1972 United States Virgin Islands legislative election (St. Croix)
Party	Candidate	Votes	%
Democratic	Ruby M. Rouss	3,697	8.25%
Independent Citizens Movement	Albert A. Sheen	3,496	7.80%
Independent Citizens Movement	Alexander Moorhead	3,123	6.97%
Democratic	Britain H. Bryant	2,957	6.60%
Independent Citizens Movement	Juan Chin Luis	2,753	6.14%
Independent Citizens Movement	Claude A. Molloy	2,403	5.36%
Republican Party	Hector Cintron	2,337	5.21%
Nonpartisan	Frits E. Lawaetz	2,227	4.97%
Nonpartisan	Jaime Car Claz	2,024	4.51%
Nonpartisan	Warren L. Trafton	1,943	4.34%
Nonpartisan	Felix A. Francis	1,941	4.33%
Nonpartisan	James A. Bennerson	1,911	4.26%
Nonpartisan	Arnold M. Golden	1,701	3.79%
Nonpartisan	Mario N. De Chabert	1,640	3.66%
Nonpartisan	Juan A. Garcia	1,581	3.52%
Nonpartisan	Philip C. Clark	1,526	3.40%
Nonpartisan	Miguel A. Vazquez	1,515	3.38%
Nonpartisan	Aracelis B. Hendry	1,508	3.36%
Nonpartisan	Juanita Smail	1,348	3.00%
Nonpartisan	William Bohlke	1,281	2.85%
Nonpartisan	William S. Harvey	1,019	2.27%
Nonpartisan	John A. Bell	862	1.92%
Total votes		44,793	100%
