= 1982 United States Virgin Islands general election =

1982 United States Virgin Islands gubernatorial election
- 2 November 1982
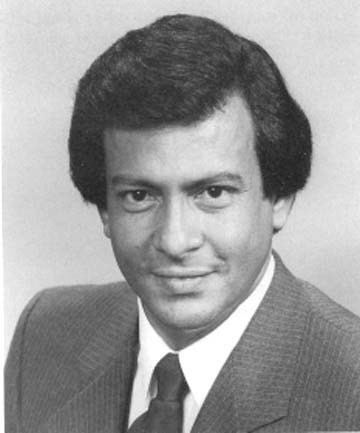
Nominee	Juan Francisco Luis	Henry A. Millin
Party	Independent	Independent
Running mate	Julio Brady	Edgar D. Ross
Popular vote	11,354	4,143
Percentage	53.85%	19.65%
Governor before election
Juan Francisco Luis
Independent
Elected Governor
Juan Francisco Luis
Independent

General elections were held in the United States Virgin Islands on 2 November 1982, to elect a new governor and lieutenant governor, 15 members of the Legislature of the Virgin Islands and the Delegate to United States House of Representatives.

== Results ==
=== Governor ===
Candidate	Running mate	Party	Votes	%
Juan Francisco Luis	Julio Brady	Independent	11,354	53.85
Henry A. Millin	Edgar D. Ross	Independent	4,143	19.65
Derek M. Hodge	Melville Plaskett	Democratic Party	2,539	12.04
Ruby M. Rouss	John A. Bell	Independent	2,471	11.72
Hector L. Cintron	Lucien Alanzo Moolenaar Jr.	Independent	579	2.75
Total			21,086	100.00
Valid votes			21,086	95.17
Invalid/blank votes			1,071	4.83
Total votes			22,157	100.00
Registered voters/turnout			30,065	73.70

=== Territorial Legislature ===
Senator At Large
Candidate	Party	Votes	%
Cleone Creque Maynard	Democratic Party	8,927	54.66
Gilbert A. Sprauve	Independent	7,406	45.34
Total		16,333	100.00

St. Thomas/St. John
Candidate	Party	Votes	%
Hugo Dennis Jr.	Democratic Party	5,982	9.37
Ruby Simmonds	Independent	5,807	9.10
Elmo D. Roebuck	Independent	5,792	9.07
Virdin C. Brown	Independent Citizens Movement	5,170	8.10
Milton A. Frett	Independent	5,147	8.06
Lorraine Berry	Democratic Party	4,818	7.55
Lloyd L. Williams	Democratic Party	4,812	7.54
Iver A. Stridiron	Democratic Party	4,737	7.42
Toya Andrew	Democratic Party	3,917	6.14
Arthur S. Hodge Sr.	Independent	3,447	5.40
Aubrey Nelthropp	Democratic Party	2,810	4.40
Alli J. Paul	Independent	2,394	3.75
Wilmoth B. Nichols	Independent	1,930	3.02
James J. Meehan Sr.	Independent	1,658	2.60
Harry Daniel	Independent	1,436	2.25
Michael Keohane	Independent	1,235	1.93
Clifton Henry	Independent Citizens Movement	992	1.55
Hernando T. Williams	Independent	523	0.82
Melvin E. Connor	Independent	434	0.68
Roy A. Hennessey	Independent	430	0.67
El-Hajj Amin Muhammad	Independent	365	0.57
Total		63,836	100.00

St. Croix
Candidate	Party	Votes	%
Lilliana Belardo	Independent	6,083	11.96
Sidney Lee	Democratic Party	5,451	10.72
William S. Harvey	Democratic Party	4,866	9.57
Kenneth Mapp	Independent	4,056	7.97
Edgar M. Iles	Democratic Party	4,007	7.88
Bent Lawaetz	Democratic Party	3,734	7.34
Adelbert Bryan	Independent	3,721	7.31
Claude A. Molloy	Independent	3,161	6.21
Lyria B. Gordon	Republican Party	2,893	5.69
Holland L. Redfield II	Republican Party	2,832	5.57
George A. Farrelly	Independent	1,778	3.50
Maximo H. Ruis	Independent	1,128	2.22
Edric W. Stanley	Independent	1,107	2.18
Priscilla Watkins	Independent	1,086	2.13
Glenn "Butcher" Brown	Independent	753	1.48
Christian Ryan	Democratic Party	708	1.39
Ingrid Tutein Hendricks	Independent	606	1.19
Michael Stewart McLaurin	Independent	541	1.06
Carl F.Christopher	Independent	515	1.01
Raymond "Usie" Richards	Independent	498	0.98
Andre E. Bertrand	Independent	420	0.83
Ivan B. Espinosa	Independent	325	0.64
Fellis E. Gautier	Independent	297	0.58
Llewellyn Gerald Reed	Independent	158	0.31
Faith Dane Johnson	Independent	147	0.29
Total		50,871	100.00

=== Delegate to the United States House of Representatives ===
Candidate	Party	Votes	%
Ron de Lugo	Democratic Party	17,835	82.77
Frank R. Prince	Republican Party	3,144	14.59
Eric A. Smalls	Independent	568	2.64
Total		21,547	100.00
