= 1990 United States Virgin Islands general election =

1990 United States Virgin Islands gubernatorial election
- 6 November 1990
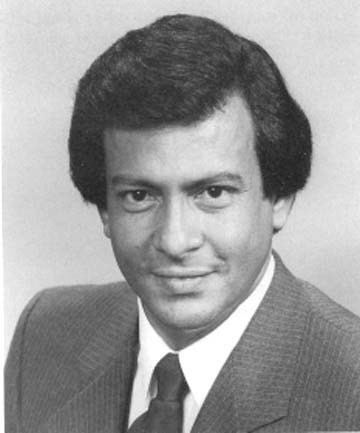
| Nominee | Alexander A. Farrelly | Juan Francisco Luis |
| Party | Democratic | Independent |
| Running mate | Derek M. Hodge | Bingley Richardson |
| Popular vote | 13,714 | 9,230 |
| Percentage | 59.77% | 40.23% |
Governor before election
Alexander A. Farrelly
Democratic Party
Elected Governor
Alexander A. Farrelly
Democratic Party

General elections were held in the United States Virgin Islands on 6 November 1990, to elect a new governor and lieutenant governor, 15 members of the Legislature of the Virgin Islands and the Delegate to United States House of Representatives.

== Gubernatorial ==
| Candidate | Running mate | Party | Votes | % |
|---|---|---|---|---|
| Alexander A. Farrelly | Derek M. Hodge | Democratic Party | 13,714 | 59.77 |
| Juan Francisco Luis | Bingley Richardson | Independent | 9,230 | 40.23 |
| Total | | | 22,944 | 100.00 |

== Territorial Legislature ==
Senator At Large
| Candidate | Party | Votes | % |
|---|---|---|---|
| Almando "Rocky" Liburd | Independent Citizens Movement | 11,192 | 54.00 |
| Robert O'Connor Jr. | Democratic Party | 9,535 | 46.00 |
| Total | | 20,727 | 100.00 |

St. Thomas/St. John
| Candidate | Party | Votes | % |
|---|---|---|---|
| Celestino A. White | Independent | 7,875 | 9.12 |
| Virdin C. Brown | Independent Citizens Movement | 7,356 | 8.52 |
| Elmo D. Roebuck | Democratic Party | 6,791 | 7.87 |
| Arturo Watlington Jr. | Democratic Party | 6,743 | 7.81 |
| Lorraine Berry | Democratic Party | 6,642 | 7.69 |
| Malcolm C. Callender | Independent Citizens Movement | 6,520 | 7.55 |
| Stephanie Scott-Williams | Independent | 6,127 | 7.10 |
| Judy M. Gomez | Independent | 5,593 | 6.48 |
| Allan Paul Shatkin | Democratic Party | 5,471 | 6.34 |
| David A. Puritz | Democratic Party | 5,237 | 6.07 |
| Wayne Adams | Independent | 4,886 | 5.66 |
| Garry A. Sprauve | Democratic Party | 3,836 | 4.44 |
| Glenn Kwabena Davis | Independent | 3,729 | 4.32 |
| Lawrence Benjamin | Independent | 3,397 | 3.94 |
| Roan Creque | Independent | 2,148 | 2.49 |
| Keith Massac | Independent Citizens Movement | 1,544 | 1.79 |
| Wilma Marsh Monsanto | Independent | 952 | 1.10 |
| Avis Hanley-Blackman | Independent | 858 | 0.99 |
| Peter S. Goodwin | Independent | 612 | 0.71 |
| Total | | 86,317 | 100.00 |

St. Croix
| Candidate | Party | Votes | % |
|---|---|---|---|
| Alicia "Chucky" Hansen | Independent | 6,899 | 11.79 |
| Lilliana Belardo de O'Neal | Republican Party | 4,894 | 8.36 |
| John F. Tutein | Democratic Party | 4,571 | 7.81 |
| Holland L. Redfield II | Republican Party | 4,250 | 7.26 |
| Adelbert Bryan | Independent Citizens Movement | 4,223 | 7.21 |
| St. Claire N. Williams | Democratic Party | 4,173 | 7.13 |
| Bent Lawaetz | Democratic Party | 3,918 | 6.69 |
| Michael Joseph | Republican Party | 3,697 | 6.32 |
| Cornelius Evans | Republican Party | 3,126 | 5.34 |
| Edgar M. Iles | Democratic Party | 3,027 | 5.17 |
| David Jones | Democratic Party | 2,953 | 5.04 |
| Cecil R. Benjamin | Democratic Party | 2,235 | 3.82 |
| Armando Suarez Jr. | Democratic Party | 2,181 | 3.73 |
| Carlos McGregor | Independent Citizens Movement | 1,943 | 3.32 |
| Herbert Schoenbohm | Republican Party | 1,428 | 2.44 |
| John A. Boyd | Republican Party | 1,411 | 2.41 |
| Ralph R. Abraham | Republican Party | 1,158 | 1.98 |
| Valmy Thomas | Independent | 1,079 | 1.84 |
| Frank Jacobs Jr. | Independent | 749 | 1.28 |
| Glenn "Butcher" Brow | Independent | 351 | 0.60 |
| Davvin Heyliger | Independent | 167 | 0.29 |
| Gregory J. La Beet | Independent | 103 | 0.18 |
| Total | | 58,536 | 100.00 |

== Delegate to the United States House of Representatives ==
US House election, 1990: U.S. Virgin Islands at-large district
| Party | Candidate | Votes | % | ±% |
|---|---|---|---|---|
| Democratic | Ron de Lugo (incumbent) | 17,205 | 98.6% | |
| Independent | Other | 248 | 1.4% | |
| Majority | | 16,957 | 97.2% | |
| Turnout | | 17,453 | 100.0% | |

== Referendum ==
Should the government of the Virgin Islands be restructured in order to provide for local government?

| Choice | Votes | % |
|---|---|---|
| For | 8,747 | 61.46 |
| Against | 5,484 | 38.54 |
| Total | 14,231 | 100.00 |
