= 1970 United States Virgin Islands general election =

The 1970 United States Virgin Islands general election in large part took place on November 3, 1970, to elect public officials in the United States Virgin Islands, with a run-off for the gubernatorial race taking place on November 17, 1970.

Candidates for United States Virgin Islands's at-large congressional district and the legislature did not have their political affiliations listed on election returns.

== Gubernatorial election ==
1970 United States Virgin Islands gubernatorial election
- November 3, 1970 (general); November 17, 1970 (runoff)
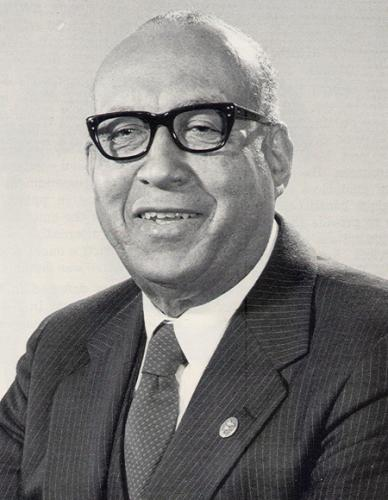

Nominee	Melvin H. Evans	Cyril King	Alexander Farrelly
Party	Progressive Republican	Independent Citizens	Democratic
Running mate	David E. Maas	Hugh M. Smith	Hugh M. Smith
General vote	4,906	5,413	4,628
Percentage	32.82%	36.22%	30.96%
Runoff vote	8,259	7,462	Eliminated
Percentage	52.54%	47.46%

Evans
40–50%
50–60%
King
70–80%
Farrelly
40–50%
Governor before election
Melvin H. Evans
Progressive Republican
Elected Governor
Melvin H. Evans
Progressive Republican

The 1970 United States Virgin Islands gubernatorial election took place on November 3, 1970, to elect the Governor of the United States Virgin Islands with a run-off on November 17, 1970. It was the first election for governor in the territory since the passage of 1966 Amending Act which allowed residents to elect their own governors. While Independent Citizens Movement nominee Cyril King won the first round, incumbent territorial governor Melvin H. Evans won the runoff election by a small margin to a full term in office.

All three nominees in this election have eventually served as Governor at some point, as King would be elected to the office in 1974, and Farrelly in 1986 and 1990.

It is important to known that the election of Melvin H. Evans was last and only time a Republican has won the governorship in the U.S. Virgin Islands.

=== Endorsements ===
Alexander Farrelly (eliminated in general election)

U.S. Senators

- Ted Kennedy from Massachusetts

=== Results ===
1970 United States Virgin Islands gubernatorial election
Party	Candidate	Votes	%
Independent Citizens Movement	Cyril King	5,413	36.22%
Progressive Republican	Melvin H. Evans	4,906	32.82%
Democratic	Alexander Farrelly	4,628	30.96%
Total votes		14,947	100%

1970 United States Virgin Islands gubernatorial runoff election
Party	Candidate	Votes	%	±%
Progressive Republican	Melvin H. Evans	8,259	52.54%	+19.72
Independent Citizens Movement	Cyril King	7,462	47.46%	+11.24
Total votes		15,721	100%	N/A

==== Results by island ====
General election
Island	Evans		King		Farrelly		Margin
St. Croix	1,743	23.02%	3,038	36.86%	3,038	40.12%	+3.26
St. John	55	13.25%	302	72.77%	58	13.98%	+58.79
St. Thomas	3,108	44.66%	2,319	33.32%	1,532	22.02%	+11.34

Runoff election
Island	Evans		King		Margin
St. Croix	3,967	53.51%	3,446	46.49%	+7.02
St. John	109	23.14%	362	76.86%	+53.72
St. Thomas	4,183	53.38%	3,654	46.62%	+6.76

== Delegate to the United States House of Representatives ==
The 1970 United States House of Representatives election in the Virgin Islands took place on November 3, 1970. Democrat Ron de Lugo became the first delegate to the U.S. House of Representatives from the Virgin Islands.

1970 United States House of Representatives election in the Virgin Islands
- November 3, 1970
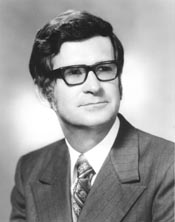

Nominee	Ron de Lugo	Lucia A. Galiber	Victor G. Schneider
Party	Democratic	Nonpartisan	Nonpartisan
Popular vote	5,336	4,772	4,287
Percentage	37.07%	33.15%	29.78%
Results by island
Lugo
40–50%
Galiber
40–50%
Schneider
70–80%
Elected Delegate to the U.S. House of Representatives
Ron de Lugo
Democratic

=== Results ===
1970 United States House of Representatives election in the Virgin Islands
Party	Candidate	Votes	%
Democratic	Ron de Lugo	5,336	37.07%
Nonpartisan	Lucia A. Galiber	4,772	33.15%
Nonpartisan	Victor G. Schneider	4,287	29.78%
Total votes		14,395	100%

==== Results by island ====
Island	Lugo		Galiber		Schneider		Margin
St. Croix	1,978	29.98%	1,901	28.81%	2,719	41.21%	+11.24
St. John	62	15.57%	282	70.85%	54	13.57%	+55.28
St. Thomas	3,296	44.55%	2,589	34.99%	1,514	20.46%	+9.56

== Territorial Legislature ==
1970 United States Virgin Islands legislative election
- November 3, 1970

All 15 seats in the Legislature of the Virgin Islands
	Majority party
Leader	John L. Maduro
Party	Nonpartisan
Leader since	1969
Leader's seat	At-large
Total seats	15 seats
Total votes	121,181
President before election
John L. Maduro
Nonpartisan
Elected President
John L. Maduro
Nonpartisan

The 1970 United States Virgin Islands legislative election was held on November 3, 1970, to elect members of the 9th Virgin Islands Legislature. Voters were allowed to choose multiple candidates per district. John L. Maduro was elected president of the legislature at the start of the legislative session.

=== At-large district ===
1970 United States Virgin Islands legislative election (at-large district)
Party	Candidate	Votes	%
Nonpartisan	Alexander Moorhead	5,713	20.11%
Nonpartisan	John L. Maduro	5,114	18.00%
Nonpartisan	Arturo Soto	4,959	17.46%
Nonpartisan	Augustin Doward	4,654	16.38%
Nonpartisan	Leslie Alfred Millin	4,055	14.27%
Nonpartisan	George G. O'Reilly	3,915	13.78%
Total votes		28,410	100%

=== St. Thomas–St. John district ===
One senator from the St. Thomas–St. John district was required to be elected from St. John, regardless of how they placed in the election.

1970 United States Virgin Islands legislative election (St. Thomas–St. John)
Party	Candidate	Votes	%
Nonpartisan	Athniel C. Ottley	3,544	6.57%
Nonpartisan	Earle B. Ottley	3,494	6.48%
Nonpartisan	Virdin C. Brown	3,402	6.31%
Nonpartisan	Percival H. Reese	3,342	6.20%
Nonpartisan	Ariel Melchior	3,204	5.94%
Nonpartisan	A. David Puritz	3,169	5.88%
Nonpartisan	Freeman Dawson	3,102	5.75%
Nonpartisan	Gaylord A. Sprauve	3,046	5.65%
Nonpartisan	Anthony Cerge	3,008	5.58%
Nonpartisan	Louis P. Hestres	2,982	5.53%
Nonpartisan	Liston A. Davis	2,971	5.51%
Nonpartisan (St. John)	Elroy A. Sprauve	2,917	5.41%
Nonpartisan (St. John)	Theovald E. Moorehead	2,862	5.31%
Nonpartisan	Edward J. Moran	2,834	5.25%
Nonpartisan	Richard R. Maguire	1,641	3.04%
Nonpartisan	Thyra Hodge Smith	1,374	2.55%
Nonpartisan	Luther Benjamin	1,372	2.54%
Nonpartisan	Jacob M. Monsanto	1,292	2.39%
Nonpartisan	Rene S. Danet	1,272	2.36%
Nonpartisan	David Vialet	1,179	2.18%
Nonpartisan (St. John)	Richard Ellington	1,107	2.05%
Nonpartisan (St. John)	Vincen M. Clendinen	652	1.21%
Nonpartisan	Frank W. Lichtenberg II	116	0.22%
Total votes		53,882	100%

=== St. Croix district ===
1970 United States Virgin Islands legislative election (St. Croix )
Party	Candidate	Votes	%
Nonpartisan	Jiame Garciaz	2,483	
Nonpartisan	Lew Muckle	2,400	
Nonpartisan	Philip C. Clark	2,387	
Nonpartisan	Claude A. Molloy	2,368	
Nonpartisan	Hector Cintron	2,335	
Nonpartisan	Felix A. Francis	2,235	
Nonpartisan	Randall N. James	2,179	
Nonpartisan	Frits E. Lawaetz	2,177	
Nonpartisan	Edgar D. Mullgrav	2,161	
Nonpartisan	Arnold M. Golden	2,090	
Nonpartisan	Helen I. Joseph	2,089	
Nonpartisan	Hortense M. Rowe	2,089	
Nonpartisan	Joanna P. Lindquist	2,046	
Nonpartisan	Juan Centeno	2,004	
Nonpartisan	Clifford J. Johnson	1,931	
Nonpartisan	Rafael Escudero	1,777	
Nonpartisan	Santiago Garcia	1,449	
Nonpartisan	Jose Figueroa	1,390	
Nonpartisan	David M. Hamilton	1,233	
Nonpartisan	Faith Dane Johnson	66	
Total votes		38,889	100%
