= Millin =

Millin is a surname. Notable people with the surname include:

- Aubin-Louis Millin de Grandmaison (1759–1818), antiquary and naturalist erudite in various domains
- Bill Millin (1922–2010), personal piper to Simon Fraser, 15th Lord Lovat, commander of 1 Special Service Brigade at D-Day
- Henry Millin (1923–2004), U.S. Virgin Islander banker and politician
- Kay Cathrine Millin Brownbill OBE (1914–2002), Australian politician
- Ken Millin (born 1975), lacrosse player for the Rochester Knighthawks in the National Lacrosse League
- Lori Millin, Democratic member of the Wyoming House of Representatives, representing the 8th district from 2007 to 2011
- Sarah Millin, née Liebson (1889–1968), Kimberley, South African-born writer
- Terence Millin (1903–1980), Irish surgeon

== See also ==
- Milin (disambiguation), Breton surname, its equivalent, "milin" meaning mill
- Akdamus Millin, prominent Aramaic liturgical poem recited annually on the Jewish holiday of Shavuos by Ashkenazi Jews
- Mallin
- Meilin (disambiguation)
- Mellin
- Miellin
- Millen (disambiguation)
- Milling (disambiguation)
- Million
- Mullin
