= Julio Brady =

U.S. Virgin Islands judge, politician and attorney

5th Lieutenant Governor of the United States Virgin Islands
- In office January 3, 1983 – January 5, 1987
- Governor: Juan Francisco Luis
- Preceded by: Henry Millin
- Succeeded by: Derek Hodge

Personal details
- Born: August 23, 1942 Saint Thomas, United States Virgin Islands
- Died: September 16, 2015 (aged 73) Saint Croix, United States Virgin Islands
- Party: Democratic (Before 1986); Republican (1986–2015)
- Spouse: Gwendolyn Hall
- Children: 2
- Education: Pontifical Catholic University of Puerto Rico, Ponce (BA); New York Law School (JD)

Julio A. Brady (August 23, 1942 – September 16, 2015) was an American Virgin Islander judge, politician and attorney. Brady served as the fifth lieutenant governor of the United States Virgin Islands from 1983 to 1987 during the second term of former Governor Juan Francisco Luis. Prior to his death, Brady served as a U.S. Virgin Islands Superior Court judge since 2006.

== Biography ==
=== Early life ===
Brady received bachelor's degrees in philosophy and English from Pontifical Catholic University of Puerto Rico in 1964. He worked at the V.I. Employment Security Agency as an interviewer before enrolling in law school. He then earned a Juris Doctor degree from New York Law School of New York City in 1969.

=== Career ===
Brady began his legal career at the Legal Aid Society of New York, where he worked from 1969 to 1971 as a public defender. He then served as an assistant U.S. attorney from 1971 to 1973. Brady was promoted to U.S. Attorney for the Virgin Islands District, a position he held from 1973 until January 30, 1978, when he resigned to pursue a political campaign for U.S.V.I. delegate to the U.S. House of Representatives.

Brady's ultimately sought the Democratic nomination for Delegate of the U.S. Virgin Islands to the U.S. House of Representatives in 1978. He was narrowly defeated in the September 12, 1978 Democratic primary election by Janet B. Watlington, an aide to former Delegate Ron de Lugo. Republican Melvin Evans defeated Watlington in the November general election to become delegate.

He was also reportedly considered for appointment as Lieutenant Governor by Governor Juan Luis in January 1978 following the death of Governor Cyril King. However, Governor Luis ultimately chose Henry Millin as his Lieutenant Governor and running mate in the 1978 gubernatorial election. Brady practiced law for a private law firm, Isherwood, Colianni, Alkon and Barnard, on Saint Croix after leaving the U.S. Attorney's office. He ran the firm's Saint Thomas office for a time.

Governor Juan Francisco Luis appointed Brady the first federal programs coordinator in Washington, D.C. from 1979 to 1982. He simultaneously served as the chairman of the Democratic Party of the Virgin Islands from 1980 to 1982. Brady was also involved with the Fourth Constitutional Convention held in 1980. He heavily criticized a proposed provision in the U.S. Virgin Islands Constitution that would have required that all future Governors and Lt. Governors of the territory be born in the U.S. Virgin Islands or have at least one parent who was born in the U.S. Virgin Islands in order to hold office. As a guest speaker, Brady told the constitutional delegates, "For you people who were elected by a microcosm of the entire Virgin Islands to decide that for all time we cannot have in these Virgin Islands as governor somebody who was not born here, or whatever definition you use, is - to say the least - the height of arrogance."

In 1982, Lt. Governor Henry Millin opted to challenge incumbent Governor Juan Francisco Luis in the gubernatorial election. Luis chose Brady as his running mate for lieutenant governor in the 1982 gubernatorial election. Luis and Brady won the election on November 2, 1982, with 11,354 votes, defeating Millin and three other candidates for governor. He served as Lt. Governor until leaving office on January 5, 1987, when he was succeeded by Derek Hodge.

In 1986, Brady ran for Governor of the U.S. Virgin Islands, this time as a Republican. However, he was defeated in the election by Democrat Alexander A. Farrelly.

Brady was elected as a delegate to the 1988 Republican National Convention in New Orleans. Brady opposed a move to include a constitutional amendment to ban abortions in the Republican Party's 1988 party platform explaining, "It's a personal and moral issue, and I don't believe government has any business mucking around with it." In the late 1980s, the Legislature of the Virgin Islands expelled then-Senator Kenneth Mapp from the legislature after he failed to re-register as a U.S. Virgin Islands resident after voting in a primary election in the state of Georgia. Brady represented Mapp in the court case challenging his expulsion.

Brady went on to serve as a judge on the U.S. Virgin Islands Territorial Court from 1992 to 1994. The Territorial Court is now called the Virgin Islands Superior Court. By 2006, Brady, a former Democrat, had become Chairman of the Republican Party of the Virgin Islands. He was also working as a lawyer for Innovative Communications Corporation.

In December 2005, Virgin Islands Superior Court Judge Edgar D. Ross retired from the bench. Governor Charles Wesley Turnbull nominated Brady to the Virgin Islands Superior Court on January 18, 2006. Brady's nomination was confirmed by the U.S. Virgin Islands Senate in an 8–3 vote in April 2006 after a series of heated and controversial confirmation hearings. He died in St. Croix after a long illness on September 16, 2015.

Party political offices
Vacant Title last held by Melvin H. Evans; 1970	Republican nominee for Governor of the United States Virgin Islands; 1986	Vacant Title next held by Michael Bornn; 2002
