= 1970 United States Virgin Islands voting age referendum =

Ballot measure in the US Virgin Islands

A referendum on the voting age was held in the United States Virgin Islands on 3 November 1970. After the Legislature of the Islands requested a referendum take place, it was approved by the United States Congress on 6 October 1970. Voters were given the options of 18, 19, 20 or 21, and the winning option had to receive an absolute majority of the vote. Although the results saw 55.67% vote in favor of setting the voting age at 18, when the blank votes were included, this dropped to 46.71%. A lawsuit was subsequently filed on 1 December 1970, and on 21 January 1971 a court decided that the blank ballots should be discarded, giving the 18 option an absolute majority of votes.

Prior to the Elective Governor Acts of 1968, the governor of the US Virgin Islands was appointed. Melvin H. Evans was the first governor elected under the new system.

== Results ==
Choice	Votes	%
Age 18	7,469	55.67
Age 19	726	5.41
Age 20	2,063	15.38
Age 21	3,158	23.54
Blank votes	2,575	–
Invalid votes	131	–
Total	16,122	100
Registered voters/turnout	19'756	81.61
Source: Direct Democracy
