= Politics of the United States Virgin Islands =

Politics of the United States Virgin Islands takes place in a framework of a presidential representative democratic dependency, whereby the governor is the head of the territory's government, and of a multi-party system. United States Virgin Islands are an unincorporated and organized territory of the United States, administered by the Office of Insular Affairs of the United States Department of the Interior. Executive power is exercised by the local government of the Virgin Islands. The judiciary is independent of the executive and the legislature.

Virgin Islands residents are U.S. citizens but the territory has no electoral votes to cast for the president or vice president of the U.S. The territory participates in the nominating processes (caucuses). Citizens cannot elect voting members of Congress. However, in the U.S. House of Representatives, they are represented by a delegate, who can vote in congressional committees but not in the House itself. Such delegates can speak on the U.S. House floor, introduce bills and offer amendments but cannot vote during business as the Committee of the Whole or on final passage of legislation. The USVI has been allowed to have non-voting representation since 1972.

== Federal representation ==
Virgin Islands residents can vote fully in all elections if they become a resident of one of the 50 U.S. states. If residents of one of the 50 states become residents of the Virgin Islands, they can no longer vote for President or for voting members of Congress.

The voting rights of Virgin Islanders have been the subject of litigation. A federal lawsuit was filed in 2011 in the District Court of the Virgin Islands and was subsequently appealed to the Washington, D.C., Circuit Court of Appeals, to provide Virgin Islanders with the fundamental right to be represented in Congress and vote for U.S. President. A similar lawsuit was filed in 2020.

== Law ==
The Revised Organic Act of the Virgin Islands of 1954 is the current Organic Act defining the government of the United States Virgin Islands, which were acquired by the United States through the Treaty of the Danish West Indies of 1916. It replaced the Organic Act of the Virgin Islands of 1936 and earlier temporary provisions.

The Virgin Islands Elective Governor Act made the governor an elected office. Further amendments in 1984 removed the right to indictment for certain crimes and the jurisdiction of the admiralty courts.

There have been several attempts at a constitution. The most recent attempt was the Fifth Constitutional Convention of the U.S. Virgin Islands which passed a proposed constitution in May 2009 but was rejected by Congress in June 2010.

== Executive branch ==
Main office-holders
| Office | Name | Party | Since |
|---|---|---|---|
| President of the United States | Donald Trump | Republican | 20 January 2025 |
| Governor | Albert Bryan | Democratic | 7 January 2019 |
| Lieutenant Governor | Tregenza Roach | Democratic | 7 January 2019 |

The governor and the lieutenant governor are elected on the same ticket by popular vote for four-year terms.

== Legislative branch ==
The Virgin Islands's territorial legislature is the 15-member Legislature of the Virgin Islands. The body is unicameral and comprises seven senators from the district of Saint Croix, seven senators from the district of Saint Thomas and Saint John, and one senator at-large (who must be a resident of Saint John). They are elected for a two-year term to the territorial legislature. There is no limit as to the number of terms they can serve.

== Political party identification ==
=== By age group ===
| Party | Under 18 | | 18 to 24 | | 25 to 44 | | 45 to 65 | | 66 and over | | Total | |
| Party | # | % | # | % | # | % | # | % | # | % | # | % |
|---|---|---|---|---|---|---|---|---|---|---|---|---|
| DEM | 0 | 0% | 678 | 45.68% | 3,156 | 57.99% | 8,522 | 68.35% | 7,935 | 73.86% | 20,291 | 67.32% |
| ICM | 0 | 0% | 15 | 1.01% | 82 | 1.50% | 306 | 2.45% | 366 | 3.40% | 769 | 2.55% |
| REP | 0 | 0% | 65 | 4.38% | 175 | 3.21% | 448 | 3.59% | 364 | 3.38% | 1,052 | 3.49% |
| NON | 1 | 100% | 726 | 48.92% | 2,029 | 37.28% | 3,192 | 25.60% | 2,078 | 19.34% | 8,026 | 26.63% |
| Total | 1 | 0.003% | 1,484 | 4.92% | 5,442 | 18.05% | 12,468 | 41.36% | 10,743 | 35.64% | 30,138 | |

== Judicial branch ==
The U.S. Virgin Islands has a District Court, a Supreme Court and a Superior Court.

Judges on the District Court are appointed by the president for ten year terms, subject to Senate confirmation. They may serve more than one term. This is a federal court, established in 1936, with jurisdiction over the US Virgin Islands, with diversity jurisdiction and bankruptcy jurisdiction. Appeals of this court's decisions are heard by the United States Court of Appeals for the Third Circuit. One courthouse is located in Charlotte Amalie, St. Thomas, and one is in Christiansted, St. Croix.

Judges of the USVI Supreme Court and Superior Court are appointed by the governor and confirmed by the legislative body.

== Administrative divisions ==
The US Virgin Islands have no local governments, the Census Bureau divides them into three county equivalents: Saint Croix, Saint John, and Saint Thomas.
