= 2014 United States Virgin Islands general election =

The United States Virgin Islands general election was held on 4 November 2014. Voters chose the non-voting delegate to the United States House of Representatives, all fifteen seats in the Legislature of the Virgin Islands, and the Governor of the United States Virgin Islands.

== Gubernatorial ==
Governor John deJongh was term-limited and could not seek a third term in office in 2014. Kenneth Mapp went on to win the election after a run off, defeating Donna Christian-Christensen in a landslide with almost 64% of the vote.

== Territorial Legislature ==
All fifteen seats in the Legislature of the Virgin Islands were contested.

Senator At Large
Candidate	Party	Votes	%
Almando "Rocky" Liburd	Independent	12,048	58.53
Ronnie E. Jones	Democratic Party	8,267	40.16
Write in		268	1.30
Total		20,583	100.00
Total votes		27,879	–
Registered voters/turnout		51,326	54.32

St. Thomas/St. John
Candidate	Party	Votes	%
Marvin Blyden	Democratic Party	6,394	10.02
Myron D. Jackson	Democratic Party	6,248	9.79
Clifford Graham	Democratic Party	6,196	9.71
Tregenza Roach	Independent	5,743	9.00
Jean Forde	Democratic Party	5,702	8.93
Janette Millin Young	Democratic Party	5,369	8.41
Justin Harrigan Sr.	Democratic Party	5,228	8.19
Donald "Ducks" Cole	Democratic Party	5,139	8.05
Lawrence "Recon" Olive	Independent	4,112	6.44
Dwayne M. DeGraff	Independent	3,783	5.93
Stephen "Smokey" Frett	Independent Citizens Movement	2,652	4.15
Wilma Marsh Monsanto	Independent	1,829	2.87
C. Milliner-Emanuel	Independent	1,551	2.43
Larence Lary Boschulte	Republican Party	1,306	2.05
Real Deal Bruce Flamon	Independent	1,162	1.82
Jodi Hodge	Republican Party	662	1.04
Charlesworth Halstead	Independent Citizens Movement	302	0.47
Write in		461	0.72
Total		63,839	100.00
Total votes		13,562	–
Registered voters/turnout		26,760	50.68

St. Croix
Candidate	Party	Votes	%
Kurt Vialet	Democratic Party	8,288	12.19
Novelle Francis	Democratic Party	7,318	10.76
Sammuel Sanes	Democratic Party	5,805	8.54
Kenneth Kenny Gittens	Democratic Party	5,451	8.02
Neville James	Democratic Party	5,114	7.52
T. "Positive" Nelson	Independent Citizens Movement	4,891	7.19
Nereida Rivera O'Reilly	Independent	4,757	7.00
Malcolm McGregor	Democratic Party	3,883	5.71
Naomi "Sandra" Joseph	Independent Citizens Movement	3,386	4.98
Jamila Russell	Independent	3,248	4.78
Arthur A. Joseph	Independent Citizens Movement	3,241	4.77
Diane Capehart	Democratic Party	3,130	4.60
Ignacio Llanos III	Independent Citizens Movement	1,716	2.52
Miguel Quinones Jr.	Independent	1,624	2.39
Robert B. Moorhead	Republican Party	1,070	1.57
Linus Louis Lacane	Independent	771	1.13
Arthur Brown Jr.	Independent	490	0.72
Dwight Nicholson	Independent	328	0.48
Kevin Romain	Independent	192	0.28
Write in		3,282	4.83
Total		67,985	100.00
Total votes		14,317	–
Registered voters/turnout		24,566	58.28

== Delegate to the United States House of Representatives ==
2014 United States House of Representatives election in the United States Virgin Islands, at-large district
- November 4, 2014
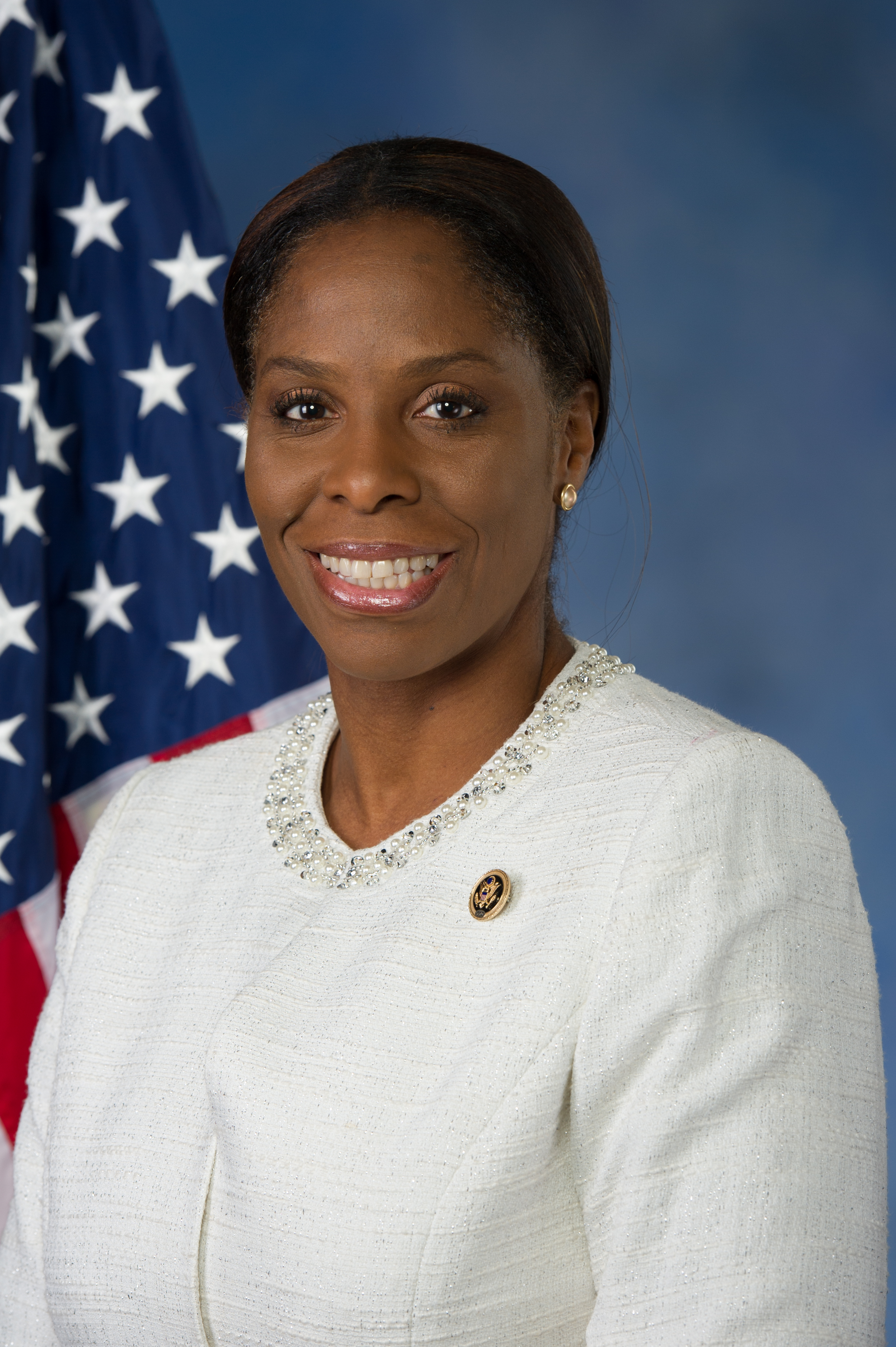

Candidate	Stacey Plaskett	Vince Danet
Party	Democratic	Republican
Popular vote	21,224	1,964
Percentage	90.7%	8.4%
Delegate at-large before election
Donna Christian-Christensen
Democratic
Elected Delegate at-large
Stacey Plaskett
Democratic

The 2014 United States House of Representatives election in the United States Virgin Islands were held on Tuesday, November 4, 2014, to elect the non-voting Delegate to the United States House of Representatives from the United States Virgin Islands' at-large congressional district. The election coincided with the elections of other federal and state offices, including the election of the Virgin Islands' governor.

The non-voting delegate is elected for a two-year term. Donna Christian-Christensen, who represented the district from 1997 to 2015, did not run for re-election. She instead ran for governor. Stacey Plaskett went on to win the general election with 90% of the vote.

=== Democratic primary ===
Primary elections were held on August 2, 2014.

- Emmett Hansen, former Virgin Islands senator and former chairman of the Democratic Party of the Virgin Islands
- Shawn-Michael Malone, Virgin Islands Senator
- Stacey Plaskett, attorney, former Congressional staffer and candidate for the seat in 2012

Candidate	Votes	%
Stacey Plaskett	4,866	49.88
Shawn-Michael Malone	4,134	42.37
Emmett Hansen	750	7.69
Write in	6	0.06
Total	9,756	100.00

=== General election ===
Candidate	Party	Votes	%
Stacey Plaskett	Democratic Party	21,224	90.65
Vince Danet	Republican Party	1,964	8.39
Write in		224	0.96
Total		23,412	100.00
Total votes		27,879	–
Registered voters/turnout		51,326	54.32
