= Henry Millin =

United States Virgin Islander banker and politician

4th Lieutenant Governor of the United States Virgin Islands
- In office March 10, 1978 – January 1983
- Governor: Juan Francisco Luis
- Preceded by: Juan Francisco Luis
- Succeeded by: Julio Brady

Personal details
- Born: March 17, 1923 Saint Thomas, United States Virgin Islands
- Died: February 4, 2004 (aged 80) Saint Thomas, United States Virgin Islands
- Party: Democratic
- Spouse: Graciela Millin
- Children: 5

Henry A. Millin (March 17, 1923 – February 4, 2004) was a United States Virgin Islander banker and politician. Millin served as the fourth lieutenant governor of the United States Virgin Islands from 1978 until 1983.

== Biography ==
=== Early life ===
Millin was born on the island of St. Thomas in the U.S. Virgin Islands on March 17, 1923, to Allan and Lucinda Sewer Millin. Millin's mother was a senator in the Legislature of the Virgin Islands. She is the namesake of the Lucinda Millin Home for the Aged, a nursing home on St. Thomas.

Millin married Angela Correa Irizarry in 1950. They had two children: Ines Lucinda Millin and Henry Orville Millin. In a prior relationship, Millin had a son, Leslie Millin. Henry Millin later married Graciela G. Millin. The couple had two children: Janette and Juliette Millin.

=== Career ===
Millin was employed as an accountant in the U.S. Army Corps of Engineers and the U.S. Marine Corps early in his career. He also worked as a clerk both the Virgin Islands' Office of the Tax Assessor and the former Police and Prison Department.

In 1950, Millin was appointed to the board of directors of the U.S.V.I. Housing Authority. He later become the executive director of the housing authority, holding the position for many years. Millin oversaw the construction of two major housing project complexes, Ludwig E. Harrigan Court on Saint Croix and Oswald Harris Court on Saint Thomas. In the early 1960s, U.S. President John F. Kennedy sent Millin a letter of commendation for his work as the housing authority's executive director. Kennedy recognized Millin for operating one of the best run housing authorities out of the 1,300 in the United States at the time.

He then worked for the West Indian Company on Saint Thomas before taking a position in the Virgin Islands National Bank in 1965, where he worked in the bank's mortgage department. Millin would be promoted to senior vice president of the Virgin Islands National Bank. By 1978, Millin had become the senior vice president of the First Pennsylvania Bank, which had acquired V.I. National Bank.

=== Lieutenant governor ===
Governor Cyril King died in office on January 2, 1978. King's lieutenant governor, Juan Francisco Luis, was sworn into office as the next governor of the U.S. Virgin Islands on the same day. Luis' elevation to the governor's office left the position of lieutenant governor temporarily vacant until Luis could choose his successor.

Governor Luis considered several candidates for Lieutenant Governor of the United States Virgin Islands, including Millin, Edith Bornn, a lawyer from Saint Thomas, and Julio Brady. Luis ultimately chose Millin for lieutenant governor, as well as his running mate in the 1978 gubernatorial election. Millin was initially reluctant to accept the appointment, but reportedly changed his mind through the persuasion of members from each of the U.S.V.I.'s major political parties and islands. Governor Luis announced Millin's appointment as Lt. Governor on February 21, 1978, in a broadcast on radio and television. Millin was a member of the Democratic Party of the Virgin Islands, while Governor Luis was a member of the Independent Citizens Movement (ICM) at the time. However, Luis, who was planning to run in the 1978 gubernatorial election, dropped his political affiliation with the ICM to run as an independent, nonpartisan candidate for governor. Millin's Democratic affiliation was seen as a complement for Luis' candidacy and the nonpartisan coalition he hoped to build. Millin was sworn into office on March 10, 1978, at Government House on Saint Thomas.

Governor Juan Luis and Lt. Governor Henry Millin were elected to a full, four-year term November 7, 1978. They defeating Democratic gubernatorial candidate Ron de Lugo by a wide margin in a tough election campaign. Luis and Millin won 10,978 votes, or 59.2%, while the Democratic ticket of Ron de Lugo and Eric Dawson placed second with 7,568 votes, or 40.8% of the total votes cast. Luis and Millin also won all three of the main islands, including a landslide victory on Saint Croix. James O'Bryan, Jr., a family friend of Millin's who had just graduated from college, served as the Luis-Millin campaign manager and later as Millin's public relations assistant during his term as Lt. Governor.

In 1982, Lt. Governor Millin announced his intention to challenge Governor Luis in the gubernatorial election. Luis named Julio Brady as his running mate, though Millin remained lieutenant governor until January 1983. The 1982 gubernatorial race consisted of five candidates for Governor, including Millin and Luis, who was seeking re-election. Luis won the election with 11,354 votes, while Millin placed second with 4,143 votes. A group of fourteen U.S. Virgin Islands residents filed a lawsuit challenging the results due to the counting of blank ballots, which would have resulted in a runoff election between Luis and Millin, as Luis would have had less than 50% of vote if the blank or incomplete ballots were thrown out. However, United States Court of Appeals for the Third Circuit in Philadelphia rejected the lawsuit, eliminating any potential runoff election between Luis and Million. Millin left office in early January 1983 and was succeeded by Julio Brady.

=== Later life ===
Millin opened and operated a real estate appraisal firm after leaving office in 1983. He ran the business until his retirement in the mid-1990s.

Millin served as the president of the St. Thomas and Saint John Chamber of Commerce for two consecutive terms. He was also a member of the Rotary Club on Saint Thomas. In 2001, the 24th Legislature of the Virgin Islands honored Millin for his contributions to the Virgin Islands Housing Authority.

Henry Millin suffered from declining health during his later years. He died on February 4, 2004, at the age of 80.

Political offices
Preceded by Juan Francisco Luis	Lieutenant Governor of the United States Virgin Islands; 1978–1983	Succeeded by Julio Brady
Party political offices
Preceded by Ron de Lugo	Democratic nominee for Governor of the United States Virgin Islands; 1982	Succeeded by Alexander Farrelly
