= Constitution of the Virgin Islands =

Constitution of the Virgin Islands may refer to:

- Constitution of the British Virgin Islands
- Constitution of the United States Virgin Islands
