= Melvin Warren =

American painter

- Born: 1920
- Died: 1995 (aged 74–75)
- Education: Texas Christian University
- Occupations: Painter, sculptor

Melvin C. Warren (1920–1995) was an American painter and sculptor of the American West.

== Life ==
Warren was born on March 19, 1920. He joined the United States Air Force and later graduated from Texas Christian University.

Warren worked on a ranch in Baylor County, Texas, where he became a painter of the American West, especially cowboys. From 1968 to 1995, he was a member of the Cowboy Artists of America, from which he won a gold medal. He also designed statues, like the miniature deer bronzes he did for governors at the 1974 Southern Governors' Conference. President Lyndon B. Johnson collected his artwork.

Warren died in 1995.
