= Melvin H. Evans =

United States Virgin Islands politician (1917–1984)

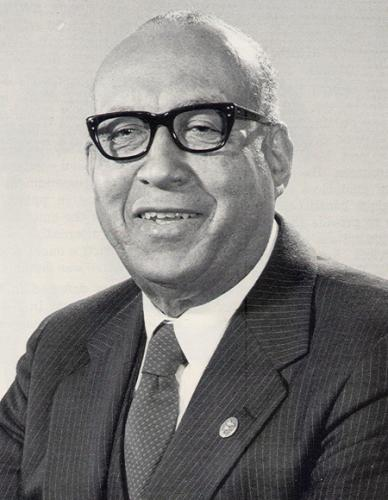

United States Ambassador to Trinidad and Tobago
- In office January 1, 1982 – November 21, 1984
- President: Ronald Reagan
- Preceded by: Irving G. Cheslaw
- Succeeded by: Sheldon J. Krys

Delegate to the U.S. House of Representatives from the U.S. Virgin Islands' at-large district
- In office January 3, 1979 – January 3, 1981
- Preceded by: Ron de Lugo
- Succeeded by: Ron de Lugo

1st Governor of the United States Virgin Islands
- In office January 4, 1971 – January 6, 1975
- Lieutenant: David Earle Maas; Athniel C. Ottley
- Preceded by: Himself
- Succeeded by: Cyril King

10th Civilian Governor of the United States Virgin Islands
- In office July 1, 1969 – January 4, 1971
- Preceded by: Cyril King (acting)
- Succeeded by: Himself

Personal details
- Born: Melvin Herbert Evans; August 7, 1917 Christiansted, U.S. Virgin Islands
- Died: November 27, 1984 (aged 67) Christiansted, U.S. Virgin Islands
- Party: Republican
- Spouse: Mary Evans
- Children: 4
- Education: Howard University (BS, MD); University of California, Berkeley (MPH)

Military service
- Allegiance: United States
- Branch/service: United States Army
- Years of service: 1942-1945
- Rank: Second Lieutenant
- Battles/wars: World War II

Melvin Herbert Evans (August 7, 1917 – November 27, 1984) was an American politician who served as the first elected governor of the United States Virgin Islands and was the first black person elected governor in the United States' history. After his tenure as governor, he served as the territory's at-large delegate to the United States House of Representatives and ambassador to Trinidad and Tobago.

Evans was born in 1917 in Christiansted, U.S. Virgin Islands, and was the valedictorian of his high-school class. He graduated magna cum laude from Howard University and later the University of California, Berkeley. From 1959 to 1967, he was the health commissioner of the U.S. Virgin Islands and oversaw a decline in infant mortality.

President Richard Nixon appointed Evans as the islands' governor, the last one to be appointed rather than elected, and the following year became its first elected governor. His tenure saw a great increase in road construction and he chaired the Southern Governors' Association. He lost reelection in 1974, but he later was elected to one term in the U.S. House.

== Early life ==
Melvin Herbert Evans was born in Christiansted, U.S. Virgin Islands, on August 7, 1917, to Charles Herbert Evans and Maude Rogiers. He was raised by his mother and grandparents after his father moved to New York City. In 1935, he graduated from Charlotte Amalie High School in Saint Thomas as valedictorian.

Evans graduated from Howard University with a Bachelor of Science degree as magna cum laude in 1940, and a Doctor of Medicine in 1944. He received a Master of Public Health from the University of California, Berkeley in 1967. He was a member of Phi Beta Sigma. He studied cardiology under Helen B. Taussig at Johns Hopkins Hospital. He met Mary Phyllis Anderson when she was a nurse at a hospital in New York. They married in 1945 and had four children.

== Medical and appointments ==
From 1942 to 1945, Evans was a second lieutenant in the United States Army Medical Corps. He interned at Harlem Hospital in New York City from 1944 to 1945. At Frederiksted Municipal Hospital in St. Croix he was physician-in-charge from 1945 to 1948, a medical assistant in 1950, and chief municipal physician from 1951 to 1959.

Infant mortality fell to match the national average in the United States and Anopheles were eliminated during Evans's tenure as health commissioner for the U.S. Virgin Islands, which lasted from 1959 to 1967. From 1967 to 1969, he served on the board of the island's Selective Service Board of Appeals. He was the first chair of the board of trustees for the University of the Virgin Islands and president of the Virgin Islands Medical Association.

== Governor ==
=== Elections ===
Ralph Moses Paiewonsky resigned as governor of the U.S. Virgin Islands. President Richard Nixon initially nominated Peter Bove of Vermont, but withdrew after the Republican members of the Interior and Insular Affairs committee refused to support his nomination. Bove faced sexual misconduct allegations and conflict of interests over properties he owned on the islands. Evans, a Democrat who became a Republican in 1968, was appointed by Nixon on June 13, 1969, and confirmed by the United States Senate on June 19. Evans was the first native-born black man to govern the island. Two inaugurations, one on St. Thomas on July 1 and another on St. Croix on July 2, were held for him.

The Elective Governor Acts of 1968 provided for the governor of the U.S. Virgin Islands to be elected. At the time of the 1970 gubernatorial election the Democrats held all of the seats in the legislature and only 1,316 voters were registered Republicans compared to 13,817 Democrats. Evans became the territory's first elected governor and the first black person elected governor in the nation after he placed first in the initial round, which saw the Democratic nominee place third, and defeated Cyril King of the Independent Citizens Movement in the run-off. King attacked him for selecting David Earle Maas, white man, as his lieutenant governor. Evans was sworn in on January 4, 1971, by Supreme Court Justice Thurgood Marshall. He lost reelection in 1974.

=== Tenure ===
During Evans's first year as governor, 25.3 miles of roads were constructed, which were more than were constructed in the previous ten years. The Consumer Protection Council was also formed during his tenure. The size of the United States Virgin Islands Police Department rose from 105 to 445 police officers between 1969 and 1974. He was critical of prior administrations for prioritizing vacation amenities over other issues.

In 1971, Evans appointed George O'Reilly Jr. to fill a vacancy in the legislature created by Lew Muckle's death. Evans was appointed vice-chair of the Southern Governors' Association under chair George Wallace in 1972, and chaired it from 1973 to 1974. He was the first black person to hold each role.

=== Later career and death ===
A liberal Republican, Evans was the U.S. Virgin Islands' member of the Republican National Committee from 1976 to 1980, and attended the 1972 and 1976 Republican National Conventions as a delegate. He supported a failed 1979 referendum for a new constitution for the islands.

Ron de Lugo, the U.S. Virgin Islands' non-voting member of the United States House of Representatives, declined to run for reelection in 1978, and sought the governorship instead. Evans was elected to succeed him, but lost reelection in 1980 to de Lugo. He served on the Armed Services, Interior and Insular Affairs, and Merchant Marine and Fisheries committees during his tenure. He was the only black member of the Republican caucus and the first Republican to join the Congressional Black Caucus, with another Republican not joining until Gary Franks.

President Ronald Reagan appointed Evans as the United States' ambassador to Trinidad and Tobago on November 6, 1981. He was approved on December 1, 1981, and presented his credentials on January 1, 1982. He died in Christiansted after suffering a heart attack on November 28, 1984, and was buried in the Christiansted Cemetery. In 1985, the U.S. Virgin Islands legislature declared his birthday to be Melvin H. Evans Day.

== See also ==
- List of African-American United States representatives

== Works cited ==
=== Book ===
- 1970 Annual Report Virgin Islands to the Secretary of the Interior. United States Government Publishing Office. 1970.

=== Journal ===
- Jones, Charles (1987). "United We Stand, Divided We Fall: An Analysis of the Congressional Black Caucus' Voting Behavior, 1975-1980". Phylon. 48 (1). Clark Atlanta University: 26–37. doi:10.2307/274999. JSTOR 24411793.

=== Newspapers ===
- "155 to Graduate from Howard U." The Washington Afro-American. June 8, 1940. p. 7 – via Newspapers.com.
- "Agnews To Attend Ceremony". The Cincinnati Enquirer. June 24, 1969. p. 3 – via Newspapers.com.
- "Anti-Bus Resolution Given Okay". Coeur d'Alene Press. September 6, 1972. p. 16 – via Newspapers.com.
- "Black Members Of Legislature Have Declined". Santa Cruz Sentinel. November 29, 1978. p. 36 – via Newspapers.com.
- "Black Governor for Virgin Isles". Alexandria News Leader. June 29, 1969. p. 1A – via Newspapers.com.
- "Black Republican To Have Impact In, Out of House". Omaha World-Herald. December 23, 1990. p. 4A – via Newspapers.com.
- "Dr. Melvin H. Evans Is Dead; Served As Envoy To Trinidad". The New York Times. November 28, 1984. Archived from the original on February 24, 2025.
- "Evans Appointed To Islands". Orlando Sentinel. June 14, 1969. p. 1A – via Newspapers.com.
- "Florida governor, Senate contests top 8 state primaries". The Arizona Republic. September 7, 1970. p. 12 – via Newspapers.com.
- "Fraternity To Observe Its 73rd Anniversary". Atlanta Voice. June 20, 1987. p. 7 – via Newspapers.com.
- "Governor of Virgin Islands To Visit City". The Daily Progress. April 12, 1970. p. C1 – via Newspapers.com.
- "Island senator picked". The Morning News. May 20, 1971. p. 2 – via Newspapers.com.
- "Native-Born Negro To Govern Islands". Omaha World-Herald. June 14, 1969. p. 33 – via Newspapers.com.
- "New image among black politicians". Holyoke Transcript-Telegram. December 9, 1980. p. 4 – via Newspapers.com.
- "Nomination Of Bove Withdrawn". The Grand Rapids Press. May 6, 1969. p. 5B – via Newspapers.com.
- "Racial Issue Stirs Race In Virgin Islands". The Tampa Tribune. November 13, 1970. p. 7A – via Newspapers.com.
- "Reagan picks envoys to Chile, Trinidad". Miami Herald. November 7, 1981. p. 26A – via Newspapers.com.
- "Tourists bringing on prosperity". Johnson City Press. January 1, 1970. p. 11 – via Newspapers.com.
- "Virgin Islands' Black Leader". The Des Moines Register. January 4, 1971. p. 6 – via Newspapers.com.
- "Virgin Islands College Board Is Established". The Morning Union. August 8, 1962. p. 18 – via Newspapers.com.
- "Virgin Islands Install Governor". Tallahassee Democrat. January 4, 1971. p. 20 – via Newspapers.com.
- "Voters in Virgin Islands Turn Down Constitution". Miami Herald. March 8, 1979. p. 22A – via Newspapers.com.
- "Wallace Elected Chairman". The State. September 7, 1972. p. 1A – via Newspapers.com.
- Barry, Rey (April 20, 1970). "Virgin Island Governor Ponders Entering Race". The Daily Progress. p. 13 – via Newspapers.com.
- Cuchiara, James (November 3, 1974). "Troubled Virgin Islands Winning Back Tourists". The Pittsburgh Press. p. F5 – via Newspapers.com.
- Hyman, Margaret (April 13, 1970). "Can 700 in the Virgin Islands Elect GOP Governor in 1970?". Miami Herald. p. 30A – via Newspapers.com.
- Rackemann, Francis (April 21, 1970). "A Governor and Doctor". The Baltimore Sun. p. A14 – via Newspapers.com.

=== Web ===
- "A Salute To Our First Elected Governor: Melvin Herbert Evans". University of the Virgin Islands. 2002. Archived from the original on September 19, 2015.
- "Evans, Melvin Herbert". Biographical Directory of the United States Congress.
- "EVANS, Melvin Herbert". United States House of Representatives. Archived from the original on February 24, 2025.
- "Gov. Melvin Herbert Evans". National Governors Association. Archived from the original on February 24, 2025.
- "Melvin H. Evans (1917–1984)". Office of the Historian. Archived from the original on February 24, 2025.
- "Statistical Recapitulation of 1970 General and Run-off Elections Returns" (PDF). United States Virgin Islands. Archived (PDF) from the original on April 23, 2024.
- "The Honorable Melvin H. Evans" (PDF). University of Florida. August 3, 2017. Archived (PDF) from the original on February 24, 2025.

Political offices
Preceded by Cyril King; Acting	Governor of the United States Virgin Islands; 1969–1975	Succeeded by Cyril King
Party political offices
First	Republican nominee for Governor of the United States Virgin Islands; 1970	Vacant Title next held by Julio Brady; 1986
U.S. House of Representatives
Preceded by Ron de Lugo	Delegate to the U.S. House of Representatives from the United States Virgin Islands; 1979–1981	Succeeded by Ron de Lugo
Diplomatic posts
Preceded by Irving Cheslaw	United States Ambassador to Trinidad and Tobago; 1982–1984	Succeeded by Sheldon J. Krys
