= Agnes King =

U.S. Virgin Islander historic preservationist and gardener

First Lady of the United States Virgin Islands
- In office January 6, 1975 – January 2, 1978
- Governor: Cyril King
- Preceded by: Mary Phyllis Evans
- Succeeded by: Luz Maria Luis

Personal details
- Born: Agnes Agatha Schuster; October 21, 1919
- Died: April 23, 2003 (aged 83); Saint Thomas, United States Virgin Islands
- Spouse: Cyril King (m. 1946; died 1978)
- Children: Lillia

Agnes Agatha Schuster King (October 21, 1919 – April 23, 2003) was a U.S. Virgin Islander historic preservationist and gardener. She served as the First Lady of United States Virgin Islands from 1975 to 1978 during the tenure of her husband, Governor Cyril King, the second popularly elected governor of the U.S. Virgin Islands. King focused on the restoration, preservation, and beautification of public gardens and other spaces during and after her tenure as first lady. The First Lady's Garden, located in front of the Government House on Saint Thomas was named in King's honor by the Legislature of the Virgin Islands.

== Biography ==
Born Agnes Schuster, she married Cyril King in a wedding ceremony in Christiansted on August 23, 1946.

Agnes King served as First Lady of the United States Virgin Islands from 1975 until Governor King's death in office in January 1978. During her tenure, King opened the official governor's residences, known as Government House, on both Saint Thomas and Saint Croix to public tours for the first time. She also organized visits and public lectures on government buildings. She also headed beautification programs to transform public and private spaces into renovated gardens.

The 24th Legislature of the Virgin Islands designated the public garden located in front of the Government House on Saint Thomas as the First Lady Garden in recognition of her work in historic preservation and conservation. King was also the recipient of the Clara Barton Bronze Medal from the American Red Cross and received recognition by U.S. President Bill Clinton for her 45-years of work with the organization.

Agnes King died at Roy L. Schneider Hospital on Saint Thomas on April 23, 2003. She was survived by her daughter, Lillia King. King was buried next to her husband in a mausoleum at Kingshill Cemetery on Saint Croix.
