= John David Merwin =

American politician (1921–2013)

John Merwin

8th Civilian Governor of the United States Virgin Islands
- In office September 25, 1958 – January 1, 1961
- Preceded by: Walter Gordon
- Succeeded by: Ralph Paiewonsky

Personal details
- Born: September 26, 1921 Saint Croix, U.S. Virgin Islands, U.S.
- Died: 17 March 2013 (aged 91) Ohio, U.S.
- Party: Republican
- Education: University of Puerto Rico, Río Piedras; Yale University (B.S.); George Washington University (J.D.)

John David Merwin (September 26, 1921 – 17 March 2013) was a politician of the United States Virgin Islands who served in that territory's Legislature, as government secretary (equivalent to lieutenant governor), and as the first native-born governor. He was perhaps the first "politician" to be made governor as previous appointees were primarily men of the military, industry, or non-elected government servants.

Merwin was born in St. Croix. In the 1950s, he became a member of the legislature, during which time he voted for a 10-year exemption on all taxes for businesses with $10,000 of capitalization ($100,000 for hotels and housing industries) and a 75% reduction in income taxes for those industries. He was an avid campaigner for a USVI representative in the United States Congress.

On December 23, 1957, he was made government secretary. The following year, President Dwight D. Eisenhower nominated him for governor on August 4, Congress approved and he was sworn in on September 25.

As governor, he worked to build a second airport on St. Thomas, but that plan was scrapped by his successor. He also worked to boost tourism by attending tourism conventions and even opened a Department of Tourism office in New York City.

Political offices
Preceded by Walter Gordon	Governor of the Virgin Islands; 1958–1961	Succeeded by Ralph Paiewonsky
