= Millen =

Millen may refer to:

== Geography ==
- Millen, Georgia, a city
- Millen Township, Michigan
- Millen, West Virginia, an unincorporated community
- Millen (Belgium), a village in the municipality of Riemst
- Millen (Germany), a village in the municipality of Selfkant
- Millen Range, a mountain range in Antarctica

== People ==
- Millen (surname)
- Millen Brand (1906–1980), American writer and poet
- Millen Matende (born 1982), Zimbabwean long-distance runner

== Other uses ==
- Millen House, a historic house on the campus of Indiana University in Bloomington, Indiana, United States
- Millen High School, Millen, Georgia
