= John Yob =

American political strategist (born 1976)

Chair of the Virgin Islands Republican Party
- Incumbent
- Assumed office May 3, 2024
- Preceded by: Gordon Ackley

Personal details
- Born: John Patrick Yob; July 1, 1976 (age 50) Grand Rapids, Michigan, U.S.
- Party: Republican
- Spouse: Erica Yob
- Children: 2
- Education: University of Michigan (BA)

John Yob (born July 1, 1976) is an American political strategist, consultant, online technology entrepreneur and current Chair of the Republican Party of the Virgin Islands.

In May 2024, Yob was elected Chairman of the Republican Party of the Virgin Islands. He defeated former Senator Lilliana Belardo de O’Neal for the position by a 12-1 vote. Yob succeeded Gordon Ackley to become chairman.

Yob is the son of Chuck Yob.

== Political career ==
Shortly after joining College Republicans at the University of Michigan. Yob served as an executive director and chairman for the College Republican National Committee in 1999. He has previously worked on John McCain 2008 presidential campaign as a state operative in Michigan and Deputy Political Director for the campaign. In 2010, Yob managed the successful campaign of Rick Snyder for governor and then again 2014.

== Personal life ==
In 2015, Yob relocated to St. John with his wife, Erica and their two children.

Party political offices
Preceded by Gordon Ackley	Chair of the Virgin Islands Republican Party; 2024–present	Incumbent
