= Derek Hodge =

U.S. Virgin Islander politician and lawyer

6th Lieutenant Governor of the United States Virgin Islands
- In office January 5, 1987 – January 2, 1995
- Governor: Alexander Farrelly
- Preceded by: Julio Brady
- Succeeded by: Kenneth Mapp

Personal details
- Born: October 5, 1941 Frederiksted, United States Virgin Islands
- Died: May 31, 2011 (aged 69) St. Thomas, United States Virgin Islands
- Party: Democratic
- Spouse(s): Jessica Austin; Beatrice Nevis; Monique Sibilly
- Children: 2
- Education: Michigan State University (BA); Georgetown University (JD)

Derek Michael Hodge (October 5, 1941 – May 31, 2011) was an American Virgin Islander politician and lawyer who served as the sixth lieutenant governor of the United States Virgin Islands for two terms from 1987 to 1995 under Governor Alexander Farrelly. The Virgin Islands Daily News called him a "towering figure in local politics," referring to his political career, which spanned several decades.

== Biography ==
=== Early life ===
Hodge was born on October 5, 1941, on the island of Saint Croix to parents, Rexford Hodge and Enid Kettle Hodge. His mother was the daughter of a British school teacher father and a Farrelly mother. He had one brother – Winston Hodge. Hodge was a cousin of Sir Cuthbert Sebastian, the Governor-General of Saint Kitts and Nevis.

He was raised in the Crucian town of Frederiksted and attended elementary school on the island. Hodge attended high school at Colegio San Justo on the neighboring island of Puerto Rico, where he graduated as class valedictorian and acquired a fluency in Spanish.

Hodge received a bachelor's degree in political science in 1963 from Michigan State University.

As an undergrad at Michigan State, Hodge formed a steel band called the Bamboushay Steel Band consisting of himself, Ariel Melchior Jr. (the future publisher of the Virgin Islands Daily News) and his brother, Winston Hodge.

Following his graduation from Michigan State in 1963, worked as a teacher at schools in New York and the U.S. Virgin Islands, including Brooklyn College, Elena Christian Junior High School in Saint Croix and the College of the Virgin Islands. In 1966, Hodge competed as a center basketball player at the 1966 Central American and Caribbean Games in San Juan with the U.S. Virgin Islands basketball team.

He earned a Juris Doctor from Georgetown University Law Center in Washington D.C. in 1971.

=== Political career ===
Hodge moved back to Saint Croix in 1972 and joined his brother's law firm, Hodge, Sheen and Finch. He became active in local politics and was elected the St. Croix District Chairman of the Democratic Party in 1974. He remained a lifelong Democrat.

In 1982, Hodge ran for Governor of the U.S. Virgin Islands as a Democrat, but without the official endorsement of the Democratic Party. He lost the election. (Governor Juan Francisco Luis won re-election for a second term in a five-candidate gubernatorial race.) Hodge then served as the president of the Virgin Islands Bar Association shortly before his election to the legislature in 1984.

Hodge attempted a successful political comeback in 1984, when he was elected as a senator to the 16th Legislature of the Virgin Islands. He won the most votes in the senate race on Saint Croix. Hodge's colleagues in the legislature elected him President of the Virgin Islands Legislature during his freshman term in office, from 1985 to 1986.

In 1986, Democratic gubernatorial candidate Alexander Farrelly persuaded Hodge to leave the Senate and become his running mate for lieutenant governor in the election. Farrelly and Hodge defeated the Republican Julio Brady and won the election in November 1986. They were sworn in as governor and lieutenant governor of the U.S. Virgin Islands on January 5, 1987. Both were re-elected to a second term in 1990, defeating former Virgin Islands Governor Juan Francisco Luis.

Lt. Governor Hodge and former delegate Ron de Lugo collaborated to obtain $20 million in federal funding for Henry E. Rohlsen Airport on Saint Croix. According to Governor John de Jongh, Hodge also worked to restore a good bond rating for the U.S. Virgin Islands government, which allowed $230 million in bonds to become available for the Virgin Islands' Capital Improvement Program. Hodge is also remembered for lobbying for federal emergency funds to rebuild after Hurricane Hugo struck Saint Croix in 1989, devastating the island's buildings and infrastructure.

Governor Farrelly was term limited in 1994 and could not seek a consecutive third term. Lt. Governor Derek Hodge announced his candidacy for governor in 1994 with the full endorsement of the Democratic Party and chose Alfred O. Heath as his running mate for lieutenant governor. Hodge was defeated in a special gubernatorial runoff election held on November 22, 1994, by the independent ticket of Roy Schneider, and his running mate, Kenneth Mapp. Hodge left office on January 2, 1995, when Schneider and Mapp were sworn in as governor and lieutenant governor.

=== Later life ===
Hodge and his cousin, Kathleen Mackay, opened a private law firm after he left office in 1995. In 2002, Hodge delivered the eulogy for former Governor Alexander Farrelly in Washington D.C.

Derek Michael Hodge died of cancer on May 31, 2011, at the age of 69. He was survived by his first wife, Jessica Margaret Austin Hodge, his second wife, Beatrice Emmy Nieves Hodge, and the last wife, Monique Sibilly-Hodge; two children, Marisol Cohen and Jonathan Hodge; his sister, Coleen Hodge; and three grandchildren, Olivia, Malachi and Hadassah. He was preceded in death by his brother, Winston Anthony Benjamin Hodge, and his parents.

Hodge was laid in state at Government House on Saint Thomas on June 8, followed by a memorial service held at the Episcopal Cathedral Church of All Saints in Charlotte Amalie. He was the flown to Christiansted, where he was laid in state on Saint Croix's Government House as well.

Hodge's funeral was held at St. John's Episcopal Church in Christiansted on June 10, 2011. He was buried in a cemetery in Frederiksted with honors provided by the Virgin Islands National Guard.

Political offices
Preceded by Julio Brady	Lieutenant Governor of the United States Virgin Islands; 1987–1995	Succeeded by Kenneth Mapp
Party political offices
Preceded by Alexander Farrelly	Democratic nominee for Governor of the United States Virgin Islands; 1994	Succeeded by Charles Turnbull
