= Millen (surname) =

Millen is a surname. Notable people with the surname include:

- Ari Millen (born 1982), Canadian actor
- Corey Millen (born 1964), American ice hockey player
- Edward Millen (1860–1923), Australian politician
- Floyd Millen (1919–1998), American politician from Iowa
- Greg Millen (1957–2025), Canadian ice hockey player and hockey commentator-analyst
- Karen Millen, fashion designer
- Matt Millen (born 1958), American football player and executive
- Rhys Millen (born 1972), New Zealand rally and drifting driver
- Rod Millen (born 1951), New Zealand rally driver and vehicle designer
- Steve Millen (born 1953), New Zealand IMSA racing driver
