= Milin =

Milin may refer to:

== Places ==
- Milin, Lower Silesian Voivodeship (south-west Poland)
- Milin, Greater Poland Voivodeship (west-central Poland)
- Milín, a municipality and village in the Czech Republic
- Mainling County, in Tibet

== People ==
=== Surname ===
- Ferdo Milin (born 1977), Croatian football manager and former player
- Gabriel Milin (1822–1895), French Breton-language poet
- Isaak Moiseevich Milin (1919–1992), Soviet/Russian mathematician
- Petar Milin (born 1979), Croatian rower

=== Given name ===
- Milin Dokthian (born 1996), Thai singer
