= Southern Governors' Association =

The Southern Governors' Association (SGA), formerly the Southern Governors Conference, was a United States association of governors founded in 1934 and dissolved in 2016. It was the oldest and historically the largest of the regional governors associations. Since its first meeting 92 years ago to discuss the repeal of discriminatory rates for transporting goods by rail, the SGA had represented the common interests of Southern chief executives and provided a vehicle for promoting them. SGA was a nonpartisan enterprise where shareholders could exchange views and access data, information and expertise on issues of general importance in order to augment the deliberations of public, private and non-profit decision-makers in the American South. SGA operated as an instrumentality of the states.

The last SGA Chairman was Jay Nixon of Missouri. After nearly 82 years, the Southern Governors' Association was officially dissolved on June 30, 2016 by the majority of its members-in-good standing. At the time of its dissolution, the association membership included sixteen states (Alabama, Arkansas, Florida, Georgia, Kentucky, Louisiana, Maryland, Mississippi, Missouri, North Carolina, Oklahoma, South Carolina, Tennessee, Texas, Virginia, and West Virginia), the Commonwealth of Puerto Rico, and the U.S. Virgin Islands.

== Chairs ==
- 1934-35
- 1935-36
- 1936-37
- 1937-38
- 1938-39
- 1939-40 E.D. Rivers Georgia D
- 1940-42 Frank M. Dixon Alabama D
- 1941-42
- 1942-43
- 1943-44 Prentice Cooper Tennessee D
- 1944-45
- 1945-46 Robert S. Kerr Oklahoma D
- 1946-47 R. Gregg Cherry North Carolina D
- 1947-48 William Preston Lane Maryland D
- 1948-49 William Munford Tuck Virginia D
- 1949-50 J. Strom Thurmond South Carolina D
- 1950-51 Fielding Wright Mississippi D
- 1951-52 Allan Shivers Texas D
- 1952-53 Herman Talmadge Georgia D
- 1953-54 Johnston Murray Oklahoma D
- 1954-55 L. W. Wetherby Kentucky D
- 1955-56 Frank G. Clement Tennessee D
- 1956-57 Luther H. Hodges North Carolina D
- 1957-58 LeRoy Collins Florida D
- 1958-59 James P. Coleman Mississippi D
- 1959-60 James Lindsay Almond Virginia D
- 1960-61 Price Daniel Texas D
- 1961-62 Buford Ellington Tennessee D
- 1962-63 Orval Faubus Arkansas D
- 1963-64 C. Farris Bryant Florida D
- 1964-65 John B. Connally Texas D
- 1965-66 J. Millard Tawes Maryland D
- 1966-67 Edward T. Breathitt Kentucky D
- 1967-68 Dan K. Moore North Carolina D
- 1968-69 Robert E. McNair South Carolina D
- 1969-70 Winthrop Rockefeller Arkansas R
- 1970-71 John Bell Williams Mississippi D
- 1971-72 Luis A Ferré Puerto Rico NPP/R
- 1972-73 George Wallace Alabama D
- 1973-74 Melvin H. Evans U.S. Virgin Islands R
- 1974-75 Reubin Askew Florida D
- 1975-76 Mills E. Godwin Virginia R
- 1976-77 Dolph Briscoe Texas D
- 1977-78 James B. Edwards South Carolina R
- 1978-79 Edwin W. Edwards Louisiana D
- 1979-80 John N. Dalton Virginia R
- 1980-81 Carlos Romero-Barcelo Puerto Rico NPP/D
- 1981-82 Richard W. Riley South Carolina D
- 1982-83 William P. Clements Texas R
- 1983-84 Charles S. Robb Virginia D
- 1984-85 Bob Graham Florida D
- 1985-86 James G. Martin North Carolina R
- 1986-87 Martha Layne Collins Kentucky D
- 1987-88 Joe Frank Harris Georgia D
- 1988-89 Michael Castle Delaware R
- 1989-90 Ray Mabus Mississippi D
- 1990-91 Wallace G. Wilkinson Kentucky D
- 1991-92 Carroll A. Campbell, Jr. South Carolina R
- 1992-93 Doug Wilder Virginia D
- 1993-94 Zell Miller Georgia D
- 1994-95 Kirk Fordice Mississippi R
- 1995-96 Mel Carnahan Missouri D
- 1996-97 George Allen Virginia R
- 1997-98 Pedro Rossello Puerto Rico NPP/D
- 1998-99 Don Sundquist Tennessee R
- 1999-2000 Mike Huckabee Arkansas R
- 2000-01 Paul E. Patton Kentucky D
- 2001-02 Mike Foster, Jr. Louisiana R
- 2002-03 Bob Wise West Virginia D
- 2003-04 Mark Warner Virginia D
- 2004-05 Sonny Perdue Georgia R
- 2005-06 Kathleen Blanco Louisiana D
- 2006-07 Haley Barbour Mississippi R
- 2007-08 Joe Manchin West Virginia D
- 2008-09 Tim Kaine Virginia D
- 2009-10 Bob Riley Alabama R
- 2010-11 Bev Perdue North Carolina D
- 2011-12 Luis G. Fortuño Puerto Rico NPP/R
