= Alexander Farrelly =

American politician

4th Governor of the United States Virgin Islands
- In office January 5, 1987 – January 2, 1995
- Lieutenant: Derek Hodge
- Preceded by: Juan Francisco Luis
- Succeeded by: Roy Schneider

Personal details
- Born: Alexander Anthony Farrelly; December 29, 1923 Frederiksted, U.S. Virgin Islands
- Died: September 10, 2002 (aged 78) Arlington County, Virginia, U.S.
- Party: Democratic
- Spouse(s): Catherine; Joan
- Education: St. John's University, New York (BA, LLB); Yale University (LLM)

Alexander Anthony Farrelly (December 29, 1923 – September 10, 2002) was an American politician who served as the 4th governor of the United States Virgin Islands from 1987 to 1995, as a member of the Democratic Party. Prior to his tenure as governor he was a municipal judge and a member of the Legislature of the Virgin Islands.

== Early life and education ==
Alexander Anthony Farrelly was born in Frederiksted, U.S. Virgin Islands, on December 29, 1923. He graduated from St. Patrick's Parochial School in 1940. He served in the United States Army before receiving an honorable discharge. He graduated from St. John's University, New York with a Bachelor of Laws degree and from Yale University with a Master of Laws degree. He was elected president of the Pi Sigma Alpha at St. John's University in 1950.

== Career ==
In 1955, Farrelly started practicing law in New York. He became a Caribbean specialist for the United Nations. Farrelly returned to the U.S. Virgin Islands in 1962, and became an assistant U.S. attorney. Governor Ralph Moses Paiewonsky appointed him as judge of the Municipal Court of the Virgin Islands in 1965.

Running as a candidate for the Unity Democrats in the 1966 election, Farrelly won a seat in the Legislature of the Virgin Islands as an at-large candidate. His vote total of 7,324 was the highest ever received by a candidate at that point. He was reelected to represent the St. Thomas-St. John district.

The Third Constitutional Convention was held in 1977, and Farrelly was made president. He was general counsel for the Fourth Constitutional Convention held in 1980.

From 1976 to 1998, he represented the U.S. Virgin Islands in the Democratic National Committee.

=== Governor ===
In the 1970 gubernatorial election Farrelly was the Democratic nominee, but lost to Republican nominee Melvin H. Evans.

From 1987 to 1995, Farrelly served as governor of the United States Virgin Islands. Farrelly was the first member of the Democratic Party elected as governor and was the second governor to be elected to a second term.

Raphael Joseph, who received multiple life sentences for his involvement in the Fountain Valley massacre, was pardoned by Farrelly.

== Personal life ==
Farrelly married Catherine, who died in 1982, and later married Joan. He died in Arlington County, Virginia, on September 10, 2002.

== Works cited ==
- "Former Governor Farrelly Is Dead At 78". St. Thomas Source. September 11, 2002. Archived from the original on May 25, 2026.
- Johnson, Cecil (May 22, 1950). "Around the Borough". Brooklyn Eagle. p. 10 – via Newspapers.com.

Party political offices
First	Democratic nominee for Governor of the United States Virgin Islands; 1970, 1974	Succeeded by Ron de Lugo
Preceded by Henry Millin	Democratic nominee for Governor of the United States Virgin Islands; 1986, 1990	Succeeded by Derek Hodge
Political offices
Preceded by Juan Francisco Luis	Governor of the United States Virgin Islands; 1987–1995	Succeeded by Roy Schneider
