= Roy Schneider =

5th Governor of the U.S. Virgin Islands (1995-1999)

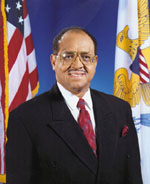

5th Governor of the United States Virgin Islands
- In office January 2, 1995 – January 4, 1999
- Lieutenant: Kenneth Mapp
- Preceded by: Alexander Farrelly
- Succeeded by: Charles Wesley Turnbull

Personal details
- Born: May 13, 1939 St. Thomas, U.S. Virgin Islands
- Died: December 18, 2022 (aged 83) Saint Thomas, U.S. Virgin Islands
- Party: Independent
- Other political affiliations: Republican
- Spouse: Barbara Schneider
- Education: Howard University (BS, MD)

Military service
- Allegiance: United States
- Branch/service: United States Army
- Years of service: 1966–1968
- Rank: Captain
- Battles/wars: Vietnam War
- Awards: Bronze Star

Roy Lester Schneider (May 13, 1939 – December 18, 2022) was a U.S. Virgin Islands politician and physician who served as the fifth governor of the United States Virgin Islands from January 5, 1995 to January 4, 1999.

== Biography ==
Roy Lester Schneider was born on the island of Saint Thomas on May 13, 1939. He attended Howard University, earning a bachelor's degree in 1961 and a medical degree in 1965. He served in the U.S. Army from 1966 to 1968 during the Vietnam War. In Vietnam, he was a medical advisor and surgeon from 1967 to 1968. The United States awarded him a Bronze Star for his service, while the Republic of Vietnam awarded him the Vietnamese Honor Medal First Class and the Technical Service Honor Medal. He became a captain.

After returning to civilian life, Schneider became a physician in his native Virgin Islands. He served as the U.S. Virgin Islands' Commissioner of Health from 1977 to 1987. In 1994, he was elected to the governorship. In 1999, he was defeated for re-election by Democrat Charles Wesley Turnbull. He is considered by the National Governors Association to have been a Republican.

Schneider is the namesake of the Roy Lester Schneider Hospital on Saint Thomas.

== Post-gubernatorial career ==
In February 2000, Schneider and three cabinet members which includes executive assistant Maureen Bryan, OMB director Alvin Battiste and Finance Commissioner Dean Wallace were charged with conspiracy, embezzlement and fraud when the four of them allegedly conspired to pay a $29,000 bill at Marriott Frenchman's Reef Hotel for a room occupied by Walter Brunner, a close friend to Schneider and who was on contract with the U.S Virgin Islands government after Hurricane Marilyn. In March 2000, Territorial Court Judge Ive A. Swan dismissed all charges against Schneider and his three associates and instead set a date for trial on charges of conspiracy, fraud and falsification of records. Schneider pleaded not guilty.

== Death ==
Schneider died on December 18, 2022, at the age of 83.

Political offices
Preceded by Alexander Farrelly	Governor of the United States Virgin Islands; 1995–1999	Succeeded by Charles Wesley Turnbull
