= Ralph Moses Paiewonsky =

9th Civilian Governor of the United States Virgin Islands
- In office April 5, 1961 – February 12, 1969
- Preceded by: John David Merwin
- Succeeded by: Cyril King (Acting)

Personal details
- Born: November 9, 1907 Saint Thomas, Danish West Indies
- Died: November 9, 1991 (aged 84) Saint Thomas, US Virgin Islands
- Party: Democratic
- Education: New York University (BS)

Ralph Moses Paiewonsky (November 9, 1907 – November 9, 1991) was a businessman and politician who served as the ninth civilian governor of the United States Virgin Islands from 1961–1969.

Ralph Paiewonsky was the son of Jewish Lithuanian immigrants to the Danish West Indies. He graduated from New York University in 1930. His degree was in chemistry. His father owned A.H. Riise & Co. Ltd. an apothecary, general store, and a bay rum distillery in St. Thomas. After he returned to the Virgin Islands his father bought the government-owned beverage rum distillery on St. Croix. Ralph Paiewonsky found out that the shortage of water-limited expansion. He proceeded to develop yeast strains that could ferment a mixture of molasses and seawater. After he and his brother Isidor Paiewonsky managed various family businesses, and was the founder of the West Indies Bank and Trust Company in 1954 later acquired by Chase Manhattan. In 1961, he was appointed Governor by President John F. Kennedy.

Paiewonsky's administration established the Department of Housing and Community Renewal in 1962, and began a program of land acquisition and home construction. Approximately 8,000 new homes were built under this program during Paiewonsky's term. He also supported public education reforms and the establishment of the University of the Virgin Islands in 1962. When he appeared on the TV show "To Tell The Truth" he donated his winnings to the University of the Virgin Islands. Paiewonsky served as chairman of the university's board of directors until his death; the university's library on St. Thomas is named for Paiewonsky.

Paiewonsky was a delegate to Democratic National Conventions between 1940 and 1960, and served as National Democratic Committeeman from the Virgin Islands. He was awarded honorary degrees from Tufts University and Fairleigh Dickinson University in 1967. In 1991, he published an autobiography, "Memoirs of A Governor."

Preceded by John David Merwin	Governor of the U.S. Virgin Islands; 1961–1969	Succeeded by Cyril E. King
