= Eric E. Dawson =

American politician

Member of the U.S. Virgin Islands Senate
- In office 1972–1979

Member of the U.S. Virgin Islands Senate
- In office 1985–1987

Personal details
- Born: December 26, 1937; Charlotte Amalie, United States Virgin Islands
- Died: January 2, 2017 (aged 79); Melbourne, Florida, U.S.

Eric E. Dawson (December 26, 1937 – January 2, 2017) was an American politician.

Dawson was born in Charlotte Amalie, U.S. Virgin Islands. He graduated from Charlotte Amalie High School and served in the United States Air Force. He received his degrees in business from New York University and in law from Howard University. He served in the Legislature of the Virgin Islands from 1972 to 1979 and from 1985 to 1987 and was a Democrat. In 1978 he ran on a United States Virgin Islands gubernatorial ticket with Ron de Lugo and lost the election. Dawson served as the executive secretary and chief legal counsel for the United States Virgin Islands Legislature. Dawson also served as the commissioner of the United States Virgin Islands Department of Economic Development and Agriculture from 1987 to 1993. Dawson served on the United States Virgin Islands Port Authority and was the chair of the board. He wrote the book: 'Down Street, Saint Thomas and Beyond: A Dynamic Neighborhood and Its Adjacent Communities.' Dawson died in Melbourne, Florida.
