= Elective Governor Acts of 1968 =

Virgin Islands Elective Governor Act
- Long title: An Act to provide for the popular election of the Governor of the Virgin Islands, and for other purposes.
- Enacted by: the 90th United States Congress

Citations
- Public law: Pub. L. 90–496
- Statutes at Large: 82 Stat. 837

Codification
- Acts amended: Revised Organic Act of the Virgin Islands

Legislative history
- Signed into law by President Lyndon B. Johnson on August 23, 1968

Guam Elective Governor Act
- Long title: An Act to provide for the popular election of the Governor of Guam, and for other purposes.
- Enacted by: the 90th United States Congress

Citations
- Public law: Pub. L. 90–497
- Statutes at Large: 82 Stat. 842

Codification
- Acts amended: Guam Organic Act of 1950

Legislative history
- Signed into law by President Lyndon B. Johnson on September 11, 1968

The Elective Governor Acts of 1968 are a pair of acts passed by the 90th United States Congress in 1968, which provide for the Governor of the U.S. Virgin Islands and the Governor of Guam to be popularly elected, rather than appointed as they had been up to that point. The two acts are individually titled the Virgin Islands Elective Governor Act (Pub.L. 90-496, 82 Stat. 837, passed 23 August 1968) and the Guam Elective Governor Act (Pub.L. 90-497, 82 Stat. 842, passed 1 September 1968). The impetus for the acts came from extensive lobbying efforts by both Guamanians and Virgin Islanders. The Guam Legislature, led by Speaker Antonio Borja Won Pat, had begun lobbying Congress for popular elections in 1962. In the Virgin Islands, the act stemmed from the recommendations of the territory's first Constitutional Convention in 1964–5, which included the popular election of the governor. The acts were seen as a breakthrough for political reform both in Guam and the Virgin Islands. The Guam act was controversial, however, for authorizing federal auditing of the territory's accounts by the Interior Department—a practice that remained in place as of 2020.

== See also ==
- Guam Organic Act of 1950
- Revised Organic Act of the Virgin Islands
