= Juan Francisco Luis =

3rd Governor of the United States Virgin Islands

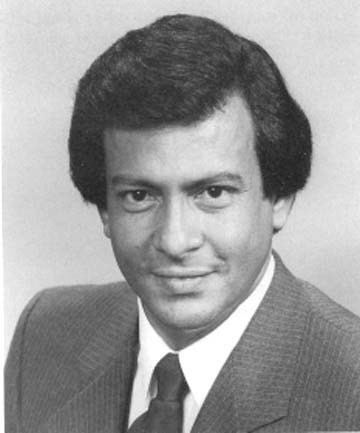

3rd Governor of the United States Virgin Islands
- In office January 2, 1978 – January 5, 1987
- Lieutenant: Henry Millin; Julio Brady
- Preceded by: Cyril King
- Succeeded by: Alexander Farrelly

3rd Lieutenant Governor of the United States Virgin Islands
- In office January 6, 1975 – January 2, 1978
- Governor: Cyril King
- Preceded by: Athniel C. Ottley
- Succeeded by: Henry Millin

Personal details
- Born: July 10, 1940 Vieques, Puerto Rico
- Died: June 4, 2011 (aged 70) Saint Croix, United States Virgin Islands
- Party: Democratic (before 1974); Independent Citizens Movement (1974–1978); Independent (1978–2011)
- Spouse: Luz Guadalupe
- Children: 2
- Education: Interamerican University of Puerto Rico (BS)

Military service
- Allegiance: United States
- Branch/service: United States Army
- Rank: Sergeant

Juan Francisco Luis (July 10, 1940 – June 4, 2011) was a Puerto Rican-U.S. Virgin Islander politician who served as the third governor of the United States Virgin Islands, and the territory's 23rd governor overall. As lieutenant governor, Luis assumed the governorship on January 2, 1978, succeeding Governor Cyril King, who died in office. He served as governor from 1978 until 1987, becoming the longest-serving governor in the history of the U.S. Virgin Islands.

== Biography ==
=== Early years ===
Juan Francisco Luis was born July 10, 1940 on the neighboring island of Vieques in Puerto Rico. He moved with his family to St. Croix in the U.S. Virgin Islands—which has a sizeable Puerto Rican community—when he was two months old. In 1958, Luis graduated from the former Christiansted High School as his class's valedictorian.

He studied at the Interamerican University of Puerto Rico, and after college moved back to St. Croix, where he took a position as a sixth-grade teacher at the Christiansted Public Grammar School. He also worked as a project office manager for the Department of Housing and Urban Development before serving in the United States Army.

Luis was honorably discharged from the Army in 1968 with the rank of sergeant. He returned to St. Croix after his discharge, where he married his wife, the former Luz Maria Guadalupe. In 1968, he became a personnel administrative officer in the Virgin Islands Department of Health. Luis held several positions in the private sector from 1970 to 1972: he worked for Litwin Corporation as an industrial relations manager, for Burns International as an accountant, and as a personnel manager and comptroller at the Estate Carlton Hotel.

== Political career ==
Luis was elected to the 10th Legislature of the Virgin Islands, the territory's unicameral legislative body, in 1972, when he was 32 years old. He served a single two-year term as a Senator before seeking higher office in 1974.

=== Lieutenant governor ===
In 1974, gubernatorial candidate Cyril King, who had founded the Independent Citizens Movement (ICM) in the 1960s, persuaded Luis to join his ticket as his running mate for lieutenant governor. King and Luis were elected as governor and lieutenant governor, defeating the Democratic ticket of Alexander Farrelly and Ruby Rouss.

=== Governor of the U.S. Virgin Islands ===
Governor King died of stomach cancer on January 2, 1978. As lieutenant governor, Luis was sworn into office ten minutes after King's death to fill the remainder of his term.

On February 21, 1978, Governor Luis appointed banker Henry Millin, a Democrat, as his first lieutenant governor. Millin was sworn in on March 10, 1978. Later in 1978, Luis chose to run for a full term as governor as an independent, dropping his previous political affiliation with the ICM; Millin was his running mate.

Luis and Millin were elected to a four-year term on November 7, 1978. They defeated the Democratic ticket of Ron de Lugo, the-then Delegate of the U.S. Virgin Islands to the U.S. House of Representatives, and Senator Eric E. Dawson, in a tough election campaign. Luis and Millin won 10,978 votes (59.2%) to 7,568 votes (40.8%) for de Lugo and Dawson. The Luis-Millin ticket won all three major islands in the election, including a landslide win on St. Croix. Luis and Millin were inaugurated January 4, 1979, at a ceremony in Christiansted.

In 1982, Luis announced that he would seek re-election to a second full term. However, Millin chose to challenge Luis in the election. Luis needed a new running mate and he selected Julio Brady to replace Millin on the ticket.

Luis was re-elected on November 2, 1982, in a five-candidate race. Luis and Brady finished first with 11,354 votes and were declared the winners. Millin's ticket placed second with 4,143 votes. However, the election was challenged in court by fourteen Virgin Islands residents, who argued that blank and spoiled ballots should be counted. By law, a gubernatorial candidate in the U.S. Virgin Islands must garner more than 50% of vote to avoid a runoff; Luis would have fallen just short of 50% if blank and spoiled ballots were counted. A lower court in the Virgin Islands agreed with those arguing for a runoff and ordered the blank and spoiled ballots to be counted, which brought Luis below 50%. However, the United States Court of Appeals for the Third Circuit in Philadelphia rejected the lower court ruling and allowed blank and spoiled ballots to be excluded, giving Luis a majority of the total votes cast. Luis and Lt. Governor Julio Brady were sworn in January 3, 1983.

Luis created a new office, the federal programs coordinator, which worked to better coordinate federal funding and cultivate better relations with U.S. federal agencies, such as the Office of Insular Affairs. He is credited by many with the overhaul and creation of the U.S. Virgin Islands' present health care system during his time in office. Luis successfully lobbied for federal funding that was used to construct most of the U.S. Virgin Islands' modern hospitals, including the Governor Juan F. Luis Hospital & Medical Center on St. Croix, the Myrah Keating Smith Clinic on St. John and the Schneider Regional Medical Center on St. Thomas. In education, Luis abolished the practice of holding two separate sessions of school at the same school during the day.

He spearheaded the expansion of the Henry E. Rohlsen Airport on St. Croix and the Cyril E. King Airport on St. Thomas. He also oversaw the construction of other infrastructure projects, including the creation of a container terminal on St. Croix. The first desalination plant was constructed by the V.I. Water and Power Authority during Luis' administration.

Luis was also credited with launching the political careers of some of the U.S. Virgin Islands' most prominent politicians. They included former Senator Holland Redfield, whom he appointed to the Public Services Commission and encouraged to run for the Legislature in 1984, and Governor John de Jongh Jr., whom Luis nominated to the V.I. Industrial Development Commission, which launched de Jongh's career in public service.

Luis was barred from seeking a third consecutive term in the 1986 gubernatorial election due to term limits. He was succeeded by Alexander Farrelly on January 5, 1987.

=== Later life ===
In 1990, Luis once again ran for election as governor. However, he was defeated by his successor Alexander Farrelly, who won re-election.

Luis was hospitalized at the Governor Juan F. Luis Hospital & Medical Center on St. Croix on June 3, 2011. He died at the hospital the next day, at the age of 70. His funeral mass was held at the Holy Cross Catholic Church in Christiansted. He was buried at Kingshill Cemetery in Kingshill following a graveside service, which included full military honors by the Virgin Islands National Guard.

Luis was survived by his wife, former First Lady Luz Maria Guadalupe Luis; their children, Carlotta Amalia Luis and Juan Francisco Luis Jr.; his sister, Lydia Cintron-Monell; and two brothers, Carlos Monell and Esteban Monell, Jr.

He died less than a week after the passing of another U.S. Virgin Islands political figure, former Lt. Governor Derek Hodge.

== See also ==
- List of minority governors and lieutenant governors in the United States
- List of Puerto Ricans

Political offices
Preceded by Cyril King	Governor of the United States Virgin Islands; 1978–1987	Succeeded by Alexander Farrelly
