= Ruby M. Rouss =

American politician

- Ruby Rouss, 1974
- Born: Ruby Margaret Rouss; 3 December 1921; Christiansted, U.S. Virgin Islands
- Died: 8 May 1988 (aged 66); Christiansted, St. Croix, U.S. Virgin Islands
- Burial place: Kingshill Cemetery, Christiansted, St. Croix, U.S. Virgin Islands
- Other name: Ruby Rouse
- Occupations: US Army Women's Army Corps, politician
- Years active: 1943–1988

Ruby M. Rouss (3 December 1921 – 8 May 1988) was an American citizen born on Saint Croix in the US Virgin Islands. Her career was marked by a series of firsts. She was the first Virgin Islander in the Women's Army Corps (WAC), first African-American woman to serve on General Eisenhower’s staff, and first black woman assigned as a permanent staff of Supreme Headquarters Allied Powers Europe. After a 20-year military career, she retired from service and became the first woman parole officer in St. Croix. In 1973, she was elected as one of the first women to serve in the Virgin Island's legislature. In 1981, Rouss served as the first female President of the Virgin Islands Legislature, becoming the first black woman to lead a legislature in the United States. She was elected to serve a second presidency of the Senate in 1987 and died the following year. Posthumously, she was inducted into the Virgin Island's Women's Hall of Fame and a housing project in St. Croix was renamed in her honor.

== Biography ==
Ruby Margaret Rouss was born on 3 December 1921 in Christiansted on Saint Croix, U.S. Virgin Islands to William and Emmeline Rouse. Her father was a wharf porter, originally from St. Croix and her mother, Emmeline (Grant née Clifton) was from St. Kitts. Rouse attended elementary school and began high school in Christiansted, but when she was fifteen, moved to the United States. She lived with her brother Stephen Grant in Manhattan and completed her secondary schooling at Washington Irving High School, in New York City. She later earned an associate degree while in the U.S. Army.

=== Military career ===
After completing high school in New York, on 23 January 1943, Rouss joined the Women's Army Corps (WAC), as its first Virgin Islander. She became a member of the drill team at Fort Dix, New Jersey, and was assigned as the first black woman to General Eisenhower’s staff during World War II. When the Supreme Headquarters Allied Powers Europe (SHAPE) was organized in 1951, Rouss was the first black woman permanently assigned to it. In 1953, she married a civilian and continued her service until 1 May 1963, when she was honorably discharged and returned to the Virgin Islands. She was hired by the Harvey Aluminum Plant, the firm's first woman employee, to head the office staff. In 1965, became the first woman parole and probation officer of St. Croix. By 1966, Rouss was divorced and took in a niece to provide for her care. Later that same year, she took in three foster children from the Queen Louise Home for Children.

=== Politics ===
Rouss became involved in politics almost immediately after returning to St. Croix, participating as a delegate in the 1964 first Constitutional Convention. In 1968, Rouss was the Virgin Island's delegate to the Democratic Convention held in Chicago and served as one of the five black women on the Rules Committee. Then in 1970, she made her first bid for elected office in the Virgin Islands, running unsuccessfully for a seat in the Senate. In the 1972 election, Rouss finally succeeded in winning a Senate seat in the 10th legislature, becoming one of the first woman Legislators in the Virgin Islands. She served as chair of the Committee on Health and Welfare and by January 1973 was involved in an investigation of the Insular Training School. That same year, in May, Rouss submitted a report of recommendations to improve services for the children housed there. Two years later, she ran for lieutenant governor, but lost the election. Rouss resigned from her post as probation officer in 1975 after serving for a decade.

In 1976 Rouss ran for reelection as Senator, but came in 6th in the race. Two years later, she won again and then went on to serve in 13th, 14th, 16th and 17th legislatures. She opened her term in the 13th legislature by sponsoring a bill to provide financial assistance for tuition or services to parents or guardians of special needs children, if there were no help facilities on their home island. During the same term, she served as chair of the Committee on Health, chair of the Subcommittee on Corrections and chair of the Subcommittee on Water and Power Authorities. In these capacities, she worked to secure the jobs of mental health workers, investigate unsafe prison conditions, and provide public services for poverty stricken constituents. In the 14th legislature, she was elected as the president of the Senate (1981–1982), becoming the first woman to preside over a legislature in the Virgin Islands and the "first black woman to head a Legislature in the United States". In 1982, she drove a bill to create the Virgin Islands Bureau of Audit Control in an effort to gain better oversight of the financial management of the island and the secure the autonomy of the Audit Bureau. That same year, Rouss ran unsuccessfully for governor, but was reelected to the Senate in 1985 and as Senate president in 1987.

Rouss died on 8 May 1988 of complications from diabetes in St. Croix Hospital, Christiansted, St. Croix and was buried in the Kingshill Cemetery in Christiansted. Immediately following her death, she received accolades for her years of service from both the Legislature of the Virgin Islands and the United States Congress. Posthumously, she was inducted into the Virgin Islands Women's Hall of Fame in 2005. In a ceremony held on 17 June 2008, the Watergut Housing Complex on St. Croix was renamed the Ruby M. Rouss Housing Complex, in her honor.

== Sources ==
- Bradley, Valerie (12 September 1968). "Militant Black Women Move". Jet. 34 (23). Chicago, Illinois: Johnson Publication: 22–28. ISSN 0021-5996.
- Congressional Record: Proceedings and Debates of the 100th Congress Second Session (Volume 134, Part 8 ed.). Washington, D.C.: Government Printing Office. 20 May 1988.
- Taylor, John Reilly (2011). The Camp Follower: We all thought that the Cook was the Spy. Bloomington, Indiana: Xlibris Corporation. ISBN 978-1-4691-3850-3.
