= Republican Party of the Virgin Islands =

Virgin Islands affiliate of the Republican Party

Republican Party in the Virgin Islands
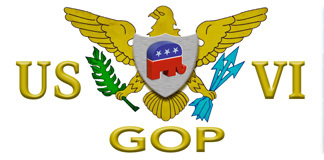
- Chairman: John Yob
- National Committeewoman: April Newland
- National Committeeman: Johann A. Clendenin
- Founded: 1948
- Headquarters: P.O. Box 9901 St. Thomas, VI 00801
- Ideology: Conservatism
- National affiliation: Republican Party
- Colors: Red
- Legislature of the Virgin Islands: 0 / 15
- U.S. House of Representatives: 0 / 1

Election symbol

Website
- www.rpvi.org

The Republican Party in the Virgin Islands is a political party in the U.S. Virgin Islands, and is affiliated with the Republican Party at the national level.

John Canegata was the party chairman until the 2020 Republican National Convention at which the Republican National Committee removed him as chairman for violations of party rules. He was replaced by Gordon Ackley, who served as chairman from 2022 until resigning in 2024. John Yob was elected to fill the vacancy in May 2024. Johann A. Clendenin serves on the Republican National Committee as national committeeman.

The party has a small influence in the islands, failing to be competitive in gubernatorial elections for over three decades.

== History ==
Founded in 1948 as a committee under the leadership of Roy Gordon, it was the successor to the Republican Club of the Virgin Islands founded by Adolph Achille Gereau in 1924.

Melvin H. Evans, who was the territory's first elected governor, was a Republican. He later served in Congress. Former Governor Kenneth Mapp had been a Republican member of the Virgin Islands Legislature, but was elected to the territorial governorship as an independent. Previously the lieutenant governor, he was the Republican nominee for Congress in 1996.

== Republican National Convention ==
Under national Republican Party rules, the Virgin Islands sends nine delegates to the Republican National Convention. During the 2016 U.S. Virgin Islands Republican presidential caucuses, The Virgin Islands Republican Party disqualified all six of the delegates that had been elected on the grounds that they had failed to comply with party rules that stated acceptance of election must be made in writing. They were replaced by the candidates who finished 7th-12th. This was attributed to an internal feud between U.S. Virgin Islands Republicans and former Rand Paul advisor John Yob, whom had recently moved to the U.S. Virgin Islands from Michigan.

== See also ==
- Politics of the United States Virgin Islands
- Republican Party presidential debates, 2012
- Republican Party presidential primaries, 2012
- Results of the 2012 Republican Party presidential primaries
