= Cyril King =

American politician

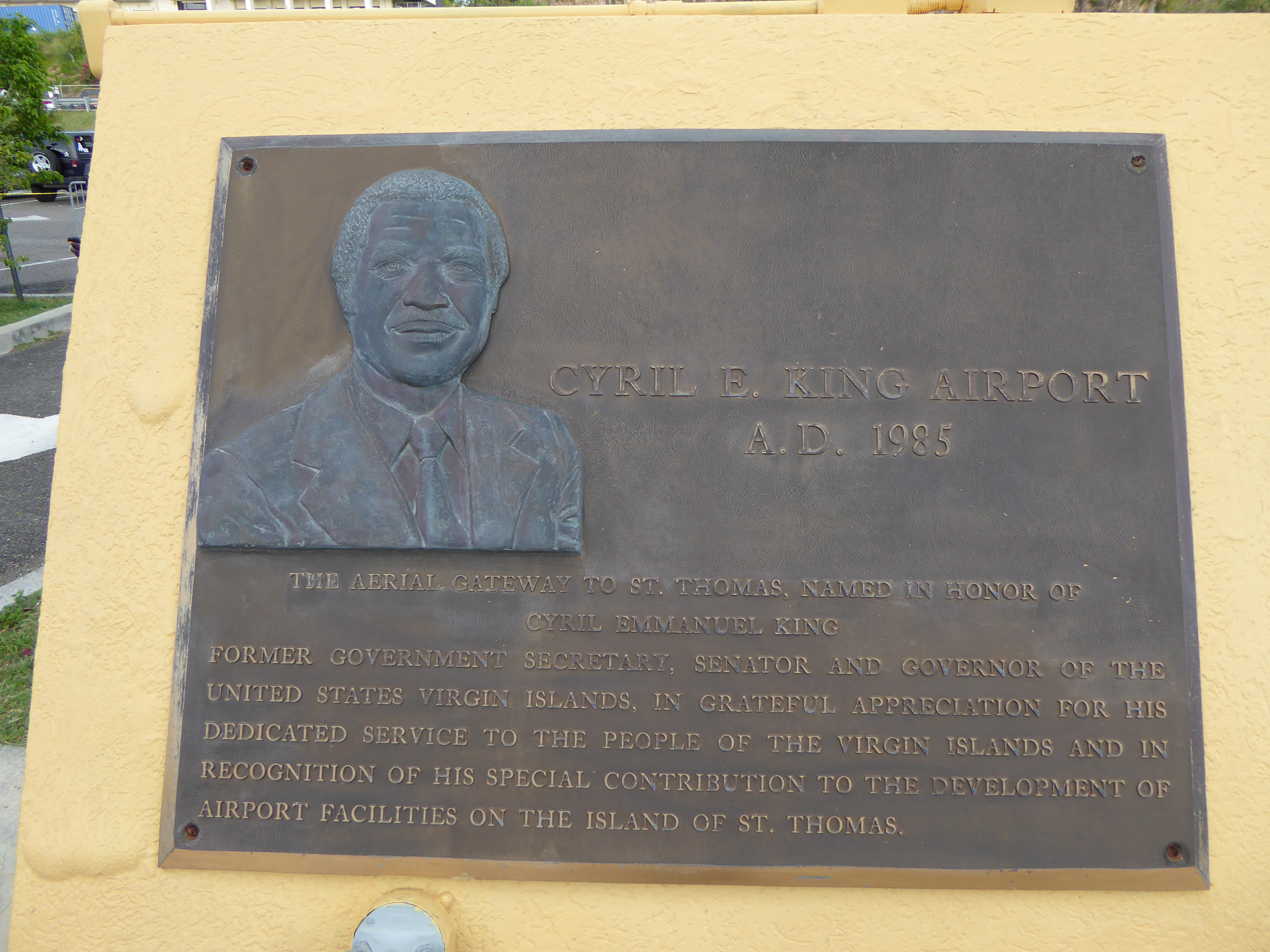
- Plaque commemorating King at the Cyril E. King Airport

2nd Governor of the United States Virgin Islands
- In office January 6, 1975 – January 2, 1978
- Lieutenant: Juan Francisco Luis
- Preceded by: Melvin H. Evans
- Succeeded by: Juan Francisco Luis
- Acting; February 12, 1969 – July 1, 1969
- Preceded by: Ralph Paiewonsky
- Succeeded by: Melvin H. Evans

Personal details
- Born: Cyril Emanuel King; April 7, 1921 Frederiksted, U.S. Virgin Islands
- Died: January 2, 1978 (aged 56) Charlotte Amalie, U.S. Virgin Islands
- Party: Democratic (Before 1968); Independent Citizens Movement (1968–1978)
- Spouse: Agnes Schuster (m. 1946)
- Children: 1 daughter, Lillia
- Education: American University (BA)

Military service
- Allegiance: United States
- Branch/service: United States Army
- Unit: 873rd Port Company
- Battles/wars: World War II

Cyril Emanuel King (April 7, 1921 – January 2, 1978) was an American politician who served as the second elected governor of the United States Virgin Islands from 1975 until his death in 1978.

He also briefly served as acting governor in 1969, following the resignation of Governor Ralph M. Paiewonsky.

== Early life ==
King was born in Frederiksted on the island of Saint Croix, where he lived during his formative years. During World War II, he served in the 873rd Port Company in Hawaii.

After the completion of his service, he attended the American University, where he earned a public administration degree.

== Political career ==
Starting in 1949, King worked for Minnesota senator Hubert Humphrey, as the first black member of staff of the U.S. Senate. He rose through the ranks of the office, eventually becoming chief of staff. He returned to the islands in 1961 as government secretary on the appointment of President John F. Kennedy .

To support his election for governor in 1970 and challenge the Democratic Party in the Virgin Islands, he developed the Independent Citizens Movement. Even though his 1970 campaign was unsuccessful, he ran again in 1974 and won, becoming the second governor of the Virgin Islands. At the time of his death, he had been planning to run for a second term.

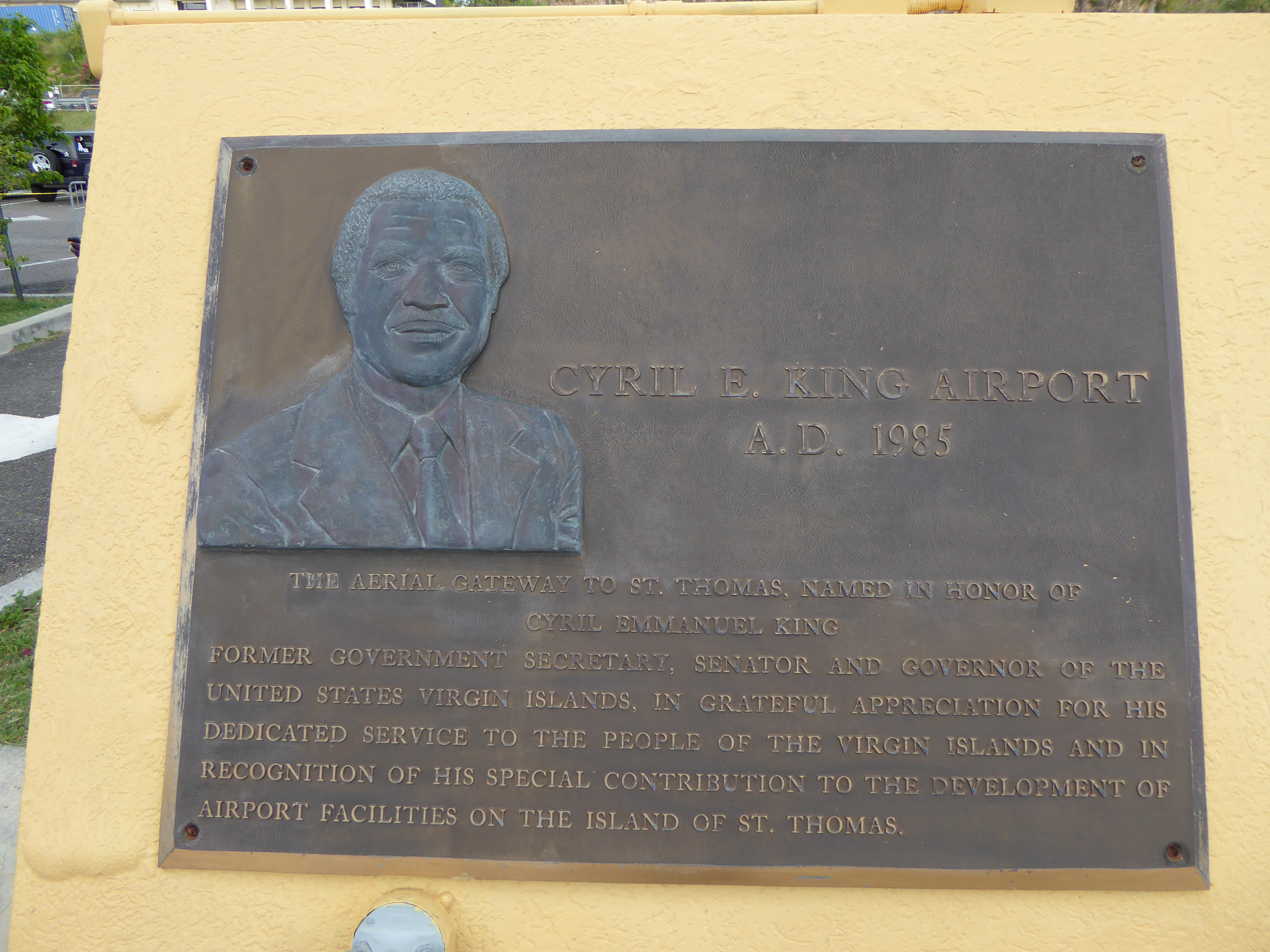
Commemorative plaque at the Cyril E. King Airport

== Death ==
While stateside on official business in 1977, King took ill and decided to return to the territory where he was welcomed by a large crowd of supporters at the airport that now bears his name. He worked from home but never recovered fully, and died on January 2, 1978. It was eventually revealed he suffered from cancer. He was just 56 years old.

== Legacy ==
A Virgin Islands statute puts aside April 7, King's birthday, as Cyril Emmanuel King Day. In 1984, the Harry S. Truman Airport on St. Thomas was renamed Cyril E. King Airport by the Virgin Islands Legislature.

Political offices
Preceded by Ralph Paiewonsky	Governor of the United States Virgin Islands; Acting; 1969	Succeeded by Melvin H. Evans
Preceded by Melvin H. Evans	Governor of the United States Virgin Islands; 1975–1978	Succeeded by Juan Francisco Luis
