= List of governors of the United States Virgin Islands =

Governor of Virgin Islands
- Seal of the U.S. Virgin Islands

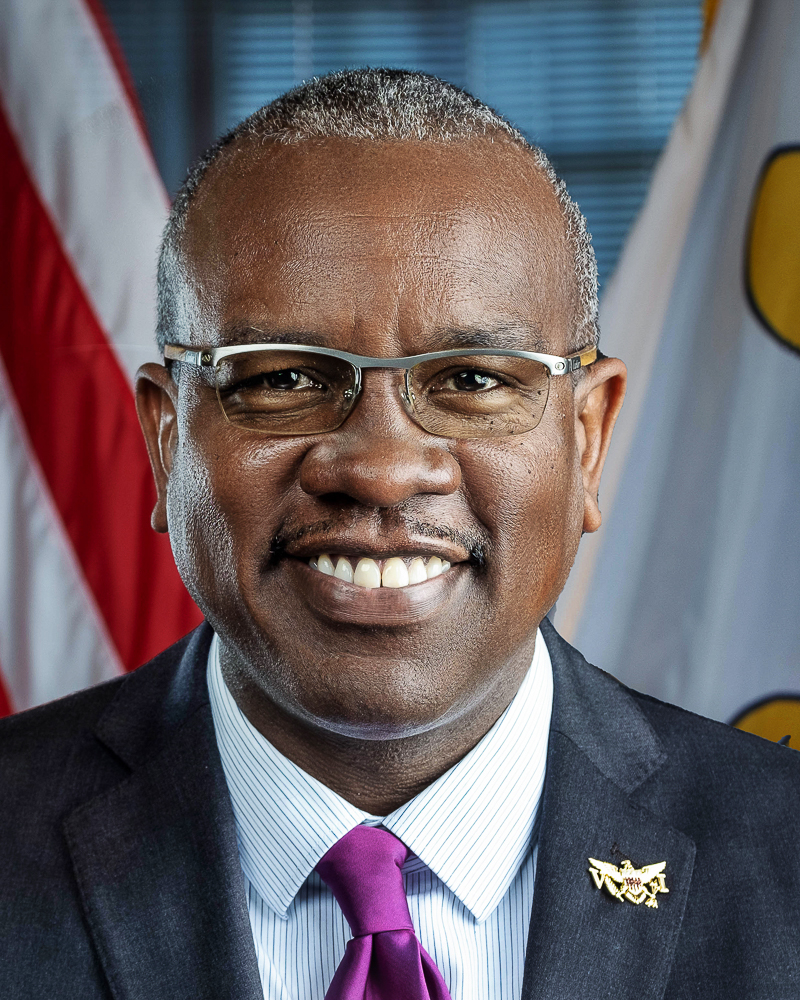
- Incumbent; Albert Bryan since January 7, 2019
- Style: Governor (informal); The Honorable (formal)
- Type: Head of government
- Residence: U.S. Virgin Islands Governor's Mansions
- Term length: Four-year term, renewable once
- Constituting instrument: Revised Organic Act of the Virgin Islands; Elective Governor Acts of 1968
- Formation: 1917 (as Naval Governor); 1931 (as Civilian Governor); 1970 (as elected Governor)
- First holder: Melvin Herbert Evans
- Succession: Line of succession
- Deputy: Lieutenant Governor of the United States Virgin Islands
- Salary: US$192,088 (2025)
- Website: www.vi.gov

The governor of the United States Virgin Islands is the head of government of the United States Virgin Islands whose responsibilities also include making the annual State of the Territory addresses to the Virgin Islands Legislature, submitting the budget, and ensuring that territory public laws are enforced. The position was created through the passage of the Elective Governor Acts of 1968 which took effect in 1970. Melvin Herbert Evans was the first elected governor.

The following is a list of governors of the United States Virgin Islands. For governors of the territory that is now the U.S. Virgin Islands prior to United States administration (while it was ruled by Denmark as the Danish West Indies), see List of governors of the Danish West Indies.

== Appointed governors (1917–1970) ==
=== Naval governors (1917–1931) ===
No.	Portrait	Name (Birth–Death)	Term of office			Appointed by
No.	Portrait	Name (Birth–Death)	Took office	Left office	Time in office	Appointed by
–		Captain; Edwin Taylor Pollock (1870–1943); Acting	March 31, 1917	April 20, 1917	20 days	Woodrow Wilson
1		Rear Admiral; James Harrison Oliver (1857–1928)	April 20, 1917	April 8, 1919	1 year, 353 days	Woodrow Wilson
2		Rear Admiral; Joseph Wallace Oman (1864–1941)	April 8, 1919	April 26, 1921	2 years, 18 days	Woodrow Wilson
3		Rear Admiral; Sumner Ely Wetmore Kittelle (1867–1950)	April 26, 1921	September 16, 1922	1 year, 143 days	Warren G. Harding
4		Captain; Henry Hughes Hough (1871–1943)	September 16, 1922	December 3, 1923	1 year, 78 days	Warren G. Harding
5		Captain; Philip Williams (1869–1942)	December 3, 1923	September 11, 1925	1 year, 282 days	Calvin Coolidge
6		Captain; Martin Edward Trench (1869–1927)	September 12, 1925	January 6, 1927 †	1 year, 116 days	Calvin Coolidge
7		Captain; Waldo A. Evans (1869–1936)	January 19, 1927	March 18, 1931	4 years, 58 days	Calvin Coolidge

=== Civilian governors (1931–1970) ===
No.	Portrait	Name (Birth–Death)	Term of office			Party	Appointed by
No.	Portrait	Name (Birth–Death)	Took office	Left office	Time in office	Party	Appointed by
1		Paul Martin Pearson (1871–1938)	March 18, 1931	July 23, 1935	4 years, 127 days	Republican	Herbert Hoover
–		Robert Herrick (1868–1938); Acting	July 23, 1935	August 21, 1935	29 days	Democratic	Franklin D. Roosevelt
2		Lawrence William Cramer (1897–1978)	August 21, 1935	December 14, 1940	5 years, 115 days	Democratic	Franklin D. Roosevelt
–		Robert Morss Lovett (1870–1956); Acting	December 14, 1940	February 3, 1941	51 days	Democratic	Franklin D. Roosevelt
3		Charles Harwood (1880–1950)	February 3, 1941	May 17, 1946	5 years, 103 days	Democratic	Franklin D. Roosevelt
4		William H. Hastie (1904–1976)	May 17, 1946	October 21, 1949	3 years, 157 days	Democratic	Harry S. Truman
–		Morris Fidanque de Castro (1902–1966)	October 21, 1949	March 4, 1950	134 days	Democratic	Harry S. Truman
5		Morris Fidanque de Castro (1902–1966)	March 4, 1950	April 9, 1954	4 years, 36 days	Democratic	Harry S. Truman
6		Archie Alexander (1888–1958)	April 9, 1954	August 18, 1955	1 year, 131 days	Republican	Dwight D. Eisenhower
–		Charles Kenneth Claunch (1899–1978); Acting	August 18, 1955	October 17, 1955	60 days	Republican	Dwight D. Eisenhower
7		Walter A. Gordon (1894–1976)	October 17, 1955	September 25, 1958	2 years, 343 days	Republican	Dwight D. Eisenhower
8		John David Merwin (1921–2013)	September 25, 1958	April 5, 1961	2 years, 192 days	Republican	Dwight D. Eisenhower
9		Ralph Moses Paiewonsky (1907–1991)	April 5, 1961	February 12, 1969	8 years, 42 days	Democratic	John F. Kennedy
–		Cyril King (1921–1978); Acting	February 12, 1969	July 1, 1969	139 days	Independent Citizens Movement	Richard Nixon
10		Melvin H. Evans (1917–1984)	July 1, 1969	November 1, 1970	1 year, 123 days	Republican	Richard Nixon

== Elected governors (1970–present) ==
Parties

Republican (1) Independent Citizens Movement (1) Democratic (4) Independent (3)

No.	Portrait	Name (Birth–Death)	Term of office			Party	Election
No.	Portrait	Name (Birth–Death)	Took office	Left office	Time in office	Party	Election
1		Melvin H. Evans (1917–1984)	November 1, 1970	January 6, 1975 (lost election)	4 years, 66 days	Republican	1970
2		Cyril King (1921–1978)	January 6, 1975	January 2, 1978 (died in office)	2 years, 361 days	Independent Citizens Movement	1974
3		Juan Francisco Luis (1940–2011)	January 2, 1978	January 5, 1987 (term limited)	9 years, 3 days	Independent Citizens Movement (until 1979)	1978; 1982
3		Juan Francisco Luis (1940–2011)	January 2, 1978	January 5, 1987 (term limited)	9 years, 3 days	Independent (1979 onward)	1978; 1982
4		Alexander Farrelly (1923–2002)	January 5, 1987	January 2, 1995 (term limited)	7 years, 362 days	Democratic	1986; 1990
5		Roy Schneider (1939–2022)	January 2, 1995	January 4, 1999 (lost election)	4 years, 2 days	Independent (Note: Considered a Republican by the National Governor's Association)	1994
6		Charles Wesley Turnbull (1935–2022)	January 4, 1999	January 1, 2007 (term limited)	7 years, 362 days	Democratic	1998; 2002
7		John de Jongh (born 1957)	January 1, 2007	January 5, 2015 (term limited)	8 years, 4 days	Democratic	2006; 2010
8		Kenneth Mapp (born 1955)	January 5, 2015	January 7, 2019 (lost election)	4 years, 2 days	Independent	2014
9		Albert Bryan (born 1968)	January 7, 2019	Incumbent	7 years, 312 days	Democratic	2018; 2022
10		Stacey Plaskett (born 1966)	Governor-elect Takes office on January 4, 2027		−50 days	Democratic	2026

== See also ==
- List of Virgin Islands Legislatures
