= Ron de Lugo =

American politician (1930–2020)

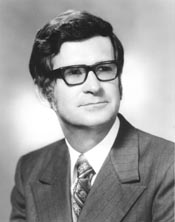

Delegate to the U.S. House of Representatives from the U.S. Virgin Islands' at-large district
- In office January 3, 1981 – January 3, 1995
- Preceded by: Melvin H. Evans
- Succeeded by: Victor O. Frazer
- In office January 3, 1973 – January 3, 1979
- Preceded by: Constituency established
- Succeeded by: Melvin H. Evans

Personal details
- Born: Ronald de Lugo; August 2, 1930 Englewood, New Jersey, U.S.
- Died: July 14, 2020 (aged 89) Miami, Florida, U.S.
- Party: Democratic
- Spouse(s): Maria Morales Viera; Sheila Paiewonsky

Military service
- Allegiance: United States
- Branch/service: United States Army
- Years of service: 1948–1950
- Unit: Armed Forces Radio

Ronald de Lugo (August 2, 1930 – July 14, 2020) was an American politician. He was the first Delegate from the United States Virgin Islands to the United States House of Representatives.

Ron de Lugo's parents were Puerto Ricans. His grandfather owned a hardware store and gun dealership in Charlotte Amalie, St. Thomas. De Lugo's parents were living in New Jersey at the time he was born and also lived in the Virgin Islands as civil servants. He was born in Englewood, New Jersey, and attended the Colegio San José in the Río Piedras district of San Juan, Puerto Rico.

De Lugo served in the United States Army as a program director and announcer for the Armed Forces Radio Service. He worked at WSTA radio in St. Thomas and also at WIVI in St. Croix. He was a Virgin Islands territorial Senator, a Democratic National Committeeman, the administrator for St. Croix, the representative of the Virgin Islands to Washington, D.C., and a delegate to the Democratic National Conventions in 1956, 1960, 1964 and 1968.

After the position of Delegate to the U.S. House of Representatives was created for the Virgin Islands, De Lugo was the first to be elected to the office, in 1972. He served as a Democrat, from January 3, 1973 to January 3, 1979.

De Lugo chose not to seek re-election as Delegate in 1978 so as to pursue a bid for Governor of the U.S. Virgin Islands. He challenged incumbent Governor Juan Francisco Luis in the 1978 gubernatorial election. De Lugo chose Eric E. Dawson, a Senator in the Legislature of the Virgin Islands, as his running mate for lieutenant governor. Luis defeated de Lugo in the general election on November 7, 1978. Luis and Lt. Gov. Henry Millin won 10,978 votes (59.2%); De Lugo and Dawson placed second with 7,568 votes (40.8%). The Luis-Millin ticket won all three of the U.S. Virgin Islands' main islands.

De Lugo was elected Delegate again, serving from January 3, 1981 to January 3, 1995; he did not seek re-election in 1994. During this time in office De Lugo chaired the committed on creating the Northern Marianas into a Commonwealth of The Northern Mariana Islands. After retiring, he was a resident of St. Croix. De Lugo died on July 14, 2020 at an assisted living facility in Miami, Florida, less than a month before his 90th birthday.

== Legacy ==
The Ron de Lugo Federal Building and U.S. Courthouse on St. Thomas is named after him.

== See also ==
- List of Hispanic Americans in the United States Congress

U.S. House of Representatives
New constituency	Delegate to the U.S. House of Representatives from the United States Virgin Islands; 1973–1979	Succeeded by Melvin H. Evans
Preceded by Melvin H. Evans	Delegate to the U.S. House of Representatives from the United States Virgin Islands; 1981–1995	Succeeded by Victor O. Frazer
Party political offices
Preceded by Alexander Farrelly	Democratic nominee for Governor of the United States Virgin Islands; 1978	Succeeded by Henry Millin
