= Independent Citizens Movement =

- Abbreviation: ICM
- Chairperson: Dale Blyden
- Founded: October 14, 1968; 57 years ago
- Split from: Democratic Party of the Virgin Islands
- Ideology: Territorial autonomy Grassroots democracy Reformism
- Colors: Blue; Orange
- Seats in the Legislature of the Virgin Islands: 0 / 15
- U.S. House of Representatives: 0 / 1

The Independent Citizens Movement (or Independent Citizens' Movement) is a political party in the U.S. Virgin Islands that was founded by Virdin C. Brown and Steve O'Reilly in 1968. Its symbol is the torch. The party advocates for grassroots participation in politics, as well as more autonomy for the U.S. Virgin Islands.

== Early history ==
The party had its first political candidates in 1968, and it ran candidates again in 1970. An advertisement in The Virgin Islands Daily News on June 24, 1970 listed Fabian Martinez as the party's president.

The party's mission, according to a speech by Brown in 1969, is to "give the government back to the people through good, responsive, and responsible leadership." The party's platform was published in The Virgin Islands Daily News on October 26, 1974. The platform includes increasing the autonomy of the Virgin Islands and increased control over the territory's internal affairs, while still remaining a part of the United States.

Party member Cyril E. King successfully ran for governor in 1974. King was succeeded as governor in turn by his former ICM lieutenant governor, Juan Francisco Luis, who remained in office until 1987.

== Recent history ==
From 1995 to 1997 Victor O. Frazer was Delegate from the U.S. Virgin Islands as the party's candidate, although he served as an independent in the House. In the United States Virgin Islands general election, 2014, the party won one out of 15 seats.

== Electoral performance (2006–present) ==
Year	Gubernatorial vote	House vote	Legislative seats
2024	No election held	No candidate	0 / 15
2022	3rd (740) 3.4 / 100	No candidate	0 / 15
2020	No election held	No candidate	0 / 15
2018	No candidate	No candidate	0 / 15
2016	No election held	No candidate	1 / 15
2014	No candidate	No candidate	1 / 15
2012	No election held	No candidate	1 / 15
2010	No candidate	No candidate	2 / 15
2008	No candidate	No candidate	2 / 15
2006	No candidate	No candidate	4 / 15
