= List of Virgin Islands Legislatures =

The following is a list of terms of the legislature of the United States Virgin Islands. The legislature operates under the amended Revised Organic Act of the Virgin Islands of 1954.

== Legislatures ==
Name	Start date	End date	Last election
1st Virgin Islands Legislature	1955	1956	
2nd Virgin Islands Legislature	1957	1958	
3rd Virgin Islands Legislature	1959	1960	
4th Virgin Islands Legislature	1961	1962	
5th Virgin Islands Legislature	1963	1964	November 1962 United States Virgin Islands general election
6th Virgin Islands Legislature	1965	1966	November 1964 United States Virgin Islands general election
7th Virgin Islands Legislature	1967	1968	November 1966 United States Virgin Islands general election
8th Virgin Islands Legislature	1969	1970	
9th Virgin Islands Legislature	1971	1972	November 1970 United States Virgin Islands general election
10th Virgin Islands Legislature	1973	1974	
11th Virgin Islands Legislature	1975	1976	November 1974 United States Virgin Islands general election
12th Virgin Islands Legislature	1977	1978	
13th Virgin Islands Legislature	1979	1980	November 1978 United States Virgin Islands general election
14th Virgin Islands Legislature	1981	1982	
15th Virgin Islands Legislature	1983	1984	November 1982 United States Virgin Islands general election
16th Virgin Islands Legislature	1985	1986	
17th Virgin Islands Legislature	1987	1988	November 1986 United States Virgin Islands general election
18th Virgin Islands Legislature	1989	1990	
19th Virgin Islands Legislature	1991	1992	November 1990 United States Virgin Islands general election
20th Virgin Islands Legislature	1993	1994	November 1992 United States Virgin Islands general election
21st Virgin Islands Legislature	1995	1996	November 1994 United States Virgin Islands general election
22nd Virgin Islands Legislature	1997	1998	November 1996 United States Virgin Islands general election
23rd Virgin Islands Legislature	1999	2000	November 1998 United States Virgin Islands general election
24th Virgin Islands Legislature	2001	2002	November 2000 United States Virgin Islands general election
25th Virgin Islands Legislature	2003	2005	November 2002 United States Virgin Islands general election
26th Virgin Islands Legislature	2005	2007	November 2004 United States Virgin Islands general election
27th Virgin Islands Legislature	2007	2009	November 2006 United States Virgin Islands general election
28th Virgin Islands Legislature	January 12, 2009	2011	November 2008 United States Virgin Islands general election
29th Virgin Islands Legislature	2011	2013	November 2010 United States Virgin Islands general election
30th Virgin Islands Legislature	2013	2015	November 2012 United States Virgin Islands general election
31st Virgin Islands Legislature	January 12, 2015	January 9, 2017	November 2014 United States Virgin Islands general election
32nd Virgin Islands Legislature	2017	January 14, 2019	November 2016 United States Virgin Islands general election
33rd Virgin Islands Legislature	January 14, 2019	2020	November 2018 United States Virgin Islands general election
34th Virgin Islands Legislature	2021	2023	November 2020 United States Virgin Islands general election
35th Virgin Islands Legislature	January 9, 2023	2024	November 2022 United States Virgin Islands general election
36th Virgin Islands Legislature	2025		November 2024 United States Virgin Islands general election

== See also ==
- List of presidents of the Virgin Islands Legislature
- List of governors of the United States Virgin Islands
- Lists of United States state legislative sessions
