= Political party strength in the United States Virgin Islands =

The following table indicates the party of elected officials in the United States insular area of the United States Virgin Islands:

- Governor
- Lieutenant Governor

The table also indicates the historical party composition in the:

- Territorial Legislature
- Territory delegation to the U.S. House of Representatives

The parties are as follows: Democratic (D), Independent (I), Independent Citizens Movement (IC), and Republican (R).

For a particular year, the noted partisan composition is that which either took office during that year or which maintained the office throughout the entire year. Only changes made outside of regularly scheduled elections are noted as affecting the partisan composition during a particular year. Shading is determined by the final result of any mid-cycle changes in partisan affiliation.

Year	Executive offices		Territorial Legislature	Legislature President	U.S. House
Year	Governor	Lieutenant Governor	Territorial Legislature	Legislature President	U.S. House
1917	E. T. Pollock	no such office	[data missing]	[data missing]	no such office
1917	James Harrison Oliver	no such office	[data missing]	[data missing]	no such office
1918	James Harrison Oliver	no such office	[data missing]	[data missing]	no such office
1919	Joseph Wallace Oman	no such office	[data missing]	[data missing]	no such office
1920	Joseph Wallace Oman	no such office	[data missing]	[data missing]	no such office
1921	Joseph Wallace Oman	no such office	[data missing]	[data missing]	no such office
1921	Sumner Ely Wetmore Kittelle	no such office	[data missing]	[data missing]	no such office
1922	Sumner Ely Wetmore Kittelle	no such office	[data missing]	[data missing]	no such office
1922	Henry Hughes Hough	no such office	[data missing]	[data missing]	no such office
1923	Henry Hughes Hough	no such office	[data missing]	[data missing]	no such office
1923	Philip Williams	no such office	[data missing]	[data missing]	no such office
1924	Philip Williams	no such office	[data missing]	[data missing]	no such office
1925	Philip Williams	no such office	[data missing]	[data missing]	no such office
1925	Martin Edward Trench	no such office	[data missing]	[data missing]	no such office
1926	Martin Edward Trench	no such office	[data missing]	[data missing]	no such office
1927	Martin Edward Trench	no such office	[data missing]	[data missing]	no such office
1927	Waldo A. Evans	no such office	[data missing]	[data missing]	no such office
1928	Waldo A. Evans	no such office	[data missing]	[data missing]	no such office
1929	Waldo A. Evans	no such office	[data missing]	[data missing]	no such office
1930	Waldo A. Evans	no such office	[data missing]	[data missing]	no such office
1931	Waldo A. Evans	no such office	[data missing]	[data missing]	no such office
1931	Paul Martin Pearson	no such office	[data missing]	[data missing]	no such office
1932	Paul Martin Pearson	no such office	[data missing]	[data missing]	no such office
1933	Paul Martin Pearson	no such office	[data missing]	[data missing]	no such office
1934	Paul Martin Pearson	no such office	[data missing]	[data missing]	no such office
1935	Paul Martin Pearson	no such office	[data missing]	[data missing]	no such office
1935	Robert Herrick	no such office	[data missing]	[data missing]	no such office
1935	Lawrence William Cramer	no such office	[data missing]	[data missing]	no such office
1936	Lawrence William Cramer	no such office	[data missing]	[data missing]	no such office
1937	Lawrence William Cramer	no such office	[data missing]	[data missing]	no such office
1938	Lawrence William Cramer	no such office	[data missing]	[data missing]	no such office
1939	Lawrence William Cramer	no such office	[data missing]	[data missing]	no such office
1940	Lawrence William Cramer	no such office	[data missing]	[data missing]	no such office
1940	Robert Morss Lovett	no such office	[data missing]	[data missing]	no such office
1941	Robert Morss Lovett	no such office	[data missing]	[data missing]	no such office
1941	Charles Harwood	no such office	[data missing]	[data missing]	no such office
1942	Charles Harwood	no such office	[data missing]	[data missing]	no such office
1943	Charles Harwood	no such office	[data missing]	[data missing]	no such office
1944	Charles Harwood	no such office	[data missing]	[data missing]	no such office
1945	Charles Harwood	no such office	[data missing]	[data missing]	no such office
1946	William H. Hastie	no such office	[data missing]	[data missing]	no such office
1947	William H. Hastie	no such office	[data missing]	[data missing]	no such office
1948	William H. Hastie	no such office	[data missing]	[data missing]	no such office
1949	William H. Hastie	no such office	[data missing]	[data missing]	no such office
1949	Morris Fidanque de Castro	no such office	[data missing]	[data missing]	no such office
1950	Morris Fidanque de Castro	no such office	[data missing]	[data missing]	no such office
1951	Morris Fidanque de Castro	no such office	[data missing]	[data missing]	no such office
1952	Morris Fidanque de Castro	no such office	[data missing]	[data missing]	no such office
1953	Morris Fidanque de Castro	no such office	[data missing]	[data missing]	no such office
1954	Morris Fidanque de Castro	no such office	[data missing]	[data missing]	no such office
1954	Archie Alexander	no such office	[data missing]	[data missing]	no such office
1955	Archie Alexander	no such office	[data missing]	[data missing]	no such office
1955	Charles Kenneth Claunch	no such office	[data missing]	[data missing]	no such office
1955	Walter A. Gordon	no such office	[data missing]	[data missing]	no such office
1956	Walter A. Gordon	no such office	[data missing]	[data missing]	no such office
1957	Walter A. Gordon	no such office	[data missing]	[data missing]	no such office
1958	Walter A. Gordon	no such office	[data missing]	[data missing]	no such office
1958	John David Merwin	no such office	[data missing]	[data missing]	no such office
1959	John David Merwin	no such office	[data missing]	[data missing]	no such office
1960	John David Merwin	no such office	[data missing]	[data missing]	no such office
1961	John David Merwin	no such office	[data missing]	[data missing]	no such office
1961	Ralph Moses Paiewonsky	no such office	[data missing]	[data missing]	no such office
1962	Ralph Moses Paiewonsky	no such office	[data missing]	[data missing]	no such office
1963	Ralph Moses Paiewonsky	no such office	[data missing]	[data missing]	no such office
1964	Ralph Moses Paiewonsky	no such office	[data missing]	[data missing]	no such office
1965	Ralph Moses Paiewonsky	no such office	[data missing]	[data missing]	no such office
1966	Ralph Moses Paiewonsky	no such office	[data missing]	[data missing]	no such office
1967	Ralph Moses Paiewonsky	no such office	[data missing]	[data missing]	no such office
1968	Ralph Moses Paiewonsky	no such office	[data missing]	[data missing]	no such office
1969	Ralph Moses Paiewonsky	no such office	15D	John L. Maduro (D)	Ron de Lugo (D) (Washington Representative)
1969	Cyril King	no such office	15D	John L. Maduro (D)	Ron de Lugo (D) (Washington Representative)
1969	Melvin H. Evans (R)	David Earle Maas (R)	15D	John L. Maduro (D)	Ron de Lugo (D) (Washington Representative)
1970	Melvin H. Evans (R)	David Earle Maas (R)	15D	John L. Maduro (D)	Ron de Lugo (D) (Washington Representative)
1971	Melvin H. Evans (R)	David Earle Maas (R)	6D, 6IC, 3R	John L. Maduro (D)	Ron de Lugo (D) (Washington Representative)
1972	Melvin H. Evans (R)	David Earle Maas (R)	6D, 6IC, 3R	John L. Maduro (D)	Ron de Lugo (D) (Washington Representative)
1973	Melvin H. Evans (R)	vacant	7IC, 7D, 1R	Claude Molloy (IC)	Ron de Lugo (D)
1974	Melvin H. Evans (R)	Athniel C. Ottley (D)	7IC, 7D, 1R	Claude Molloy (IC)	Ron de Lugo (D)
1975	Cyril King (IC)	Juan Francisco Luis (IC)	11D, 3IC, 1R	Elmo D. Roebuck (D)	Ron de Lugo (D)
1976	Cyril King (IC)	Juan Francisco Luis (IC)	11D, 3IC, 1R	Elmo D. Roebuck (D)	Ron de Lugo (D)
1977	Cyril King (IC)	Juan Francisco Luis (IC)	13D, 1IC, 1R	Elmo D. Roebuck (D)	Ron de Lugo (D)
1978	Cyril King (IC)	Henry Millin (D)	13D, 1IC, 1R	Elmo D. Roebuck (D)	Ron de Lugo (D)
1979	Juan Francisco Luis (IC)	Henry Millin (D)	12D, 3I	Elmo D. Roebuck (D)	Melvin H. Evans (R)
1980	Juan Francisco Luis (IC)	Henry Millin (D)	12D, 3I	Elmo D. Roebuck (D)	Melvin H. Evans (R)
1981	Juan Francisco Luis (IC)	Henry Millin (D)	[data missing]	Ruby Rouss (D)	Ron de Lugo (D)
1982	Juan Francisco Luis (IC)	Henry Millin (D)	[data missing]	Ruby Rouss (D)	Ron de Lugo (D)
1983	Juan Francisco Luis (IC)	Julio Brady (D)	8D, 6I, 1IC	Elmo D. Roebuck (D)	Ron de Lugo (D)
1984	Juan Francisco Luis (IC)	Julio Brady (D)	8D, 6I, 1IC	Hugo Dennis Jr (D)	Ron de Lugo (D)
1985	Juan Francisco Luis (IC)	Julio Brady (D)	8D, 5I, 1IC, 1R	Derek Hodge (D)	Ron de Lugo (D)
1986	Juan Francisco Luis (IC)	Julio Brady (D)	8D, 5I, 1IC, 1R	Derek Hodge (D)	Ron de Lugo (D)
1987	Alexander Farrelly (D)	Derek Hodge (D)	7D, 6I, 1IC, 1R	Ruby Rouss (D)	Ron de Lugo (D)
1988	Alexander Farrelly (D)	Derek Hodge (D)	7D, 6I, 1IC, 1R	Iver Stridiron (D)	Ron de Lugo (D)
1989	Alexander Farrelly (D)	Derek Hodge (D)	[data missing]	Bent Lawaetz	Ron de Lugo (D)
1990	Alexander Farrelly (D)	Derek Hodge (D)	[data missing]	Bent Lawaetz	Ron de Lugo (D)
1991	Alexander Farrelly (D)	Derek Hodge (D)	[data missing]	Virdin Brown	Ron de Lugo (D)
1992	Alexander Farrelly (D)	Derek Hodge (D)	[data missing]	Virdin Brown	Ron de Lugo (D)
1993	Alexander Farrelly (D)	Derek Hodge (D)	[data missing]	Bingley Richardson	Ron de Lugo (D)
1994	Alexander Farrelly (D)	Derek Hodge (D)	[data missing]	Bingley Richardson	Ron de Lugo (D)
1995	Roy Schneider (R)	Kenneth Mapp (R)	[data missing]	Almando Liburd	Victor O. Frazer (IC)
1996	Roy Schneider (R)	Kenneth Mapp (R)	[data missing]	Almando Liburd	Victor O. Frazer (IC)
1997	Roy Schneider (R)	Kenneth Mapp (R)	[data missing]	Lorraine Berry	Donna Christensen (D)
1998	Roy Schneider (R)	Kenneth Mapp (R)	[data missing]	Lorraine Berry	Donna Christensen (D)
1999	Charles Wesley Turnbull (D)	Gerard Luz James (D)	[data missing]	Vargrave Richards	Donna Christensen (D)
2000	Charles Wesley Turnbull (D)	Gerard Luz James (D)	[data missing]	Vargrave Richards	Donna Christensen (D)
2001	Charles Wesley Turnbull (D)	Gerard Luz James (D)	[data missing]	Almando Liburd	Donna Christensen (D)
2002	Charles Wesley Turnbull (D)	Gerard Luz James (D)	[data missing]	Almando Liburd	Donna Christensen (D)
2003	Charles Wesley Turnbull (D)	Vargrave Richards (D)	[data missing]	David S. Jones	Donna Christensen (D)
2004	Charles Wesley Turnbull (D)	Vargrave Richards (D)	[data missing]	David S. Jones	Donna Christensen (D)
2005	Charles Wesley Turnbull (D)	Vargrave Richards (D)	[data missing]	Lorraine Berry	Donna Christensen (D)
2006	Charles Wesley Turnbull (D)	Vargrave Richards (D)	[data missing]	Lorraine Berry	Donna Christensen (D)
2007	John de Jongh Jr. (D)	Gregory Francis (D)	9D, 4IC, 2I	Usie Richards (D)	Donna Christensen (D)
2008	John de Jongh Jr. (D)	Gregory Francis (D)	9D, 4IC, 2I	Usie Richards (D)	Donna Christensen (D)
2009	John de Jongh Jr. (D)	Gregory Francis (D)	10D, 3I, 2IC	Adlah Donastorg (D)	Donna Christensen (D)
2010	John de Jongh Jr. (D)	Gregory Francis (D)	10D, 3I, 2IC	Louis Patrick Hill (D)	Donna Christensen (D)
2011	John de Jongh Jr. (D)	Gregory Francis (D)	10D, 3I, 2IC	Ronald E. Russell (D)	Donna Christensen (D)
2012	John de Jongh Jr. (D)	Gregory Francis (D)	10D, 3I, 2IC	Ronald E. Russell (D)	Donna Christensen (D)
2013	John de Jongh Jr. (D)	Gregory Francis (D)	10D, 4I, 1IC	Shawn-Michael Malone (D)	Donna Christensen (D)
2014	John de Jongh Jr. (D)	Gregory Francis (D)	10D, 4I, 1IC	Shawn-Michael Malone (D)	Donna Christensen (D)
2015	Kenneth Mapp (I)	Osbert Potter (I)	11D, 3I, 1IC	Neville James (D)	Stacey Plaskett (D)
2016	Kenneth Mapp (I)	Osbert Potter (I)	11D, 3I, 1IC	Neville James (D)	Stacey Plaskett (D)
2017	Kenneth Mapp (I)	Osbert Potter (I)	11D, 3I, 1IC	Myron D. Jackson (D)	Stacey Plaskett (D)
2018	Kenneth Mapp (I)	Osbert Potter (I)	11D, 3I, 1IC	Myron D. Jackson (D)	Stacey Plaskett (D)
2019	Albert Bryan (D)	Tregenza Roach (D)	13D, 2I	Kenneth Gittens (D)	Stacey Plaskett (D)
2020	Albert Bryan (D)	Tregenza Roach (D)	13D, 2I	Novelle Francis (D)	Stacey Plaskett (D)
2021	Albert Bryan (D)	Tregenza Roach (D)	10D, 5I	Donna Frett-Gregory (D)	Stacey Plaskett (D)
2022	Albert Bryan (D)	Tregenza Roach (D)	10D, 5I	Donna Frett-Gregory (D)	Stacey Plaskett (D)
2023	Albert Bryan (D)	Tregenza Roach (D)	11D, 4I	Novelle Francis (D)	Stacey Plaskett (D)
2024	Albert Bryan (D)	Tregenza Roach (D)	11D, 4I	Novelle Francis (D)	Stacey Plaskett (D)
2025	Albert Bryan (D)	Tregenza Roach (D)	12D, 3I	Milton E. Potter (D)	Stacey Plaskett (D)
2026	Albert Bryan (D)	Tregenza Roach (D)	12D, 3I	Milton E. Potter (D)	Stacey Plaskett (D)

== See also ==
- Politics of the United States Virgin Islands
- Elections in the United States Virgin Islands
- List of political parties in the United States Virgin Islands
