= United States Virgin Islands' at-large congressional district =

At-large U.S. House district for the United States Virgin Islands

U.S. Virgin Islands' at-large congressional district
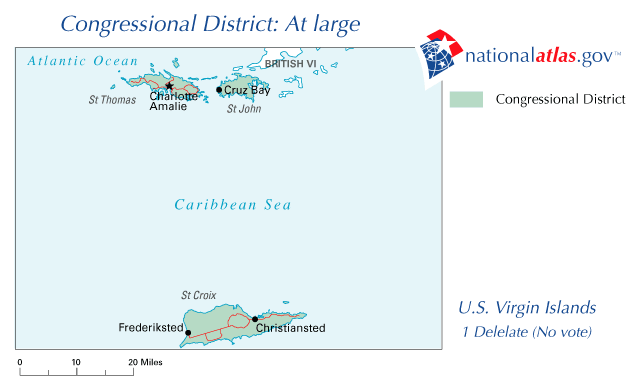
- United States Virgin Islands' at-large congressional district
- Delegate: Stacey Plaskett; D–St. Croix
- Area: 133.7 mi^{2} (346 km^{2})
- Population (2020): 87,146
- Median household income: 21,740
- Ethnicity: 76.2% Black; 13.1% White; 7.8% Hispanic; 1.1% Asian; 0.4% Native American; 0.2% other

The United States Virgin Islands' at-large congressional district encompasses the entire area of the U.S. Virgin Islands. The territory does not have a voting member of Congress, but does elect a delegate who can participate in debates.

Since the Virgin Islands first held a delegate election in 1972, the voters of the territory have elected a Democrat on 23 occasions, a Republican once and an independent once. In total, three Democrats, one Republican and one Independent (who caucused with Democrats) have represented the Virgin Islands in the U.S. Congress.

The current delegate is Democrat Stacey Plaskett.

== List of delegates representing the district ==
Delegate	Party	Years	Cong ress	Electoral history
District established January 3, 1973
Ron de Lugo (St. Croix)	Democratic	January 3, 1973 – January 3, 1979	93rd 94th 95th	Elected in 1972. Re-elected in 1974. Re-elected in 1976. Retired to run for Governor.
Melvin H. Evans (St. Croix)	Republican	January 3, 1979 – January 3, 1981	96th	Elected in 1978. Lost re-election.
Ron de Lugo (St. Croix)	Democratic	January 3, 1981 – January 3, 1995	97th 98th 99th 100th 101st 102nd 103rd	Elected in 1980. Re-elected in 1982. Re-elected in 1984. Re-elected in 1986. Re-elected in 1988. Re-elected in 1990. Re-elected in 1992. Retired.
Victor O. Frazer (St. Thomas)	Independent	January 3, 1995 – January 3, 1997	104th	Elected in 1994. Lost re-election.
Donna Christian-Christensen (St. Croix)	Democratic	January 3, 1997 – January 3, 2015	105th 106th 107th 108th 109th 110th 111th 112th 113th	Elected in 1996. Re-elected in 1998. Re-elected in 2000. Re-elected in 2002. Re-elected in 2004. Re-elected in 2006. Re-elected in 2008. Re-elected in 2010. Re-elected in 2012. Retired to run for Governor.
Stacey Plaskett (St. Croix)	Democratic	January 3, 2015 – present	114th 115th 116th 117th 118th 119th	Elected in 2014. Re-elected in 2016. Re-elected in 2018. Re-elected in 2020. Re-elected in 2022. Re-elected in 2024. Retiring to run for Governor.
Janelle Sarauw (St. Thomas)	Democratic	Assuming office on January 3, 2027		Elected in 2026.

== Election results ==
US House election, 1972: U.S. Virgin Islands at-large district
Party	Candidate	Votes	%	±%
Democratic	Ron de Lugo	10,570	72.6%	
Republican	Victor Schneider	3,987	27.4%	
Majority		6,583	45.2%	
Turnout		14,557	100.0%	

US House election, 1974: U.S. Virgin Islands at-large district
Party	Candidate	Votes	%	±%
Democratic	Ron de Lugo (incumbent)	14,467	100.0%	
Majority		14,467	100.0%	
Turnout		14,467	100.0%	

US House election, 1976: U.S. Virgin Islands at-large district
Party	Candidate	Votes	%	±%
Democratic	Ron de Lugo (incumbent)	12,262	70.6%	
Independent Citizens Movement	Alexander A. Moorhead Jr.	5,111	29.4%	
Majority		7,151	41.2%	
Turnout		17,373	100.0%	

US House election, 1978: U.S. Virgin Islands at-large district
Party	Candidate	Votes	%	±%
Republican	Melvin H. Evans	10,539	52.1%	
Democratic	Janet B. Watlington	9,574	47.4%	
Write-in		98	0.5%	
Majority		965	4.7%	
Turnout		20,211	100.0%	
Republican gain from Democratic				

US House election, 1980: U.S. Virgin Islands at-large district
Party	Candidate	Votes	%	±%
Democratic	Ron de Lugo	10,027	53.0%	
Republican	Melvin H. Evans (Incumbent)	8,876	47.0%	
Majority		1,151	6.0%	
Turnout		18,903	100.0%	
Democratic gain from Republican				

US House election, 1982: U.S. Virgin Islands at-large district
Party	Candidate	Votes	%	±%
Democratic	Ron de Lugo (incumbent)	17,828	82.8%	
Republican	Frank R. Prince	3,142	14.6%	
Independent	Eric A. Smalls	568	2.6%	
Majority		14,686	68.2%	
Turnout		21,538	100.0%	

US House election, 1984: U.S. Virgin Islands at-large district
Party	Candidate	Votes	%	±%
Democratic	Ron de Lugo (incumbent)	15,003	73.5%	
Independent	Janet Watlington	5,211	26.5%	
Majority		9,792	47.0%	
Turnout		20,399	100.0%	

US House election, 1986: U.S. Virgin Islands at-large district
Party	Candidate	Votes	%	±%
Democratic	Ron de Lugo (incumbent)	21,767	94.3%	
Write-in		1,307	5.7%	
Majority		20,460	88.6%	
Turnout		23,074	100.0%	

US House election, 1988: U.S. Virgin Islands at-large district
Party	Candidate	Votes	%	±%
Democratic	Ron de Lugo (incumbent)	14,573	97.4%	
Write-in		395	2.6%	
Majority		14,178	94.8%	
Turnout		14,968	100.0%	

US House election, 1990: U.S. Virgin Islands at-large district
Party	Candidate	Votes	%	±%
Democratic	Ron de Lugo (incumbent)	17,205	98.6%	
Independent	Other	248	1.4%	
Majority		16,957	97.2%	
Turnout		17,453	100.0%	

US House election, 1992: U.S. Virgin Islands at-large district
Party	Candidate	Votes	%	±%
Democratic	Ron de Lugo (incumbent)	14,084	61.2%	
Independent	Victor O. Frazer	8,913	38.8%	
Majority		5,171	22.4%	
Turnout		22,997	100.0%	

US House election, 1994: U.S. Virgin Islands at-large district
Party	Candidate	Votes	%	±%
Democratic	Eileen R. Petersen	10,819	34.1%	
Independent	Victor O. Frazer	10,321	32.5%	
Republican	Edgar De'Lisle Ross	5,513	17.6%	
Independent	Michael A. Paiewonsky	5,069	16.0%	
Write-in		36	0.1%	
Majority		498	1.6%	
Turnout		31,758	100.0%	
Runoff election
Independent	Victor O. Frazer	16,561	54.5%	
Democratic	Eileen R. Petersen	13,817	45.5%	
Majority		2,744	9.0%	
Total votes		30,378	100.00%	
Independent gain from Democratic				

US House election, 1996: U.S. Virgin Islands at-large district
Party	Candidate	Votes	%	±%
Democratic	Donna Christian-Green	11,749	38.61%	
Independent	Victor O. Frazer (Incumbent)	10,315	33.90%	
Republican	Kenneth Mapp	8,316	27.33%	
Write-in		48	0.16%	
Majority		1,434	4.71%	
Turnout		30,428	100.0%	
Runoff election
Democratic	Donna Christian-Green	12,869	51.9%	
Independent	Victor O. Frazer (Incumbent)	11,913	48.1%	
Majority		956	3.8%	
Total votes		24,782	100.00%	
Democratic gain from Independent				

US House election, 1998: U.S. Virgin Islands at-large district
Party	Candidate	Votes	%	±%
Democratic	Donna Christian-Green (incumbent)	24,227	80.1%	
Independent	Victor O. Frazer	5,983	19.8%	
Write-in		20	0.1%	
Majority		18,244	60.3%	
Turnout		30,230	100.0%	

US House election, 2000: U.S. Virgin Islands at-large district
Party	Candidate	Votes	%	±%
Democratic	Donna Christian-Christensen (incumbent)	19,021	78.45%	
Independent	Victor O. Frazer	3,569	14.72%	
Independent Citizens Movement	Jorge J. Estemac	1,626	6.71%	
Write-in		29	0.12%	
Majority		15,452	63.73%	
Turnout		24,245	100.0%	

US House election, 2002: U.S. Virgin Islands at-large district
Party	Candidate	Votes	%	±%
Democratic	Donna Christian-Christensen (incumbent)	20,414	67.7%	
Independent Citizens Movement	Virdin C. Brown	4,456	14.8%	
Republican	Lilliana Belardo de O’Neal	4,286	14.2%	
Independent	Garry A. Sprauve	996	3.3%	
Write-in		12	0.01	
Majority		15,958	52.9%	
Turnout		30,165	100.0%	

US House election, 2004: U.S. Virgin Islands at-large district
Party	Candidate	Votes	%	±%
Democratic	Donna Christian-Christensen (incumbent)	17,379	65.7%	
Independent	Warren Mosler	7,522	28.5%	
Republican	Krim Ballantine	1,512	5.7%	
Write-in		18	0.01	
Majority		9,857	37.2%	
Turnout		26,431	100.0%	

US House election, 2006: U.S. Virgin Islands at-large district
Party	Candidate	Votes	%	±%
Democratic	Donna Christian-Christensen (incumbent)	18,322	62.91	
Independent	Warren Mosler	10,800	37.08	
Write-in		4	0.01	
Majority		7,522	25.83	
Turnout		29,126		

US House election, 2008: U.S. Virgin Islands at-large district
Party	Candidate	Votes	%	±%
Democratic	'Donna Christian-Christensen (incumbent)'	19,286	99.64%	
Write-in		69	0.36%	
Majority		19,217		
Turnout		19,355	100%	

US House election, 2010: U.S. Virgin Islands at-large district
Party	Candidate	Votes	%	±%
Democratic	Donna Christian-Christensen (incumbent)	19,844	71.73%	
Independent	Jeffrey Moorhead	5,063	18.30%	
Republican	Vincent Emile Danet	2,329	8.42%	
Independent	Guillaume Mimoun	419	1.51	
Write-in		11	0.04%	
Turnout		27,666	100%	

US House election, 2012: U.S. Virgin Islands at-large district
Party	Candidate	Votes	%	±%
Democratic	Donna Christian-Christensen (incumbent)	13,273	56.61%	
Independent	Warren Mosler	3,968	16.92%	
Independent	Norma Pickard-Samuel	3,386	14.44%	
Republican	Holland L Redfield, II	2,409	10.28%	
Independent	Guillaume Mimoum	375	1.60%	
Write-in		34	0.15%	
Turnout		23,445	100%	

US House election, 2014: U.S. Virgin Islands at-large district
Party	Candidate	Votes	%	±%
Democratic	Stacey Plaskett	21,224	90.65%	
Republican	Vince Danet	1,964	8.39%	
Write-in		224	0.96%	
Turnout		23,412	100%	

US House election, 2016: U.S. Virgin Islands at-large district
Party	Candidate	Votes	%	±%
Democratic	Stacey Plaskett (incumbent)	14,531	97.51%	+6.86%
Write-in		371	2.49%	+1.53%
Total votes		14,902	100.0%	N/A
Democratic hold				

US House election, 2018: U.S. Virgin Islands at-large district
Party	Candidate	Votes	%	±%
Democratic	Stacey Plaskett (incumbent)	16,341	98.41%	+0.90%
Write-in		264	1.59%	-0.90%
Total votes		16,605	100%	N/A
Democratic hold				

US House election, 2020: U.S. Virgin Islands at-large district
Party	Candidate	Votes	%	±%
Democratic	Stacey Plaskett (incumbent)	13,620	87.94	
Independent	Shekema George	1,782	11.51	
Write-in		85	0.55	
Total votes		15,487	100	N/A

US House election, 2022: U.S. Virgin Islands at-large district
Party	Candidate	Votes	%	±%
Democratic	Stacey Plaskett (incumbent)	16,354	98.74%	
Write-in		209	1.26%	
Total votes		16,563	100	N/A

US House election, 2024: U.S. Virgin Islands at-large district
Party	Candidate	Votes	%	±%
Democratic	Stacey Plaskett (incumbent)	10,397	73.39%	
Independent	Ida Smith	2,323	16.40%	
Republican	Ronald Pickard	1,348	9.52%	
Write-in		99	0.70%	
Turnout		14,167	100%	
