= 1984 United States Virgin Islands general election =

General elections were held in the United States Virgin Islands on 6 November 1984, to elect 15 members of the Legislature of the Virgin Islands and the Delegate to United States House of Representatives.

== Results ==
=== Territorial Legislature ===
Party	Constituency			At-large			Total seats
Party	Votes	%	Seats	Votes	%	Seats	Total seats
Democratic Party	53,676	47.28	7	8,346	61.21	1	8
Independent Citizens Movement	6,390	5.63	1				1
Republican Party	9,023	7.95	1				1
Independents	44,435	39.14	5	5,289	38.79	0	5
Total	113,524	100.00	14	13,635	100.00	1	15
Source: Government of the Virgin Islands

==== By constituency ====
Senator at large
Candidate	Party	Votes	%
Cleone Creque Maynard	Democratic Party	8,346	61.21
Vincen M. Clendinen	Independent	2,743	20.12
Alvin L. Newton	Independent	2,546	18.67
Total		13,635	100.00
Source: Government of the Virgin Islands

St. Thomas/St. John
Candidate	Party	Votes	%
Virdin C. Brown	Independent Citizens Movement	6,029	9.74
Eric E. Dawson	Democratic Party	5,629	9.10
Clement "Cain" Magras	Independent	5,338	8.63
Lorraine Berry	Democratic Party	5,075	8.20
Allan Paul Shatkin	Democratic Party	4,744	7.67
Iver A. Stridiron	Democratic Party	4,626	7.48
James A. O'Bryan Jr.	Independent	4,244	6.86
Ruby Simmonds	Independent	4,073	6.58
Gaylord A. Sprauve	Democratic Party	3,560	5.75
Bingley C. Richardson Sr.	Independent	3,534	5.71
George B. Goodwin	Democratic Party	3,323	5.37
Milton A. Frett	Independent	2,992	4.84
Arthur S. Hodge Sr.	Independent	2,908	4.70
Hugo Dennis Jr.	Democratic Party	2,770	4.48
Hernando Ike Williams	Republican Party	890	1.44
Harry A. Daniel	Independent	632	1.02
Wayne Adams	Independent	624	1.01
Flavius A. Ottley	Independent	608	0.98
Omodase Amin Muhammad	Independent	270	0.44
Total		61,869	100.00
Source: Government of the Virgin Islands

St. Croix
Candidate	Party	Votes	%
Derek M. Hodge	Democratic Party	5,620	10.88
Ruby M. Rouss	Democratic Party	4,563	8.83
Adelbert Bryan	Democratic Party	4,273	8.27
Holland L. Redfield II	Republican Party	4,156	8.05
Lilliana Belardo de O'Neal	Independent	4,035	7.81
John A. Bell	Independent	3,599	6.97
Hector L. Cintron	Independent	3,580	6.93
Bent Lawaetz	Democratic Party	3,164	6.13
Kenneth Mapp	Independent	3,007	5.82
Edgar M. Iles	Democratic Party	2,976	5.76
William S. Harvey	Democratic Party	2,550	4.94
Lydia B. Gordon	Republican Party	1,909	3.70
Raymond "Usie" Richards	Independent	1,514	2.93
Edric W. Stanley	Republican Party	1,434	2.78
Claude "Tappy" Molloy	Independent	1,405	2.72
Frank Elmo Jacobs Jr.	Democratic Party	803	1.55
Reginald A. George	Republican Party	634	1.23
Idealfonso Encarnacion	Independent	562	1.09
George C. O'Reilly	Independent	424	0.82
Glen "Butcher" Brown	Independent	413	0.80
Jorge Este-McDonald	Independent Citizens Movement	361	0.70
Samuel Ayala Santiago	Independent	280	0.54
Ivan B. Espinosa	Independent	169	0.33
Faith Dane Johnson	Independent	131	0.25
Hector Herrara	Independent	93	0.18
Total		51,655	100.00
Source: Government of the Virgin Islands

== Delegate to the United States House of Representatives ==
Candidate	Party	Votes	%
Ron de Lugo	Democratic Party	15,003	74.22
Janet Watlington	Independent	5,211	25.78
Total		20,214	100.00
Source: Government of the Virgin Islands
