= 1998 United States Virgin Islands general election =

1998 United States Virgin Islands gubernatorial election
- November 3, 1998
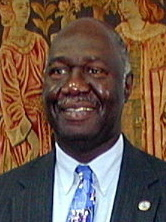

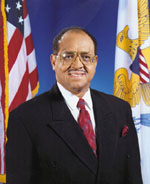
Nominee	Charles Turnbull	Roy Schneider
Party	Democratic	Independent
Running mate	Gerard Luz James	Juan Centeno
Popular vote	19,795	13,640
Percentage	59.09%	40.72%
Governor before election
Roy Schneider
Independent
Elected Governor
Charles Wesley Turnbull
Democratic

The 1998 United States Virgin Islands general election was held on November 3, 1998, to elect the Governor of the United States Virgin Islands, 15 members of the Legislature and the Delegate to United States House of Representatives. In the gubernatorial race, Democrat Charles Wesley Turnbull defeated incumbent Governor Roy Schneider.

== Gubernatorial election ==
On election day, November 3, 1998, Democratic nominee Charles Wesley Turnbull won the election by a margin of 5,804 votes against his opponent Governor Roy Schneider, thereby gaining Democratic control over the governorship. Turnbull was sworn in as the 6th Governor of the United States Virgin Islands on January 4, 1999.

Candidate	Running mate	Party	Votes	%
Charles W. Turnbull	Gerard Luz James	Democratic Party	19,795	59.09
Roy Schneider	Juan Centeno	Republican Party	13,640	40.72
Write in			64	0.19
Total			33,499	100.00

== Territorial Legislature ==
Senator At Large
Candidate	Party	Votes	%
Almando "Rocky" Liburd	Independent Citizens Movement	18,590	74.29
Craig Barshinger	Democratic Party	6,408	25.61
Write in		27	0.11
Total		25,025	100.00

St. Thomas/St. John
Candidate	Votes	%
Adlah Donastorg	9,940	10.44
Donald "Ducks" Cole	8,701	9.13
Lorraine Berry	8,633	9.06
Judy M. Gomez	8,209	8.62
Allie-Allison Petrus	8,026	8.43
Roosevelt St. Clair David	6,944	7.29
George E. Goodwin	6,640	6.97
Celestino A. White Sr.	6,530	6.86
Arturo Watlington Jr.	6,452	6.77
Stephen "Smokey" Frett	6,442	6.76
Clive Rivers	4,431	4.65
Wayne L. Sprauve	3,875	4.07
Milton A. "Bull" Frett	3,325	3.49
Luis Sylvester	2,971	3.12
Justin Harrigan Sr.	2,469	2.59
Wilma Marsh Monsanto	1,639	1.72
Write in	27	0.03
Total	95,254	100.00

St. Croix
Candidate	Party	Votes	%
Alicia "Chucky" Hansen		9,232	10.54
Vargrave Richards	Democratic Party	7,651	8.73
Adelbert Bryan		7,520	8.58
V. Anne Golden		6,694	7.64
Norman Baptiste	Democratic Party	6,464	7.38
Gregory Bennerson		6,384	7.29
David S. Jones	Democratic Party	6,321	7.22
Douglas E. Canton Jr.	Democratic Party	6,240	7.12
Raymond Richards		5,613	6.41
Lilliana Belardo de O'Neal		5,589	6.38
Ronald E. Russell	Democratic Party	5,402	6.17
Carol M. Burke	Democratic Party	4,847	5.53
Ophelia Williams-Felix	Democratic Party	3,676	4.20
Miguel A. Camacho		3,670	4.19
Frank E. Jacobs Jr.		1,377	1.57
Tyrone Sebastien Jr.		800	0.91
Write in		116	0.13
Total		87,596	100.00

== Delegate to the United States House of Representatives ==
Candidate	Party	Votes	%
Donna Christian-Green	Democratic Party	24,227	80.15
Victor O. Frazer	Independent	5,983	19.79
Write in		18	0.06
Total		30,228	100.00

== Referendums ==
Are you in favor of electing the Attorney General of the Virgin Islands?

Choice	Votes	%
For	13,998	73.77
Against	4,978	26.23
Total	18,976	100.00

Which method of electing senators are you in favor of?

Choice	Votes	%
Numbered seats	5,450	35.10
Geographical sub-district seats	4,729	30.45
Territorial at-large seat	3,782	24.36
Status quo	1,567	10.09
Total	15,528	100.00
