= 2002 United States Virgin Islands general election =

2002 United States Virgin Islands gubernatorial election
- November 5, 2002
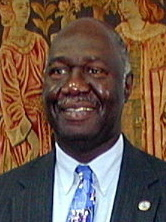

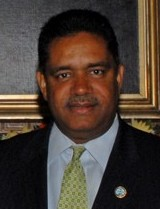
Nominee	Charles Turnbull	John de Jongh
Party	Democratic	Independent
Running mate	Vargrave Richards	Paul Arnold Sr.
Popular vote	17,545	8,618
Percentage	50.25%	24.68%
Governor before election
Charles Wesley Turnbull
Democratic
Elected Governor
Charles Wesley Turnbull
Democratic

The 2002 U.S. Virgin Islands gubernatorial election took place on 5 November 2002 in order to elect the Governor of the United States Virgin Islands, 15 members of the Legislature and the Delegate to United States House of Representatives. The election was held concurrently with the 2002 United States midterm elections.

Incumbent Democratic Governor Charles Wesley Turnbull won re-election with 50% of the vote over Independent candidate John de Jongh.

== Gubernatorial ==
Candidate	Running mate	Party	Votes	%
Charles W. Turnbull	Vargrave Richards	Democratic Party	17,545	50.25
John de Jongh	Paul Arnold Sr.	Independent	8,618	24.68
Alicia "Chucky" Hansen	Thomas E. Donoghue	Independent	2,715	7.78
Michael A. Bornn	Arnold M. Golden	Republican Party	2,513	7.20
Gerard Luz James	Maryleen Thomas	Independent	1,775	5.08
Cora Christian	George Hodge Jr.	Independent	1,070	3.06
Lloyd L. Williams	Kevin Gonzalez Sr.	Independent	519	1.49
Hernando "Ike" Williams	Jonathan Marius	Independent	106	0.30
Write in			51	0.15
Total			34,912	100.00

== Territorial Legislature ==
Senator At Large
Candidate	Party	Votes	%
Almando "Rocky" Liburd	Independent Citizens Movement	12,514	55.24
Craig W. Barshinger	Democratic Party	7,318	32.30
Wilma Marsh Monsanto	Independent	2,795	12.34
Write in		27	0.12
Total		22,654	100.00

St. Thomas/St. John
Candidate	Votes	%
Adlah Donastorg	9,106	9.19
Carlton "Ital" Dowe	7,809	7.88
Celestino A. White Sr.	6,859	6.92
Roosevelt St. Clair David	6,757	6.82
Lorraine Berry	6,750	6.81
Louis P. Hill	6,640	6.70
Shawn-Michel Malone	6,205	6.26
Donald "Ducks" Cole	6,155	6.21
Norma Pickard-Samuel	5,633	5.68
Malik Sekou	4,233	4.27
Kevin Rodriguez	4,075	4.11
Nicholas Friday	4,014	4.05
Alvin Williams	3,663	3.70
Stephen "Smokey" Frett	3,568	3.60
Winthrop L. Maduro	3,486	3.52
Ludrick Thomas	3,316	3.35
Dwayne A. Benjamin	3,131	3.16
Riise E. Smith-Richards	2,664	2.69
Wayne Adams	1,768	1.78
Gilmore Estrill Sr.	1,227	1.24
Lawrence Larry Boschulte	1,123	1.13
Patricia Varlack	580	0.59
Kevin Robert Jennings	294	0.30
Write in	40	0.04
Total	99,096	100.00

St. Croix
Candidate	Party	Votes	%
Douglas E. Canton Jr.	Democratic Party	6,723	8.06
Luther F. Renee	Democratic Party	6,589	7.90
Norman Baptiste		6,327	7.58
David S. Jones	Democratic Party	6,219	7.45
Ronald E. Russell	Democratic Party	6,040	7.24
Emmett Hansen II		5,626	6.74
Raymond "Usie" Richards		5,558	6.66
Adelbert Bryan		5,423	6.50
Juan Figueroa-Serville	Democratic Party	5,131	6.15
"Nemy" Williams-Felix	Democratic Party	4,905	5.88
Michael Thurland	Democratic Party	4,380	5.25
Hope Gibson		3,663	4.39
Noel Loftus		3,628	4.35
Robert Acosta		3,439	4.12
Oneida Dione Granger		2,699	3.23
Reuben Fenton		2,208	2.65
Luis A. Rodriguez		1,873	2.24
Ramon Benitez		1,436	1.72
Steve Nisky		955	1.14
Write in		630	0.75
Total		83,452	100.00

== Delegate to the United States House of Representatives ==
Candidate	Party	Votes	%
Donna Christian-Christensen	Democratic Party	20,414	67.67
Virdin C. Brown	Independent Citizens Movement	4,456	14.77
Lilliana Belardo de O'Neal	Republican Party	4,286	14.21
Garry A. Sprauve	Independent	996	3.30
Write in		13	0.04
Total		30,165	100.00
