= Elections in the United States Virgin Islands =

Elections in the U.S. Virgin Islands are held to elect senators to the Legislature of the U.S. Virgin Islands, the governor and lieutenant governor of the territory, and a delegate to the United States House of Representatives.

The U.S. Virgin Islands are an organized, unincorporated territory of the United States. Although they are U.S. citizens, Virgin Islanders cannot vote in U.S. Presidential elections. At the national level, the U.S. Virgin Islands elects a delegate to the United States Congress.

At the territorial level, fifteen senators to the Legislature of the Virgin Islands—seven from the district of Saint Croix, seven from the district of Saint Thomas and Saint John, and one senator at-large (who must be a resident of Saint John) -- are elected for two-year terms to the unicameral Virgin Islands Legislature.

Since 1970, the U.S. Virgin Islands has elected a territorial governor every four years. Previous governors were appointed by the President of the United States.

The main political parties in the U.S. Virgin Islands are the Democratic Party of the Virgin Islands, the Independent Citizens Movement (ICM), and the Republican Party of the Virgin Islands. Additional candidates run as independents.

== Gubernatorial elections ==
The most recent gubernatorial election was held on November 3, 2026.

== Legislative elections ==
The most recent legislative elections were held on November 3, 2026.

== Elections for Delegate to Congress ==
The current delegate to Congress is Stacey Plaskett.

== See also ==
- Electoral calendar
- Electoral system
- Political party strength in the United States Virgin Islands
