= 1996 United States Virgin Islands general election =

General elections were held in the United States Virgin Islands on 5 November 1996, to elect 15 members of the Legislature of the Virgin Islands and the Delegate to United States House of Representatives. A run off was held on 19 November 1996.

== Territorial Legislature ==
Senator At Large
Candidate	Party	Votes	%
Almando "Rocky" Liburd	Independent Citizens Movement	19,677	83.97
Craig Barshinger	Democratic Party	3,707	15.82
Write in		48	0.20
Total		23,432	100.00

St. Thomas/St. John
Candidate	Votes	%
Lorraine Berry	8,904	9.13
Adlah Donastorg Jr.	7,243	7.43
Stephen "Smokey" Frett	5,906	6.06
Celestino A. White Sr.	5,874	6.02
Roosevelt St. Clair David	5,863	6.01
Allie-Allison Petrus	5,862	6.01
Judy M. Gomez	5,658	5.80
George Goodwin	5,482	5.62
Arturo Watlington Jr.	5,366	5.50
Wayne Chinnery	5,152	5.28
Clement Magras	4,979	5.11
Osbert Potter	4,889	5.01
Bingley G. Richardson	4,118	4.22
Malik Sekou	3,990	4.09
Wayne L. Sprauve	3,776	3.87
Clive Rivers	3,601	3.69
Vinnie Mohanani	3,256	3.34
Wayne Adams	2,978	3.05
George H. Hodge Jr.	1,158	1.19
Wilma Marsh Monsanto	856	0.88
David F. Berry	747	0.77
Godfrey R. de Castro	746	0.76
Sheil Schulterbrandt	376	0.39
Lorraine Galiber-Gundel	302	0.31
Dale Wallace	252	0.26
Darril Augustin Rodgers	143	0.15
Write in	54	0.06
Total	97,531	100.00

St. Croix
Candidate	Votes	%
Alicia "Chucky" Hansen	7,277	8.47
David S. Jones	6,992	8.14
Vargrave Richards	6,672	7.77
Holland L. Redfield II	6,168	7.18
Adelbert Bryan	5,649	6.58
Miguel A. Camacho	5,567	6.48
Carol M. Burke	5,305	6.18
Gerard Luz James	4,887	5.69
Anne Golden	4,651	5.41
Lilliana Belardo de O'Neal	4,645	5.41
Gregory A. Bennerson	4,028	4.69
Sylvester H. Julien	3,283	3.82
Norman Baptiste	3,015	3.51
Rupert W. Ross Jr.	2,890	3.36
Hector L. Cintron	2,628	3.06
Winfield G. James	2,596	3.02
Mary Ann Pickard	2,549	2.97
Douglas E. Canton Jr.	2,065	2.40
George A. Farrelly	1,531	1.78
Clifford A. Christian	1,021	1.19
Valmy Thomas	914	1.06
Glenn A. "Butcher" Brown	566	0.66
Yvonne Ferdinand Ramsingh	378	0.44
Maria Ledesma	248	0.29
Phyllis Travis	125	0.15
Write in	256	0.30
Total	85,906	100.00

== Delegate to the United States House of Representatives ==
Candidate	Party	First round		Second round	
Candidate	Party	Votes	%	Votes	%
Donna Christian-Green	Democratic Party	11,749	38.61	12,869	51.93
Victor O. Frazer	Independent	10,315	33.90	11,913	48.07
Kenneth Mapp	Republican Party	8,316	27.33		
Write in		48	0.16		
Total		30,428	100.00	24,782	100.00
