= 2000 United States Virgin Islands general election =

General elections were held in the United States Virgin Islands on 7 November 2000, to elect 15 members of the Legislature of the Virgin Islands and the Delegate to United States House of Representatives.

== Territorial Legislature ==
Senator At Large
Candidate	Party	Votes	%
Almando "Rocky" Liburd	Independent Citizens Movement	13,855	64.90
Craig W. Barshinger	Democratic Party	7,469	34.99
Write in		23	0.11
Total		21,347	100.00

St. Thomas/St. John
Candidate	Votes	%
Adlah Donastorg Jr.	7,627	8.74
Celestino A. White Sr.	5,950	6.82
Donald "Ducks" Cole	5,740	6.58
Roosevelt St. Clair David	5,610	6.43
Carlton Dowe	5,557	6.37
Norma P. Samuel	5,203	5.96
Lorraine Berry	5,146	5.90
George E. Goodwin	5,120	5.87
Judy M. Gomez	4,284	4.91
Vinod Mohanani	4,260	4.88
Stephen "Smokey" Frett	3,719	4.26
Riise E. S. Richards	3,663	4.20
Dwayne A. Benjamin	3,282	3.76
Justin Harrigan Sr.	3,045	3.49
Tyrone Martín	2,708	3.10
Gaylord A. Sprauve	2,586	2.96
Glen J. Smith	2,516	2.88
Herbie Lockhart III	1,967	2.25
Michael Paiewonsky	1,499	1.72
Franke A. Hoheb	1,344	1.54
Wilma Marsh Monsanto	1,321	1.51
Dean Luke	1,135	1.30
Wayne B. M. Chinnery	1,018	1.17
Gilmore Estrill	962	1.10
Christoph Keith Massac	822	0.94
Charles V. Balch	584	0.67
Brian D. Dooley	322	0.37
Willis Phillips	222	0.25
Write in	81	0.09
Total	87,293	100.00

St. Croix
Candidate	Party	Votes	%
Douglas E. Canton Jr.	Democratic Party	6,042	7.79
Norman Baptiste	Democratic Party	5,888	7.59
Emmett Hansen II	Democratic Party	5,680	7.32
David S. Jones	Democratic Party	4,989	6.43
Alicia "Chucky" Hansen		4,877	6.29
Adelbert Bryan		4,472	5.76
Vargrave Richards	Democratic Party	4,083	5.26
Raymond "Usie" Richards		4,058	5.23
Luther Felix Renee		3,972	5.12
Lilliana Belardo de O'Neal		3,616	4.66
Ronald E. Russell	Democratic Party	3,504	4.52
Gail Watson Chiang		3,451	4.45
Ophelia N. Williams-Felix	Democratic Party	3,262	4.20
Noel Loftus		3,250	4.19
Loraine A. Gibbs		2,985	3.85
Gregory A. Bennerson		2,953	3.81
Violet Anne Golden		2,293	2.96
Valencio Jackson		1,606	2.07
Luis A. Rodriguez		1,427	1.84
Elroi E. Baumann		1,342	1.73
Malcolm Harris		1,323	1.71
Hector M. Maldonado		1,101	1.42
Blen "Butcher" Brown		743	0.96
Llanval W. Crooke		611	0.79
Write in		54	0.07
Total		77,582	100.00

== Delegate to the United States House of Representatives ==
Candidate	Party	Votes	%
Donna Christian-Christensen	Democratic Party	19,021	78.45
Victor O. Frazer	Independent	3,569	14.72
Jorge J. Estemac	Independent Citizens Movement	1,626	6.71
Write in		29	0.12
Total		24,245	100.00
