= Governor Williams =

Governor Williams may refer to:

- Abraham J. Williams (1781–1839), 3rd Governor of Missouri
- Arnold Williams (American politician) (1898–1970), 21st Governor of Idaho
- Benjamin Williams (1751–1814), 11th Governor of North Carolina
- Charles K. Williams (1782–1853), 20th Governor of Vermont
- David Rogerson Williams (1776–1830), 45th Governor of South Carolina
- David Williams (Royal Navy officer) (1921–2012), Governor of Gibraltar from 1982 to 1985
- Fenwick Williams (1800–1883), Governor of Gibraltar from 1870 to 1876
- G. Mennen Williams (1911–1988), 41st Governor of Michigan
- Jack Williams (American politician) (1909–1998), 13th Governor of Arizona
- James D. Williams (1808–1880), 17th Governor of Indiana
- Jared W. Williams (1796–1864), 21st Governor of New Hampshire
- John Bell Williams (1918–1983), 55th Governor of Mississippi
- Joseph H. Williams (1814–1896), 27th Governor of Maine
- Martin Williams (diplomat) (born 1941), Governor of the Pitcairn Islands from 1998 to 2001
- Philip Williams (United States Navy) (1869–1942), military governor of the United States Virgin Islands
- Ralph Champneys Williams (1848–1927), Governor of the Windward Islands from 1906 to 1909 and Dominion Governor of Newfoundland from 1909 to 1913
- Ransome Judson Williams (1892–1970), 102nd Governor of South Carolina
- Robert Williams (Mississippi politician) (1773–1836), Governor of the Mississippi Territory from 1805 to 1809
- Robert L. Williams (1868–1948), 3rd Governor of Oklahoma
- Roger Williams (1603–1683), "Governor for Life" of Aquidneck Island and Conanicut Island
