= 1994 United States Virgin Islands general election =

1994 United States Virgin Islands gubernatorial election
- November 8, 1994 (general); November 22, 1994 (runoff)
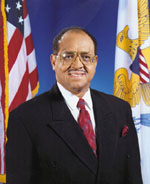
Nominee	Roy L. Schneider	Derek M. Hodge
Party	Independent	Democratic
Running mate	Kenneth Mapp	Alfred O. Heath
Popular vote	17,428	13,027
Percentage	57.23%	42.77%
Governor before election
Alexander A. Farrelly
Democratic
Elected Governor
Roy L. Schneider
Independent

General elections were held in the United States Virgin Islands on November 8, 1994, to elect a new governor and lieutenant governor, 15 members of the Legislature of the Virgin Islands and the Delegate to the United States House of Representatives.

== Gubernatorial election ==
On Election Day, Independent candidate Roy Schneider defeated Democratic nominee Derek Hodge.

=== Results ===
Candidate	Running mate	Party	First round		Second round	
Candidate	Running mate	Party	Votes	%	Votes	%
Roy L. Schneider	Kenneth Mapp	Independent	14,152	42.80	17,428	57.23
Derek M. Hodge	Alfred O. Heath	Democratic Party	9,130	27.61	13,027	42.77
Julio Brady	Holland L. Redfield II	Republican Party	8,096	24.49		
Wayne B. M. Chinnery	Hernando Williams	Independent	1,685	5.10		
Total			33,063	100.00	30,455	100.00

== Territorial Legislature ==
Senator At Large
Candidate	Party	Votes	%
Almando "Rocky" Liburd	Independent Citizens Movement	19,129	100.00
Total		19,129	100.00

St. Thomas/St. John
Candidate	Party	Votes	%
Allie Allison Petrus	Democratic Party	10,818	11.54
Osbert Potter		10,300	10.99
Celestino White Sr.		9,636	10.28
Judy Gomez		9,416	10.05
Lorraine Berry		8,740	9.33
Adlah Donastorg		8,583	9.16
Arturo Watlington		7,997	8.53
George Goodwin		7,533	8.04
Virdin Brown		5,785	6.17
Stephen "Smokey" Frett		5,559	5.93
Charlotte Poole Davis		3,763	4.02
Estrid Beryl Harthman		1,723	1.84
Wilma Marsh Monsanto		1,702	1.82
Luis Esquilin		922	0.98
Melvin Connor		684	0.73
Dale Wallace		553	0.59
Total		93,714	100.00

St. Croix
Candidate	Votes	%
Alicia "Chucky" Hansen	7,800	8.70
Winfield G. James	7,677	8.56
Adelbert Bryan	6,584	7.34
Lilliana Belardo de O'Neal	5,706	6.36
Gerard Luz James	5,037	5.62
Vargrave Richards	4,698	5.24
David Jones	4,675	5.21
Miguel A. Camacho	4,240	4.73
Bent Lawaetz	3,943	4.40
Gregory A. Bennerson	3,925	4.38
Wayne James	3,807	4.24
John F. Tutein	3,593	4.01
Mary Ann Pickard	3,255	3.63
Valdemar A. Hill Jr.	3,081	3.44
Maria Keywood	3,040	3.39
Peter Behringer	2,846	3.17
Violet Anne Golden	2,475	2.76
Robert Acosta III	2,359	2.63
Clifford Christian	2,302	2.57
Vera M. Falu	2,169	2.42
Sylvester H. Julien	1,697	1.89
Glenn "Butcher" Brown	1,387	1.55
Ralph J. Wilson Jr.	1,076	1.20
Alex Petersen	855	0.95
Valmy Thomas	585	0.65
Valerie Henderson	539	0.60
Melvin Williams	331	0.37
Total	89,682	100.00

== Delegate to the United States House of Representatives ==
Candidate	Party	First round		Second round	
Candidate	Party	Votes	%	Votes	%
Eileen R. Petersen	Democratic Party	10,819	34.11	13,817	45.48
Victor O. Frazer	Independent	10,321	32.54	16,561	54.52
Edgar D. Ross	Republican Party	5,513	17.38		
Michael A. Paiewonsky	Independent	5,069	15.98		
Total		31,722	100.00	30,378	100.00
