= 1976 United States Virgin Islands general election =

1976 United States House of Representatives election in the Virgin Islands
- November 9, 1976
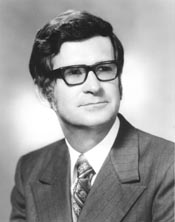

Nominee	Ron de Lugo	Alexander Moorhead
Party	Democratic	Independent Citizens
Popular vote	12,262	5,111
Percentage	70.58%	29.42%
Results by island
Lugo
70–80%
Moorhead
50–60%
Delegate to the U.S. House of Representatives before election
Ron de Lugo
Democratic
Elected Delegate to the U.S. House of Representatives
Ron de Lugo
Democratic

The 1976 United States Virgin Islands general election took place on November 9, 1976, to elect public officials in the United States Virgin Islands.

Losing candidates for U.S. House and the legislature did not have their political affiliations listed on election returns.

== Delegate to the United States House of Representatives ==
The 1976 United States House of Representatives election in the Virgin Islands took place on November 9, 1976. Incumbent Democrat Ron de Lugo was re-elected to another 2-year term.

=== Results ===
1976 United States House of Representatives election in the Virgin Islands
Party	Candidate	Votes	%
Democratic	Ron de Lugo	12,262	70.58%
Independent Citizens Movement	Alexander Moorhead	5,111	29.42%
Total votes		17,373	100%

==== Results by island ====
Island	Lugo		Moorhead		Margin
St. Croix	5,992	71.98%	2,332	28.02%	+43.97
St. John	258	48.59%	273	51.41%	+2.82
St. Thomas	6,012	70.58%	2,506	29.42%	+41.16

== Territorial Legislature ==
1976 United States Virgin Islands legislative election
- November 9, 1976

All 15 seats in the Legislature of the Virgin Islands
	Majority party	Minority party	Third party
Leader	Elmo D. Roebuck	Alexander Moorhead (retiring)	Hector Cintron
Party	Democratic	Independent Citizens	Republican
Leader since	1975	1975	1973
Leader's seat	St. Thomas–St. John	St. Croix	St. Croix
Seats before	11	3	1
Seats after	13	1	1
Seat change	▲2	▼2	Steady
- Gains and holds: Democratic gain Democratic hold Independent Citizens hold Republican hold Multi-member districts: Majority Democratic
President before election
Elmo D. Roebuck
Democratic
Elected President
Elmo D. Roebuck
Democratic

The 1976 United States Virgin Islands legislative election was held on November 9, 1976, to elect members of the 12th Virgin Islands Legislature. Voters were allowed to choose multiple candidates per district. Incumbent president Elmo D. Roebuck was re-elected at the start of the legislative session.

== Board of Education ==
Nine Democrats were elected to the Board of Education. All members were elected at-large. The top four candidates each from St. Croix and St. Thomas and one from St. John were given seats, regardless of how they placed overall.

1966 United States Virgin Islands legislative election (at-large district)
Party	Candidate	Votes	%
Democratic	Mario A. Watlington (St. Thomas)	5,150	9.99%
Democratic	Michael A. Paiewonsky (St. Thomas)	5,042	9.78%
Democratic	Patrick N. Williams (St. Croix)	4,969	9.64%
Democratic	Arnold Golden (St. Croix)	4,777	9.27%
Democratic	Al La Borde (St. Thomas)	4,221	8.19%
Democratic	Rudy Krigger (St. Thomas)	4,193	8.14%
Democratic	Eddy Rivera (St. Croix)	3,674	7.13%
Democratic	Ada Dice James (St. Croix)	3,657	7.09%
Nonpartisan	Edith Quetel Bryan (St. Thomas)	2,822	5.47%
Nonpartisan	Esther Carrilo (St. Croix)	1,885	3.65%
Nonpartisan	Lawrence R. Sewer (St. Thomas)	1,878	3.64%
Democratic	Joan A. Thomas (St. John)	1,806	3.50%
Nonpartisan	Sidney A. Hathcette (St. Thomas)	1,739	3.37%
Nonpartisan	Roy D. Roberts (St. Croix)	1,725	3.34%
Nonpartisan	Cynthia May-Cole (St. Croix)	1,460	2.83%
Nonpartisan	Jim McGee (St. Croix)	1,435	2.78%
Nonpartisan	Erva Greer (St. Thomas)	1,077	2.09%
Total votes		51,510	100%

== Board of Elections ==
Thirteen Democrats, eleven Independent Citizens, and two Republicans were elected to the Board of Elections.
