= 2008 United States Virgin Islands general election =

General elections were held in United States Virgin Islands on 4 November 2008, to elect 15 members of the Legislature and the Delegate to United States House of Representatives.

== Territorial Legislature ==
=== Democratic primary ===
The Democratic primary election were held on September 13, 2008. The top 7 candidates who receive the most votes would proceed to the general election.

Legislature of the Virgin Islands, At-large
Party	Candidate	Votes	%
Democratic	Craig Barshinger	3,062	51.46
Democratic	Lorelei Monsanto	1,676	28.17
Democratic	Harry Daniel	1,212	20.37

Legislature of the Virgin Islands, St. Croix district
Party	Candidate	Votes	%
Democratic	Michael Thurland	2,004	16.72
Democratic	Neville James (incumbent)	1,666	13.29
Democratic	Ronald E. Russell (incumbent)	1,573	13.12
Democratic	Wayne James	1,501	12.52
Democratic	James A. Weber III	1,393	11.62
Democratic	Sammuel Sanes	1,387	11.57
Democratic	Diane Capehart	1,274	10.63
Democratic	Juan Figueroa-Serville	1,190	9.93

Legislature of the Virgin Islands, St. Thomas-St. John district
Party	Candidate	Votes	%
Democratic	Shawn Michael-Malone (incumbent)	2,340	15.72
Democratic	Louis Patrick Hill	2,335	15.69
Democratic	Adlah Donastorg (incumbent)	2,150	14.45
Democratic	Alvin Williams (incumbent)	1,865	12.53
Democratic	Myron D. Jackson	1,864	12.52
Democratic	Patrick Simeon Sprauve	1,858	12.48
Democratic	Louis "Lolo" Willis	1,499	10.07
Democratic	Shirley M. Sadler	972	6.53

=== General election ===
Senator At Large
Candidate	Party	Votes	%
Craig W. Barshinger	Democratic Party	12,579	53.72
Carmen M. Wesselhoft	Independent Citizens Movement	10,812	46.17
Write in		27	0.12
Total		23,418	100.00

St. Thomas/St. John
Candidate	Party	Votes	%
Louis Patrick Hill	Democratic Party	8,616	10.48
Shawn-Michael Malone	Democratic Party	8,071	9.82
Adlah Donastorg	Democratic Party	7,621	9.27
Alvin Williams Jr.	Democratic Party	6,373	7.75
Patrick Simeon Sprauve	Democratic Party	5,211	6.34
Celestino A. White Sr.	Independent	5,129	6.24
Carlton "Ital" Dowe	Independent	5,042	6.13
Louis Milton Willis	Democratic Party	4,979	6.06
Myron D. Jackson	Democratic Party	4,812	5.86
Liston A. Davis	Independent Citizens Movement	4,699	5.72
Tregenza Roach	Independent	4,294	5.22
Lisa M. Williams	Independent	3,159	3.84
Dwane A. Callwood	Independent	2,774	3.38
Stephen "Smokey" Frett	Independent	2,585	3.15
Stedmann Hodge Jr.	Independent Citizens Movement	2,020	2.46
Samuel Fraco Man Harvey	Independent	1,805	2.20
Dolores T. Clendinen	Independent	1,114	1.36
Krim M. Ballentine	Republican Party	1,068	1.30
Mario A. Francis	Independent Citizens Movement	917	1.12
Helen Berry Baker	Independent	642	0.78
Lynn Joseph Porter	Independent	618	0.75
Moses Bones Skely Carty	Independent	580	0.71
Write in		56	0.07
Total		82,185	100.00

St. Croix
Candidate	Party	Votes	%
Terrence "Positive" Nelson	Independent Citizens Movement	7,432	9.84
Michael Thurland	Democratic Party	6,344	8.40
Sammuel Sanes	Democratic Party	5,260	6.97
Nellie Rivera-O'Reilly	Independent	5,030	6.66
Raymond "Usie" Richards	Independent Citizens Movement	4,944	6.55
Neville James	Democratic Party	4,782	6.33
Wayne James	Democratic Party	4,762	6.31
Ronald E. Russell	Democratic Party	4,698	6.22
James A. Weber III	Democratic Party	4,680	6.20
Diane Capehart	Democratic Party	4,534	6.00
Adelbert Bryan	Independent Citizens Movement	4,293	5.69
Norman Baptiste	Independent	4,186	5.54
Gonzalo Rivera	Independent	2,794	3.70
Lilliana Belardo de O'Neal	Republican Party	2,732	3.62
Kendall Seigo Petersen	Independent Citizens Movement	2,428	3.22
Naomi "Sandra" Joseph	Independent Citizens Movement	1,879	2.49
Dwain E. Ford	Republican Party	1,601	2.12
George Moore	Independent Citizens Movement	1,478	1.96
Samuel Flemming	Independent	730	0.97
Bernard J. Hamilton	Independent	610	0.81
Iotha Ineta Thomas	Independent	279	0.37
Write in		29	0.04
Total		75,505	100.00
Total votes		15,044	–
Registered voters/turnout		24,928	60.35

== Delegate to the United States House of Representatives ==
2008 United States House of Representatives election in the United States Virgin Islands
- November 4, 2008
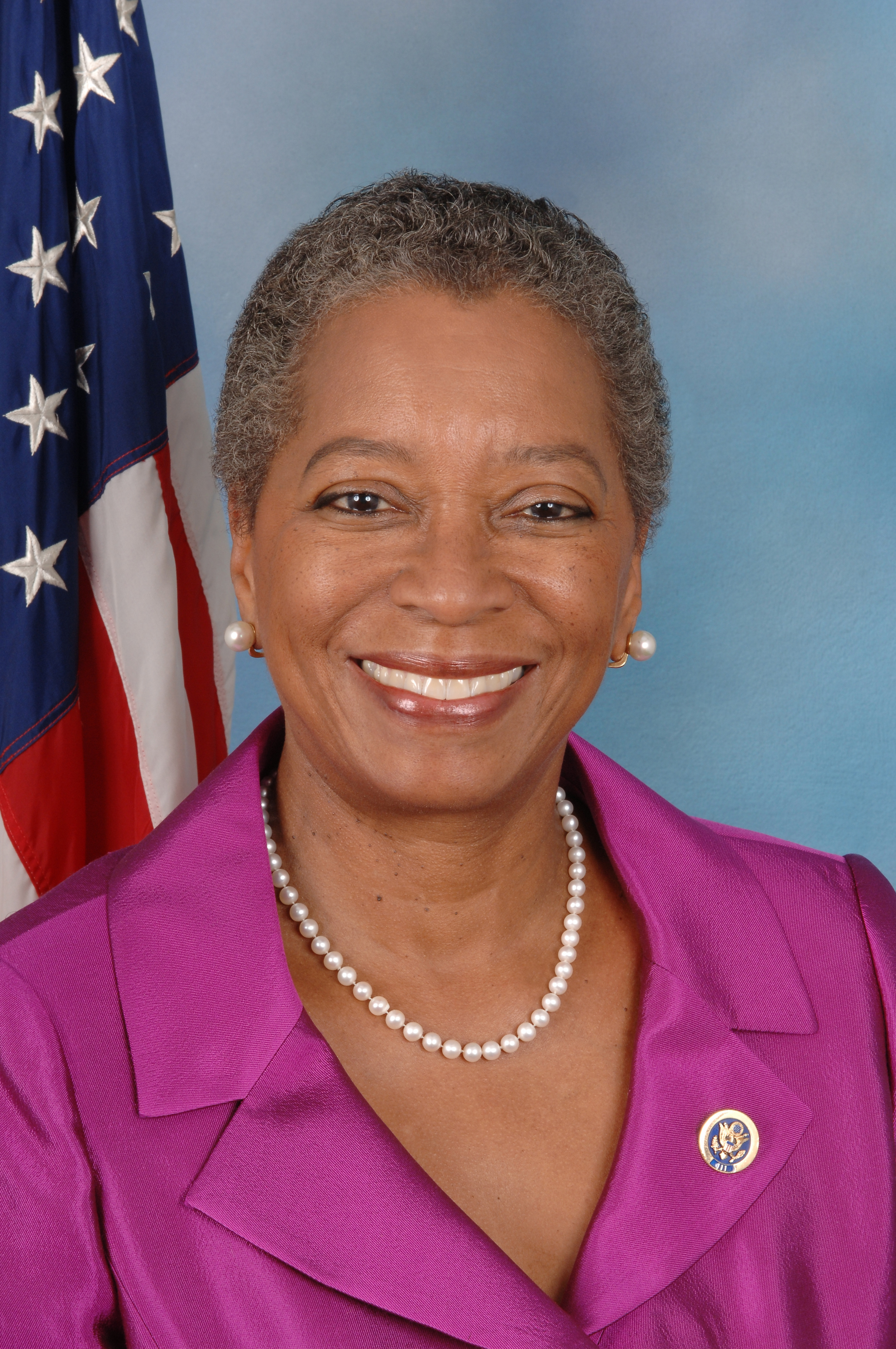
Nominee	Donna Christian-Christensen
Party	Democratic
Popular vote	19,286
Percentage	99.64%
Representative before election
Donna Christian-Christensen
Democratic
Elected Representative
Donna Christian-Christensen
Democratic

Incumbent U.S. Virgin Islands Delegate Donna Christian-Christensen announced that she intended to seek a fourth term in the United States House of Representatives. Her announcement of her decision to seek re-election came in a press conference held at her congressional district office in Sunny Isle, United States Virgin Islands, on January 10, 2008.

Christensen, who has held the seat since 1996, easily won re-election in the previous contest in 2006. She received 66% of the vote in 2006, in contrast to her nearest rival, Warren Mosler, who garnered 29% of the vote.

Christensen ran unopposed in the 2008 Congressional election. This all but guaranteed her successful re-election to the House of Representatives. As such, Christensen was re-elected again with over 99% of the popular vote.

United States Virgin Islands' At-large congressional district election, 2008
Party	Candidate	Votes	%
Democratic	Donna Christensen (inc.)	19,286	99.64
Write-ins		69	0.36
Total votes		19,355	100.00
Democratic hold			
