= 28th Virgin Islands Legislature =

Virgin Islands legislative session

28th Legislature of the Virgin Islands

Leadership
- President: Adlah Donastorg (D) (until April 16, 2009); Louis Patrick Hill (D)
- Vice President: Sammuel Sanes (D)
- Majority Leader: Neville James (D)

Structure
- Seats: 15
- Length of term: 2 years

The 28th Virgin Islands Legislature was a meeting of the Legislature of the Virgin Islands. It convened in Charlotte Amalie on January 12, 2009 and ended on January 10, 2011, during the last two years of Governor John de Jongh’s first term.

== Major events ==
- January 12, 2009: The 28th Legislature convenes its first session.
- January 26, 2009: Governor de Jongh delivered his State of Territory Address.
- April 16, 2009: Senate confirmed the nominations of Claudette Watson-Anderson to head Internal Revenue Bureau (IRB) and Angel Dawson as the new Commissioner for Finance. Gizette Canegata-Thomas and Violet Anne Golden were also approved to run the Casino Control Commission.
- April 16, 2009: Senate voted 8-6 to remove Adlah Donastorg from the position of President of the Legislature. Louis Patrick Hill becomes new Senate President.
- March 4, 2010: Senator Adlah Donastorg arrested on domestic violence charges.

== Major Legislation ==
=== Enacted ===
- February 6, 2009: An Act amending Act Nos. 7028, Sections 1 and 2; 7041, section 2a; 7042; 7045;7032; 7036 and 7043 to provide for adjusted appropriations for the operation of the Government of the Virgin Islands during the fiscal year October 1, 2008 to September 30, 2009.
- June 24, 2009: An Act amending Title 17 V.I.C., to add chapter 45 establishing the National Guard Youth Challenge Program and to authorize the Program to award participants an ault High School Diploma, and for other purposes making an appropriation to the Adjutant General. Act 7069: An Act amending Title 20 V.I.C., as it relates to safety belts and child restraints.
- July 3, 2009: Act 7077 (Bill No. 28-0018): An Act amending Title 20 V.I.C., and enacting the "Virgin Islands Motorcycle Safety Education Act of 2009".
- September 11, 2009: Act 7089: An Act amending Title 3 V.I.C., chapter 1, section 26b providing for free transportation to senior citizens on VITRAN buses. Act 7087 (Bill No. 28-0036): An Act providing that all employees of " Mannassah Bus Company" shall become full time employees of the GVI.
- April 7, 2010: An Act amending Title 14 V.I.C., relating to the prevention of pornography and exploitation of children.
- May 14, 2010: The Virgin Islands Smoke-Free Act
- August 20, 2010: Domestic Violence Prevention Act of 2010 + An Act requesting Department of Property and Procurement to identify property on St. Thomas to develop an automobile race track. + An Act appropriating $40,000 to VITEMA for tsunami escape route signs and tsunami preparedness.
- November 13, 2010: Act 7135 (Bill No. 0133): An Act amending 3 V.I.C., to establish a Veterans Memorial Cemetery.

=== Proposed (but not enacted) ===
- Bill No. 28-0003: An Act making an appropriation for debt service and loan repayment for the E911 Emergency Communication System. (introduced 1/23/2009 by Sen. Louis Patrick Hill)
- Bill No. 28-0006: An Act amending Title 1 V.I.C., adding chapter 16 establishing the "Virgin Islands Compensation Commission". (introduced 3/2/2009 by Sen. Neville James)
- Bill No. 28-0010: An Act amending Title 1 V.I.C., chapter 11, section 117 commemorating laborers on Contract Day or Fireburn as a day to be revered and remembered in the Virgin Islands. (introduced 3/3/2009 by Sen. Terrence “Positive” Nelson)
- Bill No. 28-0011: An Act amending Title 24 V.I.C., by adding chapter 21 establishing The Virgin Islands Consolidated Bargaining Council; amending 3 V.I.C., section 551d establishing an annual adjustment and performance standards of cost of living meritorious wage increases. (introduced 3/3/2009 by Sen. Terrence “Positive” Nelson)
- Bill No. 28-0015: An Act amending Title 3 V.I.C., to create the Department of Sports, Parks and Recreation and for othe related purposes. (introduced 3/3/2009 by Sen. Usie R. Richards)
- Bill No. 28-0021: An Act authorizing the Governor to establish an agreement with Lincoln Technical Institute to build a Technical School in the Virgin Islands. (introduced 3/12/2009 by Sen. Alvin Williams Jr.)
- Bill No. 28-0024: An Act amending Title 17 V.I.C., to establish Valedictorian and Saluatorian scholarship awards. (introduced 3/20/2009 by Sen. Terrence “Positive” Nelson)
- Bill No. 28-0044: An Act amending Title 34 V.I.C., enacting the "Minor Identification and Protection Act;" and for other purposes. (introduced 5/12/2009 by Sen. Neville James)
- Bill No. 28-0052: An Act restructuring the composition of the Government Employee's Service Commission. (introduced 5/15/2009 by Sen. Patrick Simeon Sprauve)
- Bill No. 28-0091: An Act amending Title 33 V.I.C., chapter 111, to establish the "Single Payer Ulitily Fund" and the parameters for its use.
- Bill No. 28-0093: An Act amending 2 V.I.C, enacting the "Legislative Youth Advisory Council". (introduced 7/21/2009 by Sen. Terrence “Positive” Nelson)
- Bill No. 28-0107: A resolution urging the U.S. Congress to enact the amended Interstate compact for juveniles. (introduced 7/30/2009 by Sen. Louis Patrick Hill)
- Bill No. 28-0150: An Act amending titles 3 and 30 V.I.C., to enact the Public Services Commission Reform Act of 2009.
- Bill No. 28-0232: An Act amending Title 29, V.I.C., subsection 919, as it relates to the composition of the Public Finance Authority’s Board of Directors.
- Bill No. 28-0237: An Act amending Title 3, V.I.C., chapter 33, section 881, to mandate that government agencies keep confidential the personal records of persons with whom they interact.
- Bill No. 28-0261: An Act establishing the “Virgin Islands Criminal Gang Prevention Act”.

== Veteoed ==
- April 7, 2010: Bill No. 28-0155 (now Act 7167): An Act to establish the Education Policy Improvement Act of 2010 (governor’s veto overridden on April 15, 2010); Bill No. 28-0190: An Act requiring the hiring of local workers by contractors who are awarded contracts to provide goods and services to the GVI.
- June 24, 2009: Act 7085: An Act amending Title 17 V.I.C., chapter 5, section 48 to establish the Youth Internship Program within the Department of Education. (governor’s veto overridden on August 20, 2009)
- July 3, 2009: Act 7100: An Act amending Title 17 V.I.C, chapter 5 to provide for the Worker Preparation Educarional Program for high school seniors. (governor’s veto overridden on September 17, 2009)
- August 20, 2009: An Act establishing a new Bureau of Narcotics and Dangerous Drug Control.
- September 11, 2009: Bill No. 0045: An Act amending title 24 V.I.C, chapter 17, section 451 (a) to prohibit the harassment and termination from employment of employees who file complaints with the Department of Labor.
- November 25, 2010: Bill No. 28-0141 (now Act 7141): An Act amending 20 V.I.C., chapter 43, to establish a prohibition against text-based communication while driving a motor vehicle in the Virgin Islands. (governor’s veto overridden on December 21, 2010)

== Major resolutions ==
- A Resolution establishing the Majority Caucus, the officers, chairpersons, vice-chairpersons and memberships of the standing committees of the 28th Legislature, and adopting the Rules of the 28th Legislature.
- An Act recognizing Eduardo “Nandy” Martinez-Rosario, Sr. posthumously for his many and varied accomplishments and contributions to this community and his achievements in fields ranging from sailing to outdoor sports and recreation to skilled labor.

== Members ==
District	Name	Party	Took office
At-large	Craig W. Barshinger	Democratic	2009
St. Croix	Neville James	Democratic	2006
St. Croix	Wayne A. James	Democratic	2009
St. Croix	Terrence Nelson	ICM	2006
St. Croix	Usie R. Richards	Democratic	2003
St. Croix	Nereida Rivera O’Reilly	Democratic	2009
St. Croix	Sammuel Sanes	Democratic	2009
St. Croix	Michael Thurland	Democratic	2009
St. Thomas/ St. John	Adlah Donastorg Jr.	Democratic	1995
St. Thomas/ St. John	Carlton Dowe	Independent	2001
St. Thomas/ St. John	Louis Patrick Hill	Democratic	2004
St. Thomas/ St. John	Patrick Simeon Sprauve	Democratic	2008
St. Thomas/ St. John	Shawn-Michael Malone	Democratic	2003
St. Thomas/ St. John	Celestino A. White, Sr.	Independent	1997

== See also ==
- List of Virgin Islands Legislatures
