= 2004 United States Virgin Islands general election =

General elections were held in the United States Virgin Islands on 2 November 2004, to elect 15 members of the Legislature of the Virgin Islands and the Delegate to United States House of Representatives.

== Territorial Legislature ==
Senator At Large
Candidate	Party	Votes	%
Craig W. Barshinger	Democratic Party	12,760	50.32
Almando "Rocky" Liburd	Independent Citizens Movement	12,441	49.06
Write in		158	0.62
Total		25,359	100.00

St. Thomas/St. John
Candidate	Votes	%
Shawn-Michael Malone	9,807	12.17
Adlah Donastorg	9,154	11.36
Louis Patrick Hill	7,705	9.56
Celestino A. White Sr.	6,924	8.59
Liston A. Davis	6,729	8.35
Lorraine Berry	6,579	8.16
Roosevelt St. Clair David	5,931	7.36
Carlton "Ital" Dowe	5,606	6.95
Alvin Williams	5,525	6.85
Donald "Ducks" Cole	4,230	5.25
Alex Randall	3,985	4.94
Stephen "Smokey" Frett	3,199	3.97
Nicholas Friday	2,988	3.71
Wilma Marsh Monsanto	1,495	1.85
Kevin Robert Jennings	383	0.48
Karl R. Caesar	336	0.42
Write in	34	0.04
Total	80,610	100.00

St. Croix
Candidate	Party	Votes	%
Neville James	Democratic Party	7,318	9.08
Pedro Pete Encarnacion	Democratic Party	6,170	7.66
Juan Figueroa Serville	Democratic Party	6,121	7.60
T. "Positive" Nelson	Independent Citizens Movement	6,120	7.60
Norman Baptiste	Independent	5,251	6.52
Raymond "Usie" Richards	Independent Citizens Movement	4,928	6.12
Ronald E. Russell	Democratic Party	4,773	5.92
Adelbert Bryan	Independent Citizens Movement	4,705	5.84
Michael Thurland	Democratic Party	4,612	5.72
Douglas E. Canton Jr.	Democratic Party	3,530	4.38
Emmett Hansen II	Democratic Party	3,257	4.04
Noel Loftus	Republican Party	3,112	3.86
Lilliana Belardo de O'Neal	Republican Party	2,854	3.54
Oneida Granger	Independent	2,840	3.52
Alicia "Chucky" Hansen	Independent	2,729	3.39
Wayne A. G. James	Independent	2,433	3.02
Troy D. Mason Sr.	Independent	1,986	2.46
Reuben Fenton	Republican Party	1,514	1.88
Rhea D. Dowling	Republican Party	1,475	1.83
Michael A. Monagle	Independent	1,040	1.29
Robert N. McAuliffe	Republican Party	905	1.12
David Montgomery King	Independent	902	1.12
Steve Nisky	Independent	815	1.01
Glen "Butcher" Brown	Independent	659	0.82
Gosnel Matthew	Independent	436	0.54
Write in		91	0.11
Total		80,576	100.00
Total votes		16,088	–
Registered voters/turnout		25,077	64.15

== Delegate to the United States House of Representatives ==
Candidate	Party	Votes	%
Donna Christian-Christensen	Democratic Party	17,379	65.75
Warren Mosler	Independent	7,522	28.46
Krim Ballantine	Republican Party	1,512	5.72
Write in		18	0.07
Total		26,431	100.00
