= Victor O. Frazer =

Saint Thomian lawyer and politician (born 1943)

Victor Frazer
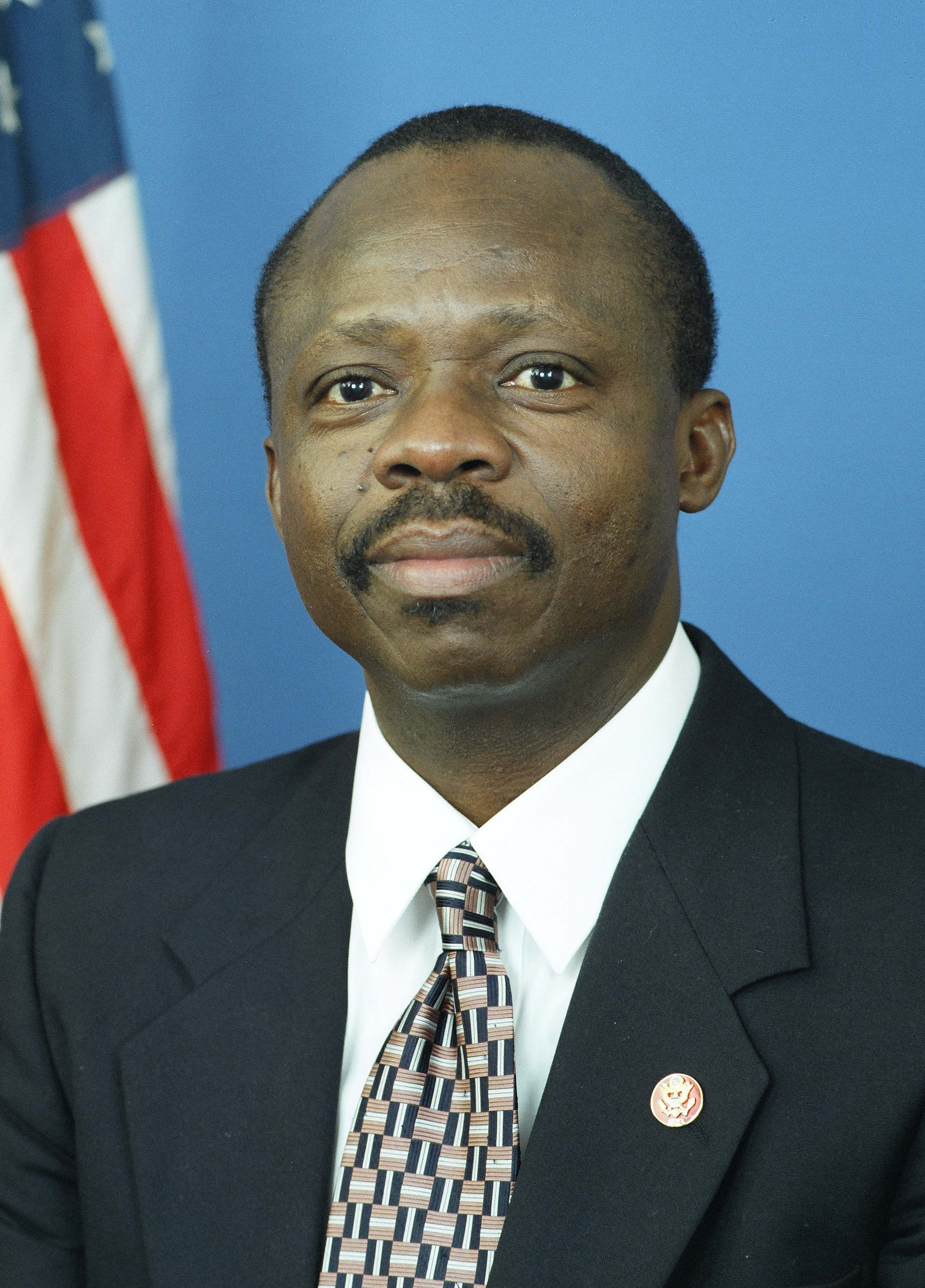

Delegate to the U.S. House of Representatives from the U.S. Virgin Islands' at-large district
- In office January 3, 1995 – January 3, 1997
- Preceded by: Ron de Lugo
- Succeeded by: Donna Christensen

Personal details
- Born: May 24, 1943 (age 83) Charlotte Amalie, U.S. Virgin Islands
- Party: Democratic
- Education: Fisk University (BA); Howard University (JD)

Victor O. Frazer (born May 24, 1943) is an American politician who served in the United States House of Representatives from the United States Virgin Islands' at-large congressional district as an independent from 1995 to 1997.

== Early life and education ==
Victor O. Frazer was born in Charlotte Amalie, U.S. Virgin Islands, on May 24, 1943, as one of ten children of Albert Frazer and Amanda Blyden. He graduated from Charlotte Amalie High School in 1960. He received a Bachelor of Arts degree from Fisk University in 1964, and a Juris Doctor from Howard University in 1971.

== Career ==
Frazer was admitted to the bars of New York, Maryland, U.S. Virgin Islands, and the District of Columbia. He worked for the Attorney General for the District of Columbia from 1974 to 1978, and then as a banker and lawyer for the Interstate Commerce Commission and United States Patent and Trademark Office. From 1987 to 1989, he was general counsel to the water and power authority in the U.S. Virgin Islands.

Frazer worked as an administrative assistant and counsel to U.S. Representatives Mervyn Dymally and as a special assistant to U.S. Representative John Conyers.

== Delegate ==
=== Elections ===
In the 1992 election Frazer ran against incumbent Ron de Lugo for a seat in the United States House of Representatives as a non-voting delegate from the United States Virgin Islands' at-large congressional district, but lost.

De Lugo retired for the 1994 election. Frazer placed second behind Democratic nominee Eileen R. Petersen in the initial election, but defeated her in the runoff. He lost to Democratic nominee Donna Christensen in the 1996 runoff election and unsuccessfully requested a recount. He lost to Christensen in the 1998 election.

Frazer initially ran in the 2000 election, but withdrew on September 21, 2000, as he viewed voters as unsophisticated. In the 2008 election Frazer sought the Democratic nomination against Christensen, but lost.

=== Tenure ===
During Frazer's tenure in the U.S. House he served on the Committee on International Relations. Despite being elected as an independent he chose to caucus with the House Democratic Caucus. He was a member of the Congressional Black Caucus.

Frazer was a member of congressional delegations that went to a Cuban refugee camp at the Guantanamo Bay detention camp and to examine the issue of missing in action soldiers in Vietnam. He visited eleven countries during his tenure. Ebony listed Frazer as one of the 100 most influential black Americans in May 1996.

== Later life ==
Frazer opened a consulting firm in the D.C. after leaving Congress.

== Personal life ==
Frazer has two children.

== Political positions ==
Frazer supported raising the federal minimum wage.

== Electoral history ==
Electoral history of Kurt Wright
Year	Office	Party	Primary			General			Result	Ref.
Year	Office	Party	Total	%	P.	Total	%	P.	Result	Ref.
1992	United States House of Representatives (USVI at-large)	Independent	No primary			8,913	38.76%	2nd	Lost	
1994	United States House of Representatives (USVI at-large)	Independent	No primary			16,561	54.52%	1st	Won	
1996	United States House of Representatives (USVI at-large)	Independent	No primary			11,913	48.07%	2nd	Lost	
1998	United States House of Representatives (USVI at-large)	Independent	No primary			5,983	19.79%	2nd	Lost	

== See also ==
- List of African-American United States representatives

== Works cited ==
=== News ===
- "Business support full Vietnam ties". Miami Herald. July 8, 1995. p. 19A – via Newspapers.com.
- "Congress delegate recognized". The Bradenton Herald. May 9, 1996. p. 8 – via Newspapers.com.
- "Delegate's foreign trips questioned". Miami Herald. October 22, 1996. p. 3A – via Newspapers.com.
- "Frazer Bows Out With Parting Shots". St. Thomas Source. September 21, 2000. Archived from the original on May 30, 2026.
- Santiago, Fabiola (February 18, 1995). "U.S. House delegates: Free refugees". Miami Herald. p. 2B – via Newspapers.com.

=== Web ===
- "Frazer, Victor O." United States House of Representatives. Archived from the original on May 30, 2026.
- "Statistics of the Congressional Election of November 3, 1992" (PDF). Clerk of the United States House of Representatives. 1993. Archived (PDF) from the original on May 22, 2026.
- "Statistics of the Congressional Election of November 8, 1994" (PDF). Clerk of the United States House of Representatives. 1995. Archived (PDF) from the original on May 30, 2026.
- "Statistics of the Congressional Election of November 5, 1996" (PDF). Clerk of the United States House of Representatives. 1997. Archived (PDF) from the original on November 25, 2025.
- "Statistics of the Congressional Election of November 3, 1998" (PDF). Clerk of the United States House of Representatives. 1999. Archived (PDF) from the original on April 2, 2017.

U.S. House of Representatives
Preceded by Ron de Lugo	Delegate to the U.S. House of Representatives from the United States Virgin Islands; 1995–1997	Succeeded by Donna Christian-Christensen
