= List of political parties in the United States Virgin Islands =

This article lists political parties in the United States Virgin Islands. The United States Virgin Islands has a three-party system, and many additional candidates run as independents.

== List ==
=== Registered parties ===
Party	Ideology	Year founded	Members (Feb. '25)	2022 gubernatorial vote	2024 U.S. House vote	Territorial executive offices	Territorial legislative seats
Democratic Party (D)	Modern liberalism	1948	29,833	12,157 (56.14%)	10,397 (73.39%)	2 / 2	12 / 15
Republican Party (R; GOP)	Conservatism	1948	2,069	No candidate	1,348 (9.52%)	0 / 2	0 / 15
Independent Citizens Movement (ICM)	Reformism	1968	1,141	740 (3.42%)	No candidate	0 / 2	0 / 15
No party			22,842	8,487 (39.19%)	2,422 (17.09%)	0 / 2	3 / 15

=== Other parties ===
Party	Ideology	Year founded
Green Party (GPUS)	Green politics	–

=== Defunct parties ===
Party	Notes	Years active
People's Party	Supported Puerto Rican immigrant interests.	1950s
Progressive Guide	Supported progressive causes such as social welfare.	1937–1952
United People's Party	Formed in 1974 out of the United Caribbean Association of Black People and the Black Power movement. Anti-colonial in nature.	c. 1974
Unity Party Unity-Democratic	Ideological splinter of the Democratic party out of the Progressive Guide. Dominated island politics in the 50s and successfully took over the Democratic Party by means of fraud in 1962.	1952–1962

== See also ==
- Politics of the United States Virgin Islands
- List of political parties by country
- Political party strength in the United States Virgin Islands
