= 31st Virgin Islands Legislature =

Virgin Islands legislative session

31st Legislature of the Virgin Islands

Leadership
- President: Neville James (D)
- Vice President: Janette Millin-Young (D)
- Majority Leader: Sammuel Sanes (D)
- Secretary: Myron D. Jackson (D)

Structure
- Seats: 15
- Length of term: 2 years

The 31st Virgin Islands Legislature was a meeting of the Legislature of the Virgin Islands. It convened in Charlotte Amalie on January 12, 2015, during the first two years of Kenneth Mapp’s governorship and adjourned on December 20, 2016.

== Legislation ==
=== Enacted ===
- March 17, 2015: Act 7730: An Act appropriating $1 million upon request by the Governor to pursue legal action against “Hess Oil V.I. Corp., HOVENSA, LLC, Petroleos de Venezuela, and PDVSA, VI, Inc.
- March 27, 2015: Act No. 7728: STARS Act
- May 20, 2025: Act No. 7734: An Act amending Virgin Islands Code, title 3, chapter 19 by adding section 334 relating to the development of marine tourism in the Virgin Islands. Act No. 7736: An Act providing for a feasibility study for establishing a plant for processing local fruits and other agricultural products, appropriating $75,000 for the feasibility study, and authorizing the V.I. Government to develop and operate the plant upon confirming its sustainability and securing sufficient funding.
- June 12, 2015: Act No. 7738: An Act changing the name of the road named in memory of the late Ambassador Alphonso Terence Todman and amending Act No. 7647 and correcting mistakes in the biographical information contained in Act No. 7647. Act No. 7737: An Act repealing Title 13 Virgin Islands Code, chapter 7, section 588 pertaining to the regulation of non-federally chartered credit unions and enacting title 9 Virgin Islands Code chapter 17A giving The Lieutenant Governor jurisdiction over non-federally chartered credit unions and cooperatives.
- July 30, 2025: Act No. 7742: The Second Chance For Jobs, Housing and Education After a Misdemeanor Conviction Act (vetoed by governor on March 20, 2015)
- Act No. 7798: An Act amending Title 31 Virgin Islands Code, Part I adding chapter 2 requiring notification to the public and utility companies before undertaking excavation of public or private lands and roadways and for other related purposes.
- August 18, 2015: Act No. 7744: An Act amending Title 5 establishing Judicial procedures for stalking victims and amending Title 14 Virgin Islands Code, chapter 104 to rename the chapter and to better define stalking. Act No. 7743: An Act amending Title 20 Virgin Islands Code, chapter 49, section 741 to expand the definition of “abandoned motor vehicle” and for other purposes. Act No. 7745: An Act directing the Virgin Islands Department of Tourism, in collaboration with the Virgin Islands Economic Development Authority, to promote the island of St. Croix to those visiting St. Thomas and St. John, and for other purposes. Act No. 7747: An Act requiring the Department of Agriculture to conduct a feasibility study of the production, marketability and medicinal value of the Moringa Trees and commercial value of the production of Bamboo and Aloe vera in the Territory and the potential commercial value of Bamboo production.
- September 22, 2015: Act No. 7798: An Act amending Title 31 Virgin Islands Code, Part I adding chapter 2 requiring notification to the public and utility companies before undertaking excavation of public or private lands and roadways and for other related purposes. (vetoed by governor on June 12, 2015) Act No. 7799: An Act amending title 14 Virgin Islands Code, chapter 1 adding subchapter VIII providing for Harassment Prevention Orders.
- September 30, 2015: Act No. 7753: An Act ratifying the Second Renewal Agreement for Group Medical Health Insurance with CIGNA Health and Life Insurance Company and the Fourth Renewal of Group Dental Health Insurance with CIGNA Health Insurance Company.
- October 7, 2015: Act No. 7771: An Act amending Title 1 Virgin Islands Code by designating the month of November the “David Hamilton Jackson Month” and providing for the digitization of all publications of The Herald and of all historically significant documents about David Hamilton Jackson. Act No. 7755: An Act amending title 19 Virgin Islands Code, part V, adding chapter 48 establishing an Autoimmune Disease Registry. Act No. 7756: An Act requiring the Commissioner of the Virgin Islands Department of Public Works to provide VITRAN bus service on weekends and holidays. Act No. 7765: An Act appropriating funds for the operating expenses of the Legislature of the Virgin Islands for the fiscal year ending September 30, 2016. Act No. 7766: An Act providing appropriations for operating expenses of the Supreme Court of the Virgin Islands, the Superior Court of the Virgin Islands, the Judicial Council and the Office of the Territorial Public Defender.
- October 8, 2015: Act No. 7790: An Act providing the operating expenses of the Office of Collective Bargaining for fiscal year October 1, 2015 to September 30, 2016. Act No. 7794: An Act amending title 33 Virgin Islands Code, chapters 3 to designate portions of the excise taxes as advance disposal fees and chapter 111 to and increase the schedule of rates for excise taxes for certain products, and to enact a technical amend to Act 7536 to revive the Antilitter and Beautification Fund.
- January 21, 2016: Act No. 7808: An Act amending Title 15, part I, chapter 1, section 18 of the Virgin Islands Code, which permits a child born after the making of a will to collect from a decedent's estate, by authorizing the establishment of paternity through DNA testing. Act No. 7816: An Act authorizing funding from the Communities Facilities Trust Account for the Horace Clark Ballpark Project.
- January 26, 2016: Act No. 7325: An Act amending Title 14, chapter 113 of the Virgin Islands Code by defining the term assault rifle, and specifically criminalizing the unlicensed possession of an assault rifle and amending title 23, chapter 5, section 451 by adding a definition for assault rifle. Act No. 7826: An Act amending Title 23 Virgin Islands Code, chapter 5, relating to concealed weapons establishing special requirements or concealed weapons licenses in the Virgin Islands.
- February 1, 2016: Act No. 7834: An Act providing temporary housing for the Governor of the Virgin Islands and for other purposes.
- March 23, 2016: Act No. 7855: An Act amending Title 19 Virgin Islands Code, chapter 58 to establish the Virgin Islands Blood Donation Program.
- February 25, 2016: Act No. 7850: An Act amending Title 27 Virgin Islands Code, chapter 7, relating to various provisions of the Trades and Crafts Code. (vetoed by governor on January 26, 2026)
- March 23, 2016: Act No. 7839: An Act amending title 33 Virgin Islands Code, chapter 3 relating excise taxes on cigarettes and chapter 111 establishing “The Virgin Islands Sin Tax Fund”. Act No. 7842: An Act amending title 20 Virgin Islands Code, part II, chapter 43, sections 494 and 512 pertaining to speeding, setting double fines for speeding in a work zone.
- April 22, 2016: Act No. 7859: An Act amending Title 18 Virgin Islands Code, chapter 17, subchapter II, section 384 relating to the prohibition against the filing of nomination papers for Governor and Lieutenant Governor by candidates who are not of the same political parties.
- May 19, 2016: Act No. 7878: The Virgin Islands Public Officials Compensation Commission Act
- May 27, 2016: Act No. 7875: An Act authorizing the Department of Human Services to develop a comprehensive care program for females in the Youth Rehabilitation Center and the Juvenile Justice System.
- July 30, 2016: Act No. 7895: An Act amending title 23 Virgin Islands Code, chapter 5, section 470 pertaining to the registry of firearms.
- September 22, 2016: Act No. 7929: An Act providing for a Virgin Islands comprehensive violence and public health study. (vetoed by governor on July 28, 2016)
- January 3, 2017: Act No. 7954: An Act to provide funding for repairs at Gov. Juan F. Luis Hospital and Medical Center from the Community Facilities Trust Account.
- January 20, 2017: Act No. 7975: An Act granting a conditional use variance to Plot No. 115-A, Estate Green Cay, St. Croix from R-1 (Residential-Low Density) for the operation of a veterinary medical clinic.

=== Proposed (but not enacted) ===
- Bill No. 31-0002: An Act amending title 20 Virgin Islands Code, chapter 39, section 436 to allow for discounts for obtaining or renewing taxi licenses for senior citizens.
- Bill No. 31-0008: An Act amending Title 18 to require no party or independent candidates to participate in a primary election.
- Bill No. 31-0012: An Act providing for property tax benefits for retirees on the Government Employees Retirement System who are owed retroactive wages.
- Bill No. 31-0025: An Act naming the baseball field at the D.C. Canegata Ballpark and Recreational Facility “The Valmy Thomas Baseball Field”.
- Bill No. 31-0043: An Act authorizing the Virgin Islands Port Authority to conduct a cost and feasibility study for the design, construction and operation of a motel or inn near the Randall “Doc” James Race Track on the island of St. Croix.
- Bill No. 31-0047: An Act making an appropriation from the money received from the HOVENSA, LLC Settlement to repair the small piers at the Christiansted Boardwalk.
- Bill No. 31-0054: An Act to conduct a feasibility study on the construction of a gas station which would be wholly owned and operated by the V.I. Government.
- Bill No. 31-0060: An Act amending title 30, chapter 1, subchapter 1, section 2 of the Virgin Islands Code to provide for a district determined LEAC rate for WAPA customers.
- Bill No. 31-0063: An Act amending title 2 Virgin Islands Code, chapter 2, section 30 establishing a separate fiscal year for the Legislature of the Virgin Islands.
- Bill No. 31-0096: An Act prohibiting the Department of Education from using Common Core Standards (CCSS) aligned testing (Smarter Balanced Assessment) to evaluate teachers, principals, schools or school Districts.
- Bill No. 31-0117: An Act amending Title 3 Virgin Islands Code, chapter 1, section 26b to establish a discounted rate for senior citizens and veterans for airport parking.
- Bill No. 31-0131: An Act providing for the implementation of single-gender instruction in Virgin Islands public schools.
- Bill No. 31-0142: An Act providing an appropriation from the Tourism Revolving Fund to Cane Bay Films for the video promotion of the island of St. Croix during the fiscal year October 1, 2015 through September 30, 2016.
- Bill No. 31-0173: An Act amending Title 3 Virgin Islands Code, chapter 1, section 8b to extend burial death benefits to veterans who were domiciled outside of the Virgin Islands at their time of death.
- Bill No. 31-0189: An Act bestowing the Medal of Honor on John A. Bell Sr., naming the correctional facility located at Golden Grove, St. Croix, Virgin Islands in his honor and repealing Act No. 7645.

== Resolutions ==
=== Adopted ===
- Res No. 1816: A resolution establishing the Majority Caucus, electing the officers, appointing chairpersons, vice-chairpersons and members to the standing committees of the 31st Legislature of the Virgin Islands, and adopting the Rules of the 31st Legislature.
- Res No. 1817: A resolution amending Resolution No. 1816 to reassign certain members of the Standing Committee on Culture, Historic Preservation, Youth and Recreation and the Committee on Housing, Public Works, and Waste Management.
- Res. No. 7752: A resolution to commemorate the 50th anniversary of the Vietnam War.
- Res No. 1830: An Act amending title 1 Virgin Islands Code, chapter 11 by adding section 200f establishing the last Sunday in September as Gold Star Mother's Day.
- Res No. 1818: A resolution to honor and commend world-renowned jockey Victor Lebron for his career accomplishments.
- Res No. 1819: A resolution honoring and commending the career accomplishments of world renowned jockey, Kevin Krigger, for his accomplishments.
- Res No. 1824: A resolution petitioning the United States Congress to offer full care medical services for veterans living in the Virgin Islands.
- Res No. 1838: A resolution petitioning the Governor to join with the Legislature in developing a comprehensive program with focus on education and awareness of the contributions of people of African descent throughout the Caribbean.

== See also ==
- List of Virgin Islands Legislatures
