= 1992 United States Virgin Islands general election =

General elections were held in the United States Virgin Islands on 3 November 1992, to elect 15 members of the Legislature of the Virgin Islands and the Delegate to United States House of Representatives.

== Territorial Legislature ==
Senator At Large
Candidate	Party	Votes	%
Almando "Rocky" Liburd	Independent Citizens Movement	13,732	63.38
Robert O'Connor Jr.	Democratic Party	7,934	36.62
Total		21,666	100.00

St. Thomas/St. John
Candidate	Party	Votes	%
Judy M. Gomez	Democratic Party	9,123	11.08
Bingley G. Richardson Sr.	Democratic Party	7,713	9.37
George Goodwin	Democratic Party	7,159	8.69
Celestino A. White Sr.	Independent	5,857	7.11
Lorraine Berry	Democratic Party	5,571	6.76
Osbert Potter	Independent	5,539	6.73
Arturo Watlington Jr.	Democratic Party	5,535	6.72
Allie-Allison Petrus	Independent	5,530	6.71
Adlah Donastorg	Independent	5,024	6.10
Elmo D. Roebuck	Democratic Party	4,932	5.99
Virdin C. Brown	Independent Citizens Movement	4,024	4.89
Stephanie Scott-Williams	Independent	3,846	4.67
Lloyd L. Williams	Democratic Party	3,508	4.26
Malcolm C. Callender	Independent Citizens Movement	2,120	2.57
Peter Goodwin	Independent	1,388	1.69
Wilma Marsh Monsanto	Independent	1,347	1.64
Luis R. Esquilin	Republican Party	1,012	1.23
Gustave R. Dowling	Independent	931	1.13
Jacqueline V. Reese	Independent	753	0.91
Melvin "Pep" Williams	Independent Citizens Movement	552	0.67
Hiram Rasool Abiff	Independent	498	0.60
Dale Wallace	Independent Citizens Movement	392	0.48
Total		82,354	100.00

St. Croix
Candidate	Party	Votes	%
Kenneth Mapp	Republican Party	7,951	11.40
Edgar D. Ross	Republican Party	6,587	9.45
Mary Ann Pickard	Democratic Party	5,986	8.59
Alicia "Chucky" Hansen	Independent	5,871	8.42
Gerard Luz James	Democratic Party	5,139	7.37
Holland L. Redfield II	Republican Party	5,134	7.36
Lilliana Belardo de O'Neal	Republican Party	4,682	6.72
Adelbert Bryan	Independent Citizens Movement	4,355	6.25
St. Claire N. Williams	Democratic Party	3,799	5.45
Bent Lawaetz	Democratic Party	3,557	5.10
John F. Tutein	Democratic Party	3,528	5.06
Michael Antonio Joseph	Republican Party	3,169	4.55
Winfield G. James	Independent	3,082	4.42
Gregory A. Bennerson	Republican Party	2,945	4.22
Alicia Torres James	Independent	2,382	3.42
Robert Acosta III	Democratic Party	1,150	1.65
Hernando Williams	Independent	407	0.58
Total		69,724	100.00

== Delegate to the United States House of Representatives ==
Candidate	Party	Votes	%
Ron de Lugo	Democratic Party	14,084	61.24
Victor O. Frazer	Independent	8,913	38.76
Total		22,997	100.00
