= 2006 United States Virgin Islands general election =

- Gubernatorial election
- November 7, 2006 (general); November 21, 2006 (run off)
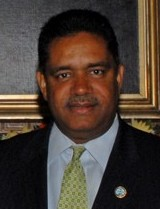

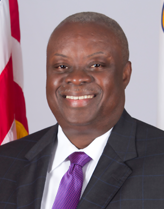
Nominee	John de Jongh	Kenneth Mapp
Party	Democratic	Independent
Running mate	Gregory Francis	Almando "Rocky" Liburd
Popular vote	16,644	12,402
Percentage	57.18%	42.61%
Governor before election
Charles W. Turnbull
Democratic
Elected Governor
John de Jongh
Democratic

General elections were held in the U.S. Virgin Islands on November 7, 2006 in order to elect the goverbor, 15 members of the Legislature and the delegate to United States House of Representatives. Incumbent Democratic governor Charles Wesley Turnbull was term-limited and couldn't run for re-election to a third term in office. John de Jongh failed to win in the first round by just 2 votes, since no candidate received a majority in the general election, as required by the Revised Organic Act of the Virgin Islands, a runoff was held between John de Jongh and Kenneth Mapp, the two top vote getters.

== Results ==
=== Governor ===
Candidate	Running mate	Party	First round		Second round	
Candidate	Running mate	Party	Votes	%	Votes	%
John de Jongh	Gregory Francis	Democratic Party	16,988	50.00	16,644	57.18
Kenneth Mapp	Almando "Rocky" Liburd	Independent	9,100	26.78	12,402	42.61
Adlah Donastorg	Cora Christian	Independent	7,871	23.16		
Write in			19	0.06	63	0.22
Total			33,978	100.00	29,109	100.00
Total votes			35,451	–		
Registered voters/turnout			53,017	66.87		

=== Territorial Legislature ===
Senator At Large
Candidate	Party	Votes	%
Carmen M. Wesselhoft	Independent Citizens Movement	15,279	54.51
Craig W. Barshinger	Democratic Party	12,738	45.44
Write in		13	0.05
Total		28,030	100.00
Total votes		35,451	–
Registered voters/turnout		53,017	66.87

St. Thomas/St. John
Candidate	Party	Votes	%
Shawn-Michael Malone	Democratic Party	11,342	12.11
Celestino White Sr.	Independent	9,401	10.04
Liston A. Davis	Independent Citizens Movement	8,778	9.38
Louis Patrick Hill	Democratic Party	8,574	9.16
Carlton "Ital" Dowe	Independent	8,180	8.74
Basil Ottley Jr.	Democratic Party	8,169	8.73
Alvin L. Williams	Democratic Party	7,966	8.51
Ludrick Thomas	Independent Citizens Movement	6,696	7.15
Horace T. Brooks	Democratic Party	5,157	5.51
Norma Pickard-Samuel	Independent	4,404	4.70
Toi A. Barbel	Democratic Party	4,182	4.47
Patrick Simeon Sprauve	Democratic Party	3,880	4.14
Stephen "Smokey" Frett	Independent	3,569	3.81
Lorelei Monsanto	Independent	2,179	2.33
Ada Hodge	Independent	755	0.81
Leslie A. Smith II	Independent	340	0.36
Write in		48	0.05
Total		93,620	100.00
Total votes		18,068	–
Registered voters/turnout		27,530	65.63

St. Croix
Candidate	Party	Votes	%
T. "Positive" Nelson	Independent Citizens Movement	9,379	11.05
Ronald E. Russell	Democratic Party	7,926	9.34
Raymond "Usie" Richards	Independent Citizens Movement	6,919	8.15
Norman Baptiste	Independent	6,796	8.00
Juan Figueroa Serville	Democratic Party	6,695	7.89
Jimi Weber	Democratic Party	6,676	7.86
Neville James	Democratic Party	6,658	7.84
Michael Thurland	Democratic Party	6,360	7.49
Wayne A. G. James	Democratic Party	5,967	7.03
Luther Felix Renee	Democratic Party	4,963	5.85
Luis Garcia	Republican Party	2,995	3.53
Gonzalo Rivera	Independent	2,581	3.04
Naomi "Sandra" Joseph	Independent	2,410	2.84
Troy D. Mason	Independent	2,226	2.62
George Moore	Independent	2,043	2.41
Hope Gibson	Independent	2,034	2.40
Rhea Dowling	Independent	1,589	1.87
Gosnel Matthew	Independent	589	0.69
Write in		95	0.11
Total		84,901	100.00
Total votes		17,383	–
Registered voters/turnout		25,487	68.20

=== Delegate to the United States House of Representatives ===
Candidate	Party	Votes	%
Donna Christian-Christensen	Democratic Party	19,593	63.60
Warren Mosler	Independent	11,201	36.36
Write-in		11	0.04
Total		30,805	100.00
Total votes		35,451	–
Registered voters/turnout		53,017	66.87
