= Henry Hughes Hough =

United States admiral (1871–1943)

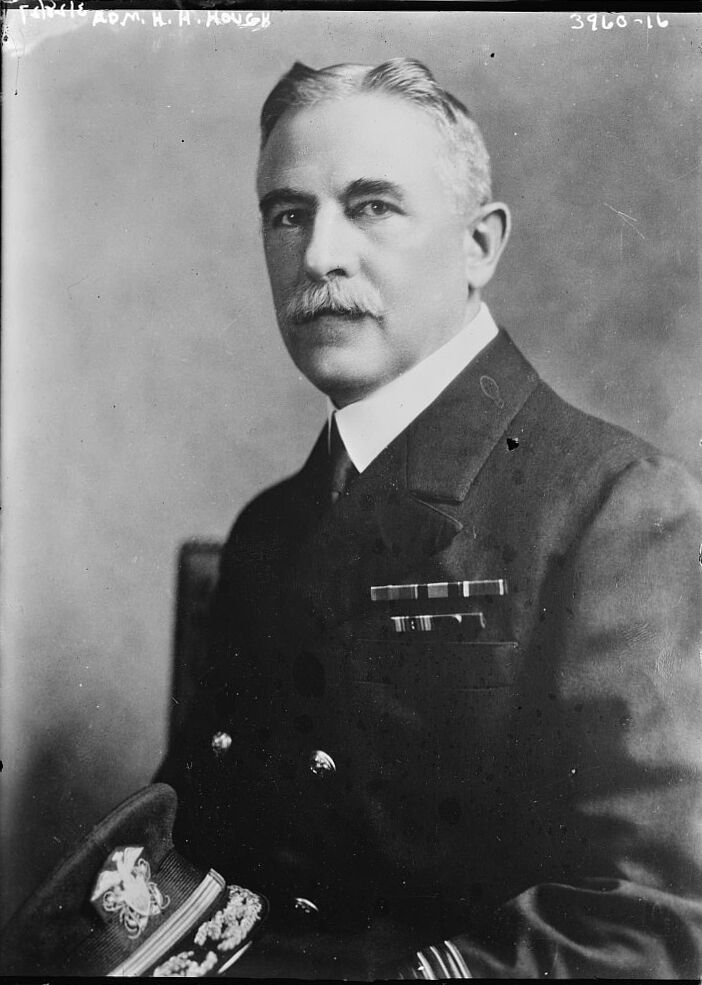
- Hough in 1916

Governor of the United States Virgin Islands
- In office September 16, 1922 – December 3, 1923
- Appointed by: Warren G. Harding

Director of Naval Intelligence
- In office December 1923 – September 1925

Personal details
- Born: St. Pierre and Miquelon, France; January 8, 1871
- Died: September 9, 1943 (aged 72) New York City, US
- Awards: Officer of the Legion of Honour

Military service
- Allegiance: United States
- Branch/service: US Navy
- Years of service: 1891-1935
- Rank: Rear Admiral
- Commands: USS Wilmington; USS Utah; USS New York
- Battles/wars: Spanish-American War; World War I; Yangtze Patrol

Henry Hughes Hough (/ˈhʌf/ HUF) (January 8, 1871 – September 9, 1943) was a Rear Admiral of the United States Navy and one-time military Governor of the United States Virgin Islands. In 1923 he was the director of the Office of Naval Intelligence. He commanded the Yangtze Patrol from 1925 to 1927.

== Biography ==
He was born on January 8, 1871, in the French overseas colony of Saint-Pierre and Miquelon, off the coast of Newfoundland. In 1901 he married Flaurence Oliphant Ward.

Hough graduated from the United States Naval Academy in 1891. He served on board the torpedo boat Morris during the Spanish–American War. Following the war, he alternated assignments in the Naval Intelligence office with ship-board duties. In 1911, he was made the Navy attaché to France and, later, to Russia. From 1914 to 1915, he was given his first command: the gunboat Wilmington, assigned to the Naval Academy. In 1918, he was made a Staff Representative and district commander in Brest, France, as part of the overall Naval Forces, France Command. He was subsequently also a commissioner of the Prisoner of War Conference in Berne, Switzerland. From 1919 to 1921, he commanded the battleship Utah, and from 1921 to 1922, the New York.

In 1922, while still a Captain, he was appointed by President Warren G. Harding as the Governor of the United States Virgin Islands, a role that he only acted in for a year. Hough was the first non-acting military governor to govern as a Captain, rather than a Rear Admiral, and the first not to be born in the United States.

In 1923, he was appointed as Director of Naval Intelligence and the following year on June 14, 1924, he was promoted to Rear Admiral. He commanded the Yangtze Patrol from 1925 until December 5, 1927, when command was assumed by Rear Admiral Yates Stirling Jr. He retired from the Navy in 1935 and died in 1943.

Hough is buried in Arlington National Cemetery in Virginia. Hough was survived by his wife, Flaurence Oliphant (1877–1970).

Political offices
Preceded by Sumner Ely Wetmore Kittelle	Governor of the U.S. Virgin Islands; 1922–1923	Succeeded by Philip Williams
