= USS Utah =

Two ships of the United States Navy have been named USS Utah in honor of the 45th state.

- USS Utah (BB-31), a Florida-class battleship, was launched on 23 December 1909 and was sunk during the Attack on Pearl Harbor on 7 December 1941
- USS Utah (SSN-801), a Virginia-class submarine currently authorized for construction
