= Martin Edward Trench =

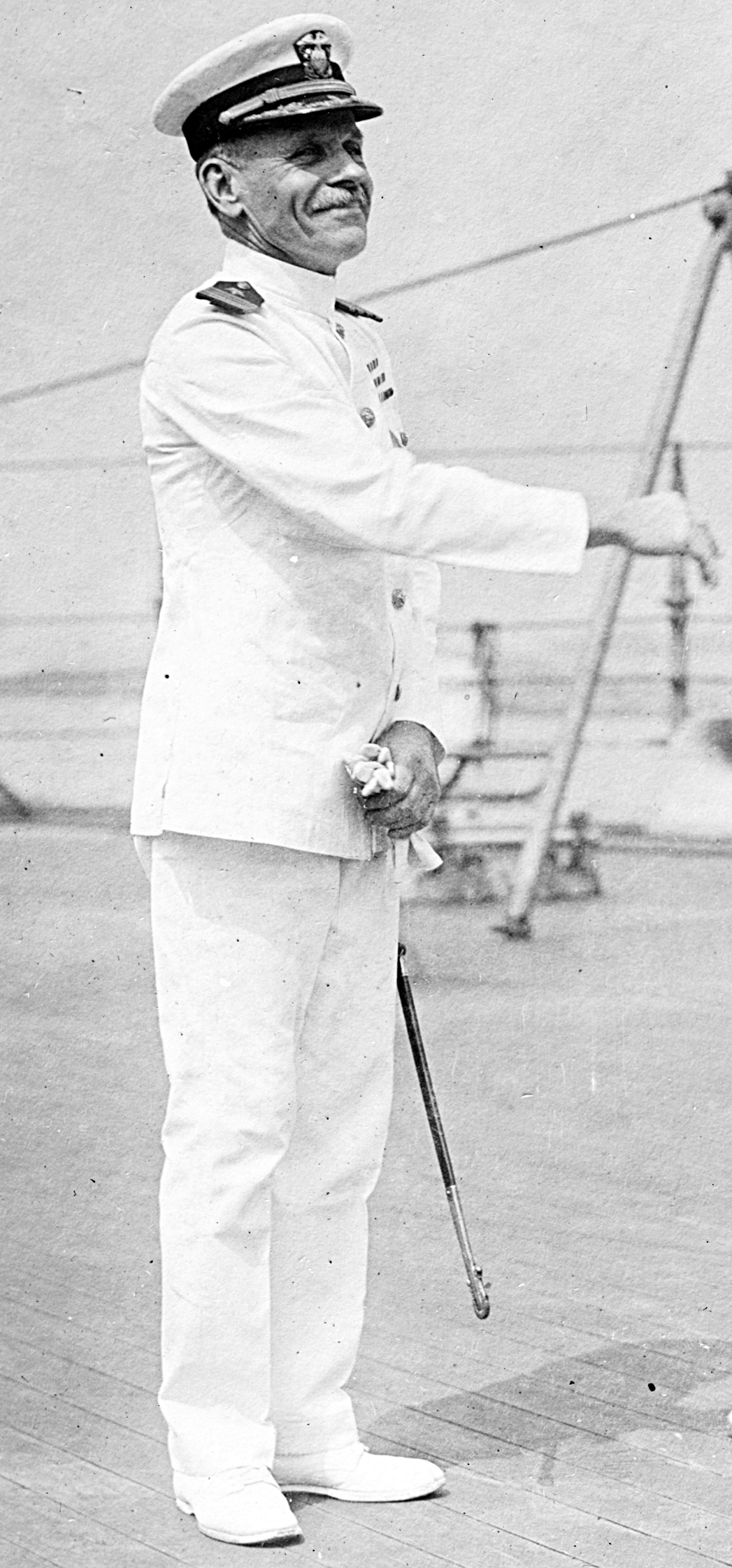
Martin Edward Trench

Martin Edward Trench (November 30, 1869 – January 6, 1927) was a Captain of the United States Navy and Governor of the United States Virgin Islands from 1925 until his death in 1927. He is the first Governor of the territory to have died while in office. His service in the navy included active duty during the Spanish–American War and World War I.

== Early life and naval career ==
Born the son of an immigrant farmer from Ireland in Dennison, Minnesota in November 1869. He entered the United States Naval Academy in 1889 and captained their football team. Trench graduated from the academy in 1893. He was appointed to the engineering division at the New York Navy Yard in 1895 and afterwards served aboard the battleship Maine. He left the Maine shortly before she exploded and sank in harbour at Havana, an incident that led to the Spanish–American War in which Trench served aboard the auxiliary cruiser Resolute.

In 1912 Trench served with the Bureau of Navigation and afterwards commanded in turn the protected cruiser Denver, the armored cruiser Colorado and the protected cruiser St. Louis. Afterwards he became assistant superintendent of the gun factory at Washington Navy Yard.

During World War I, he commanded USS Charleston. For most of the US involvement in the war he commanded the Naval Torpedo Station for which duty he won the Navy Cross for meritorious service. He afterwards commanded naval facilities in Washington, Philadelphia and Charleston.

== Governor ==
Trench was selected by US President Calvin Coolidge to become Governor of the United States Virgin Islands following the end of Philip Williams's term. He was sworn in on September 11, 1925. Trench accepted the post on the insistence that the usual 2-year tenure be waived to allow him to see through major reforms and development projects.

During his tenure he agreed to sponsor the visit of musician Maud Cuney Hare to the islands to give concerts, arranged by bandmaster Alton Adams. He died of pneumonia in Worcester, Massachusetts on January 6, 1927 while spending the holidays with his friend Rear Admiral Ralph Earle. A memorial service was held for Trench at the Emancipation Garden in Saint Thomas, U.S. Virgin Islands on January 8. He is buried in Arlington National Cemetery outside of Washington, DC. After his death a request Trench had made for $100,000 of government funding for highways improvements on the Virgin Islands was passed by Congress in a bill introduced by Hiram Bingham III. He had also set in motion measures to provide for a permanent system of government to replace the naval administration and for imrpoving the edcuational system.

Preceded by Philip Williams	Governor of the U.S. Virgin Islands; 1925–1927	Succeeded by Waldo A. Evans
