= Sunny Isle, U.S. Virgin Islands =

Coordinates: 17°43′37″N 64°44′55″W

Sunny Isle, United States Virgin Islands
- Village
- Interactive map of Sunny Isle, United States Virgin Islands
- Country: United States Virgin Islands
- Island: Saint Croix
- Time zone: UTC-4 (AST)

Sunny Isle is a shopping center at Sion Farm on the island of Saint Croix in the United States Virgin Islands.
