= 1964 United States Virgin Islands general election =

1964 United States Virgin Islands legislative election
- November 3, 1964

All 11 seats in the Legislature of the Virgin Islands
| | Majority party |
|---|---|
| Leader | Earle B. Ottley |
| Party | Nonpartisan |
| Leader since | 1963 |
| Leader's seat | At-large |
| Total seats | 11 seats |
| Total votes | 39,325 |
President before election
Earle B. Ottley
Nonpartisan
Elected President
Earle B. Ottley
Nonpartisan

The 1964 United States Virgin Islands legislative election was held on Tuesday, November 3, 1964, to elect members of the 6th Virgin Islands Legislature.

11 senators were elected, who elected incumbent Earle B. Ottley as president.

== Results by district ==
=== At-large district ===
1964 United States Virgin Islands legislative election (at-large district)
| Party | Candidate | Votes | % |
|---|---|---|---|
| Nonpartisan | Ronald De Lugo | 3,261 | 16.04% |
| Nonpartisan | Earle B. Ottley | 2,855 | 14.04% |
| Nonpartisan | John L. Maduro | 2,769 | 13.62% |
| Nonpartisan | Bertha C. Boschlute | 2,724 | 13.40% |
| Nonpartisan | Randall N. James | 2,714 | 13.35% |
| Nonpartisan | Aureo Diaz | 2,567 | 12.63% |
| Nonpartisan | Alfred Lockhart | 2,328 | 11.45% |
| Nonpartisan | Charles Senf | 323 | 1.59% |
| Nonpartisan | Valdemar Hill | 278 | 1.37% |
| Nonpartisan | Nora B. Amritt | 219 | 1.08% |
| Nonpartisan | Heriberto Capo | 117 | 0.58% |
| Nonpartisan | Sofia B. Squiabro | 110 | 0.54% |
| Nonpartisan | Faith Dane Johnson | 42 | 0.21% |
| Write-in | | 25 | 0.12% |
| Total votes | | 20,332 | 100% |

=== St. Thomas ===
1964 United States Virgin Islands legislative election (St. Thomas)
| Party | Candidate | Votes | % |
|---|---|---|---|
| Nonpartisan | Percival H. Reese | 3,560 | 38.00% |
| Nonpartisan | A. David Puritz | 3,518 | 37.55% |
| Nonpartisan | Lionel Hilaire | 1,403 | 14.98% |
| Nonpartisan | Thyra Hodge Williams | 638 | 6.81% |
| Nonpartisan | Juan Davila Lugo | 114 | 1.22% |
| Nonpartisan | Alejandro E. Ortiz | 111 | 1.19% |
| Write-in | | 24 | 0.26% |
| Total votes | | 9,368 | 100% |

=== St. Croix ===
1964 United States Virgin Islands legislative election (St. Croix)
| Party | Candidate | Votes | % |
|---|---|---|---|
| Nonpartisan | Augustin Doward | 2,674 | 28.77% |
| Nonpartisan | Fritz E. Lawaetz | 2,615 | 28.14% |
| Nonpartisan | Patrick N. Williams | 1,867 | 20.09% |
| Nonpartisan | Juan Belardo | 1,789 | 19.25% |
| Nonpartisan | Nemecio Camacho | 128 | 1.38% |
| Nonpartisan | John J. Farchette | 101 | 1.09% |
| Nonpartisan | Erle R. Williams | 76 | 0.82% |
| Nonpartisan | Lucia G. Santiago | 27 | 0.29% |
| Nonpartisan | Anastacio Vegas | 16 | 0.17% |
| Write-in | | 0 | 0% |
| Total votes | | 9,293 | 100% |

=== St. John ===
1964 United States Virgin Islands legislative election (St. John)
| Party | Candidate | Votes | % |
|---|---|---|---|
| Nonpartisan | Theovald Moorehead | 210 | 63.25% |
| Nonpartisan | Cleone H. Sewer | 103 | 31.02% |
| Nonpartisan | George Starling | 19 | 5.73% |
| Nonpartisan | Viciente Oquendo | 0 | 0% |
| Write-in | | 0 | 0% |
| Total votes | | 332 | 100% |
