= 1962 United States Virgin Islands general election =

1970 United States Virgin Islands legislative election
- November 6, 1962

All 11 seats in the Legislature of the Virgin Islands
Leader	Walter I.M. Hodge (defeated)
Leader since	1959
President before election
Walter I.M. Hodge
Elected President
Earle B. Ottley

The 1962 United States Virgin Islands general election was held on November 6, 1962, to elect members of the 5th Virgin Islands Legislature. As this was before the 1966 Amending Act, no gubernatorial election took place. The Unity Party, a party with no national affiliate, won a majority in the chamber. Shortly after the beginning of the session, the Unity party changed their name to the Unity-Democratic party. Earle B. Ottley was elected president in the legislative session.

== Results ==
=== At-large district ===
1962 United States Virgin Islands legislative election (At-large district)
Candidate	Votes
✓ Ron De Lugo	2,722
✓ Lucina Millin	2,290
✓ Earle Ottley	2,075
✓ John Maduro	2,008
✓ Randall James	1,561
✓ Pat Williams	1,446
Walter I.M. Hodge	1,077
Aureo Diaz	1,013
Candido R. Guadeloupe	581
Leon A. Mawson	519
Nora B. Amritt	176
Max Jacobs	138
Heriberto Capo	127
Cruz Santana	118

=== St. John district ===
1962 United States Virgin Islands legislative election (St. John district)
Candidate	Votes
✓ T. Moorehead	224
Julius Sprauve (write-in)	29

=== St. Thomas district ===
1962 United States Virgin Islands legislative election (St. Thomas district)
Candidate	Votes
✓ Hugo Reese	2,708
✓ David Puritz	2,541
Anthony Cerge	1,180
Alfred Lockhart	1,144
Pedro Camacho	178

=== St. Croix district ===
1962 United States Virgin Islands legislative election (St. Thomas district)
Candidate	Votes
✓ A. Doward	2,010
✓ Fritz Lawaetz	1,769
Aubrey A. Anduze	1,143
Angel Suarez	644
Erle Williams	120
Luis McBean	74
Clarence H. Ussery	70
