= Alexander Moorhead =

American Virgin Islander politician

Member of the Virgin Islands Legislature
- In office 1971–1976

Personal details
- Born: June 7, 1945 Saint Croix, U.S. Virgin Islands
- Died: March 24, 2023 (aged 77) Frederiksted, U.S. Virgin Islands, U.S.
- Education: Moravian College; Harvard Kennedy School

Alexander Moorhead (June 7, 1945 – March 24, 2023) was an American Virgin Islander politician. He served a member of the Legislature of the Virgin Islands from 1971 to 1976.
