= 1966 United States Virgin Islands general election =

1964 United States Virgin Islands legislative election
- November 8, 1966

All 15 seats in the Legislature of the Virgin Islands
	Majority party
Leader	Earle B. Ottley
Party	Nonpartisan
Leader since	1963
Leader's seat	At-large
Total seats	15 seats
Total votes	117,971
President before election
Earle B. Ottley
Nonpartisan
Elected President
Earle B. Ottley
Nonpartisan

The 1966 United States Virgin Islands legislative election was held on Tuesday, November 8, 1966, to elect members of the 7th Virgin Islands Legislature. Voters were allowed to choose multiple candidates per district.

The 1966 Amending Act set the number of senators to fifteen, and set the number of senators elected per district as follows:

- Four elected at-large
- Five from Saint Thomas
- Five from Saint Croix
- One from Saint John

The senators elected incumbent Earle B. Ottley as president.

== Results by district ==
=== At-large district ===
1966 United States Virgin Islands legislative election (at-large district)
Party	Candidate	Votes	%
Nonpartisan	Alexander A. Farrelly	7,324	13.73%
Nonpartisan	Earle B. Ottley (incumbent)	7,138	13.38%
Nonpartisan	Randall N. James (incumbent)	6,894	12.93%
Nonpartisan	Aureo Diaz-Morales (incumbent)	6,646	12.46%
Nonpartisan	Ronald De Lugo (incumbent)	6,544	12.27%
Nonpartisan	Bertha C. Boschulte (incumbent)	6,513	12.21%
Nonpartisan	Omar Brown	6,249	11.72%
Nonpartisan	Leonard Stein	6,019	11.29%
Write-in		9	0.02%
Total votes		53,336	100%

=== St. Thomas ===
1966 United States Virgin Islands legislative election (St. Thomas)
Party	Candidate	Votes	%
Nonpartisan	John L. Maduro (incumbent)	4,492	13.37%
Nonpartisan	Horace A. Callwood	4,391	13.07%
Nonpartisan	Percival H. Reese (incumbent)	4,455	13.26%
Nonpartisan	David Puritz (incumbent)	4,453	13.26%
Nonpartisan	Kenneth D. Alexander	4,315	12.85%
Nonpartisan	Arturo Soto	2,372	7.06%
Nonpartisan	Alvin O. Canton	2,196	6.54%
Nonpartisan	Maldred J. Shackleton	2,169	6.46%
Nonpartisan	Rodney V. Penha	2,154	6.41%
Nonpartisan	Lionel Helaire	2,143	6.38%
Nonpartisan	Ailen Grammer	437	1.30%
Write-in		10	0.03%
Total votes		33,587	100%

=== St. Croix ===
1966 United States Virgin Islands legislative election (St. Croix)
Party	Candidate	Votes	%
Nonpartisan	Frits E. Lawaetz (incumbent)	3,839	12.52%
Nonpartisan	Augustin Doward (incumbent)	3,803	12.40%
Nonpartisan	David Hamilton	3,636	11.86%
Nonpartisan	Santiago Garcia	3,585	11.69%
Nonpartisan	Frank E. Jacobs	3,585	11.69%
Nonpartisan	Walter I.M. Hodge	2,519	8.22%
Nonpartisan	Robert P. Cramer	2,487	8.11%
Nonpartisan	Patrick N. Williams	2,462	8.03%
Nonpartisan	Annie De Chabert	2,406	7.85%
Nonpartisan	Angel M. Morales	2,337	7.62%
Write-in		5	0.02%
Total votes		30,664	100%

=== St. John ===
1966 United States Virgin Islands legislative election (St. John)
Party	Candidate	Votes	%
Nonpartisan	Theovald Moorehead (incumbent)	270	70.31%
Nonpartisan	Mary B. Innis	114	29.69%
Write-in		0	0%
Total votes		384	100%
