= Philip Williams (United States Navy) =

Philip Williams (1869 – October 31, 1942) was a decorated Captain of the United States Navy and one-time military Governor of the United States Virgin Islands.

Williams entered the United States Naval Academy in 1889, became an Ensign in 1891, a lieutenant junior grade in 1894, and a lieutenant in 1897. He served in the Spanish–American War and commanded USS Chester during World War I, for which he received the Navy Cross. In 1919, he was given command of USS Kansas, before being reassigned to the Bureau of Navigation. From 1922 to 1924, he commanded USS Tennessee, before being appointed as Governor of the United States Virgin Islands.

== Time as governor ==
During his turn as governor, the previous governments of the islands were criticized for not doing enough to fortify the islands as a military base. Political pressure was also mounting as the Colonial Council, the local government body, voted to request greater authority over the islands but were denied. (The rationale being that they did not suffer from "taxation without representation" because the amount paid in taxes by the Islanders were less than the amount of support received yearly from the Federal government.)

On August 28, 1924, a hurricane swept through the islands, resulting in four deaths and one person still missing, all on St. John. In addition, 300–400 houses were destroyed and the American Red Cross sent $5,000 (approximately $90,000 in 2024) in aid. The nearby British island of Tortola suffered many more casualties and resources were dispatched from the US Virgin Islands to assist.

Williams resigned as Governor due to health problems in 1926 and retired from the Navy in 1927. Following his retirement, he continued to work with the Navy and authored several textbooks using in the academy.

Preceded by Henry Hughes Hough	Governor of the U.S. Virgin Islands; 1923–26	Succeeded by Martin Edwin Trench
