= Gregory Francis =

United States Virgin Islands politician

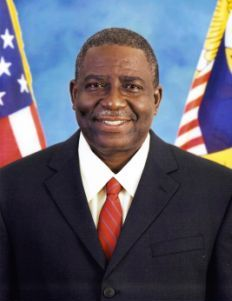
- Official portrait, 2007

10th Lieutenant Governor of the United States Virgin Islands
- In office January 1, 2007 – January 5, 2015
- Governor: John de Jongh
- Preceded by: Vargrave Richards
- Succeeded by: Osbert Potter

Personal details
- Born: August 30, 1951 (age 75) Saint Croix, United States Virgin Islands
- Party: Democratic
- Spouse: Cheryl Francis
- Children: 4
- Education: University of the Virgin Islands

Gregory R. Francis (born August 30, 1951 in Saint Croix) is an American politician. A Democrat, he served as tenth lieutenant governor of the United States Virgin Islands from January 1, 2007 to January 5, 2015, having been elected on a ticket with Governor John de Jongh.

== Biography ==
=== Early life ===
Gregory Francis was born in Saint Croix on August 30, 1951, to Olric Francis and Hyacinth Wilson-Francis. He is one of seven siblings, the others of whom are Olrick, Herbert, Kathleen, Howard, Milton, Kenneth, and Arthur.

Francis attended Christiansted Grammar School, Christiansted High School and Saint Croix Central High School. He received a paralegal certificate from the University of the Virgin Islands in 1984 while serving in the United States Army.

=== Military career ===
Francis moved to New York City after graduation from high school, where he planned to attend a trade school. However, because of a one-year residency requirement for the school, Francis enlisted in the United States Army instead.

Francis would spend 27 years in the Army. He served as a Command Program Support Specialist, Supervisory Military Personal Specialist and a Recruiting and Retention Manager. He was stationed in Germany, Puerto Rico and the U.S. Virgin Islands during his military career.

Political offices
| Preceded by Vargrave Richards | Lieutenant Governor of the United States Virgin Islands; 2007–2015 | Succeeded by Osbert Potter |
