= Charles Wesley Turnbull =

United States Virgin Islands politician (1935–2022)

Charles Turnbull
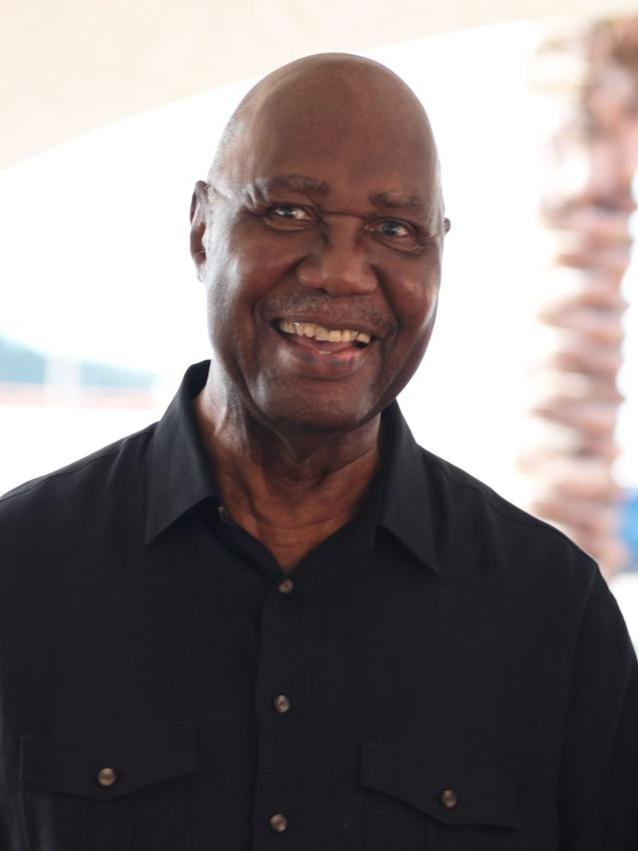
- Turnbull in 2019

6th Governor of the United States Virgin Islands
- In office January 4, 1999 – January 1, 2007
- Lieutenant: Gerard Luz James; Vargrave Richards
- Preceded by: Roy Schneider
- Succeeded by: John de Jongh

Commissioner of the Virgin Islands Department of Education
- In office 1979–1987
- Governor: Juan Francisco Luis
- Succeeded by: Linda Creque

Personal details
- Born: Charles Wesley Turnbull; February 5, 1935 St. Thomas, U.S.Virgin Islands
- Died: July 3, 2022 (aged 87) Washington, D.C., U.S.
- Party: Democratic
- Education: Hampton University (BA, MA); University of Minnesota, Twin Cities (PhD)

Charles Wesley Turnbull (February 5, 1935 – July 3, 2022) was a U.S. Virgin Islands politician, educator and historian who served as the sixth governor of the United States Virgin Islands from 1999 to 2007.

== Biography ==
Charles Wesley Turnbull was born on February 6, 1935, in the island of St. Thomas to John Wesley Turnbull and Ruth Ann Eliza Skelton of Tortola. Prior to being elected governor in 1998, he was a professor at the University of the Virgin Islands, Commissioner and Assistant Commissioner of the territorial Department of Education, principal and assistant principal of Charlotte Amalie High School, and a teacher in elementary and secondary schools. He was a graduate of Hampton University, earning bachelor's and master's degrees. He earned a doctoral degree in Educational Administration from the University of Minnesota in 1976.

During his tenure as governor, Turnbull served as a member of the National Governors Association, the Southern Governors' Association, and the Democratic Governors Association.

Turnbull was prohibited from seeking re-election in 2006 due to term limits. His term of office expired on January 1, 2007, and he was succeeded by John de Jongh. Turnbull served as a member of the Virgin Islands Fifth Constitutional Convention.

== Post-gubernatorial career ==
In 2011, the 29th Legislature passed a resolution naming the Estate Tutu Regional Library on St. Thomas after him. Turnbull was awarded with the Virgin Islands Medal of Honor.

From 2015 to 2017, Turnbull served as a member of the Centennial Commission.

== Personal life ==
Turnbull died from a brief illness in Washington, D.C., on July 3, 2022, at the age of 87.

Party political offices
Preceded by Derek Hodge	Democratic nominee for Governor of the United States Virgin Islands; 1998, 2002	Succeeded by John de Jongh
Political offices
Preceded by Roy Schneider	Governor of the United States Virgin Islands; 1999–2007	Succeeded by John de Jongh
