= Vargrave Richards =

U.S. Virgin Islands politician

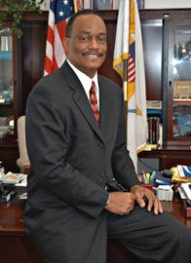

9th Lieutenant Governor of the United States Virgin Islands
- In office January 6, 2003 – January 1, 2007
- Governor: Charles Wesley Turnbull
- Preceded by: Gerard Luz James
- Succeeded by: Gregory Francis

Personal details
- Born: September 16, 1950 (age 75) San Juan, Puerto Rico
- Party: Democratic
- Profession: Politician, teacher

Vargrave A. Richards (born September 16, 1950, in San Juan, Puerto Rico) is a U.S. Virgin Islands politician and educator. Richards served as the ninth lieutenant governor of the United States Virgin Islands from 2003 until 2007 during the second term of Democratic Governor Charles Turnbull.

== Early life ==
Richards is a former teacher. Richards attended the College of the Virgin Islands, now known as the University of the Virgin Islands, and was a part-time student at Antioch University from 1969 until 1973. Vargrave does not hold a bachelor's degree.

== Political career ==
Vargrave Richards served as a Democratic Senator from Saint Croix for four terms in the Legislature of the Virgin Islands. He served as the President of the Senate during the 23rd Legislature, which met from 1999 until 2000.

== Lieutenant governor ==
Democratic Governor Charles Wesley Turnbull had a very strained relationship with Lieutenant Governor Gerard Luz James during his first term in office. During the 2002 gubernatorial election, James challenged Turnbull for governor, so Turnbull needed a new running mate for lieutenant governor if he chose to run for a second term.

On June 18, 2002, Turnbull ended speculation by announcing that he would seek re-election as governor at a rally at Gertrude's Restaurant on Saint Croix. Turnbull chose Vargrave Richards as his running mate for lieutenant governor. The Turnbull-Richards ticket defeated James in the Democratic primary election and won the general gubernatorial election in the fall, which gave Turnbull a second term as governor.

Governor Turnbull and Lt. Governor Vargrave Richards were inaugurated into office on January 6, 2003.

=== 2006 gubernatorial candidacy ===
Incumbent Governor Charles Turnbull could not seek a third term in the 2006 gubernatorial election due to term limits. Vargrave Richards, who was serving as the Lt. Governor of the U.S. Virgin Islands at the time, announced that he would run for governor in 2006 as a Democrat. Richards chose Roy Jackson, a certified public accountant, as his running mate.

Richards was defeated in the Democratic gubernatorial primary election by businessman John de Jongh. De Jongh received 7,041 votes (52.28%), while Richards came in second with 3,894 votes (28.91%). The gubernatorial ticket of Edgar Ross and Lorraine Berry came in third with 2,524 votes.

Political offices
Preceded by Gerard Luz James	Lieutenant Governor of the United States Virgin Islands; 2003–2007	Succeeded by Gregory Francis
