= Lorraine Berry =

US Virgin Islands politician

Lorraine Berry (November 15, 1949 – July 19, 2010) was a 12-term senator and 2-term Senate President of the United States Virgin Islands Legislature of the Virgin Islands.

== Personal life ==
Lorraine Berry was born on November 15, 1949, on the island of Saint Thomas. She attended Sts. Peter & Paul School and the University of the Virgin Islands.

She was an active part of the local French community for many years, for which she was awarded the Ordre national du Mérite.

She died of colon cancer on July 19, 2010, at the Schneider Medical Center in Charlotte Amalie.

== Career ==
Berry's early political experience included being PTA president, working in the Finance department, and working for the then Delegate to Congress Ron de Lugo.

She joined the Legislature as a Democrat following the 1982 election and retired in 2007. During her 12 terms, Berry drafted about 400 pieces of legislation and chaired eight committees. She was one of only two women Senate Presidents and the only person to serve as Senate President twice.

Her achievements include earmarking fundings for the Charlotte Kimelman Cancer Institute and the Virgin Islands Cardiac Center and spearheading legislation to allow government employees to donate their sick leave hours to their colleagues. She is also known for starting the Symposium (formerly: the Women's Symposium) following Hurricane Marilyn. Outside of her legislative career, Berry was a gubernatorial candidate at the 1986 Democratic primary and a lieutenant gubernatorial candidate at the 2006 Democratic primary for the Virgin Islands.

She unsuccessfully ran for lieutenant governor in 2006.

== Awards and honors ==
In the late 2000s, Berry was named Knight of the National Order of Merit. For hall of fames, Berry was inducted into the Virgin Islands Women's Hall of Fame in 2007.

== Legacy ==
The Lorraine L. Berry Legislative Annex was named in her honor in 2013.

== Personal life ==
Berry was married with two children.
