= Adelbert Bryan =

US Virgin Islands politician and senator

Bert Bryan

Personal details
- Born: August 21, 1943 (age 83) Frederiksted, Saint Croix, U.S.V.I.
- Party: Independent Citizens Movement

Adelbert M. "Bert" Bryan (born August 21, 1943) is a U.S. Virgin Islands politician and former senator.

== Political career ==
Adelbert Bryan served as Frederiksted police commander. In 1989, he received 35 percent of the vote for USVI Governor. Bryan has also served as Senator and on the Board of Education.

== Personal life ==
In 1989, Bryan was charged with looting after Hurricane Hugo.

In 1996, Bryan shot and killed his son, Pell. Law enforcement called the shooting "an act of self-defense" while political rival Alden Alicia Pickering has claimed that it was murder.

In 2001, Bryan's 25-year-old son, Kaunda, was shot and killed in St. Croix.
