= 35th Virgin Islands Legislature =

Virgin Islands legislative session

35th Legislature of the Virgin Islands

Leadership
- President: Novelle Francis (D)
- Vice President: Marvin Blyden (D)
- Majority Leader: Kenneth Gittens (D)
- Minority Leader: Dwayne DeGraff (I)

Structure
- Seats: 15
- Length of term: 2 years

The 35th Virgin Islands Legislature was a meeting of the Legislature of the Virgin Islands. It convened in Charlotte Amalie on January 9, 2023, and adjourned on December 19, 2024, during the first two years of Governor Albert Bryan second term.

In the 2022 election, the Democratic Party of the Virgin Islands expanded their majority by gaining one seat which was led by Independent Senator Janelle Sarauw, who instead ran for lieutenant governor.

== Major events ==
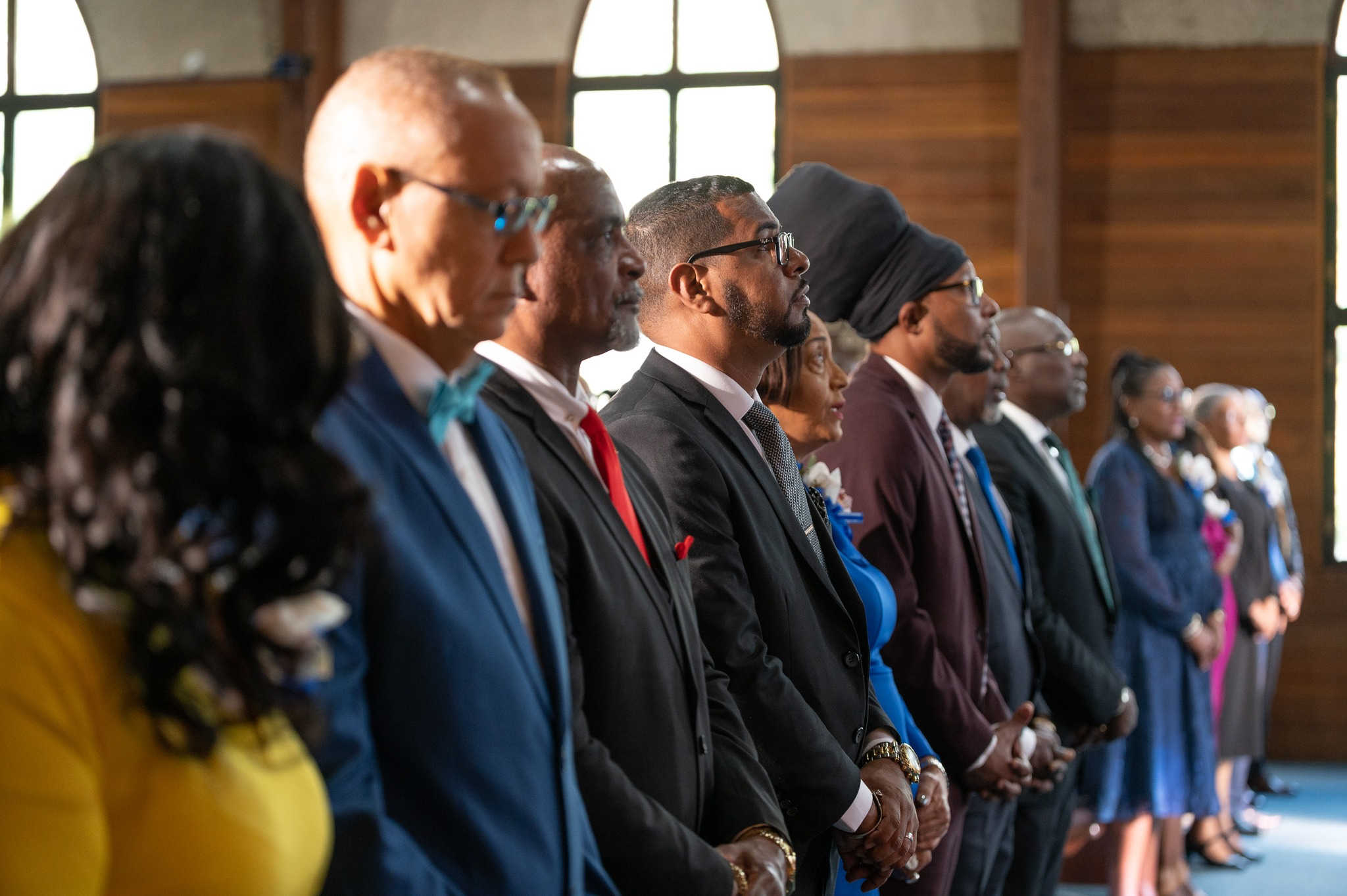
Members-elect of the 35th Legislature attend church service before sworn in ceremony.

- January 9, 2023: Members-elect of the 36th Legislature are sworn-in at Emancipation Gardens on St. Thomas. 12 p.m. EST: The 35th Legislature convenes into session. Novelle Francis succeeds Donna Frett-Gregory as Senate President.
- January 23, 2023: Governor Bryan delivered his Fifth State of the Territory Address.
- April 14, 2023: Senate confirmed acting Attorney General Carol Thomas-Jacobs to the United States Virgin Islands Superior Court.
- April 14, 2023: Senate voted to adopt Juneteenth making the Virgin Islands, the first US territory to recognize the federal holiday.
- June 14, 2023: Senate voted to confirm Ariel Smith as the new Attorney General of the Virgin Islands.
- July 20, 2023: Senate voted to confirm the nomination of Lisa M. Alejandro to be Commissioner of Department of Property and Procurement.
- September 15, 2023: Senate held vote on land swap deal with nine out 15 senators approving it for the purpose to construct a K-12 school on St. John.
- September 20, 2023: Senate President Novelle Francis express concerns over the appointment of Finance Commissioner Nominee Kevin McCurdy as acting governor while Bryan and Lt. Governor Roach leave the territory.
- September 22, 2023: Senate confirmed Lionel E. Selwood to the Virgin Islands Water and Power Authority Board of Directors and Angel Dawson Jr. as Administrator of the Government Employees Retirement System.
- October 19, 2023: Former Senator Alicia “Chucky” Hansen lies in state at Legislature Building on St. Croix.
- November 2, 2023: Senators attend funeral of Former Senator Lloyd Williams on St. Thomas.
- December 19, 2023: Senate voted overwhelmingly to confirm Natalie Hodge as Commissioner of Department of Licensing & Customer Affairs, Louis Petersen as Agriculture Commissioner, Kevin McCurdy as Commissioner of Finance, Dr. Bert Petersen and Donna Christensen to the UVI Board of Trustees.
- January 22, 2024: Governor Bryan delivered his sixth State of the Territory Address.
- March 25, 2024: Senate voted to confirm the nominations of Harold Willocks for Supreme Court justice, Averil George as Commissioner of Human Services and Antonio Stevens as Director of Fire & EMS.
- April 23, 2024: Senators holds press conference to address Bryan's emergency declaration on WAPA and its financial conditions.
- April 25, 2024: Senate convenes special session to provide funding for WAPA.
- June 18, 2024: Senators Gittens, Blyden and Carrion express concerns over alleged corruption within Bryan administration amid FBI probe.
- July 23, 2024: Senate confirmed Magistrate Judge Ernest E. Morris Jr. to the United States Virgin Islands Superior Court.
- September 27, 2024: Senate voted to confirm the nomination of Gordon Rhea for Attorney General.
- December 12, 2024: Senators attend grand opening of Walter I.M. Hodge Pavilion on St. Croix.

== Major Legislation ==
=== Enacted ===
- February 2, 2023: Act 8700 (Bill No. 35-0003): An Act appropriating $2.2 million for the adoption of various portions of the Virgin Islands Agricultural Plan. (introduced by Sen. Donna Frett-Gregory)
- April 20, 2023: Act 8701 (Bill No. 35-0070): An Act authorizing the Governor to utilize monies from public funds of the Virgin Islands to create working capital, to engage in a line of credit in the maximum amount of $100 million to provide for the disbursement of funds needed to advance disaster-related recovery projects that are reimbursable through federal funding and other disaster-related projects and provide funding to advance payment of the $45,000,000 towards the buyout of the infrastructure agreement between WAPA and VITOL and the acquisition of the LPG facilities and to issue the Series 2023 Notes. (introduced by Sen. Novelle Francis)
- April 25, 2023: Act 8702 (Bill No. 35-0006): An Act honoring and commending former Senator George E. Goodwin, by naming the Cricket field in Estate Nazareth, St. Thomas after him while awarding him the Virgin Islands Medal of Honor. (introduced by Sen. Carla J. Joseph) Act 8703 (Bill No. 35-0007): An Act honoring and commending Mr. Boyd "Boyzie" Orlanzo Todman for his many contributions to the people and the youth of the Virgin Islands and to name the basketball court at Oswald Harris Court "The Boyd "Boyzie" Orlanzo Todman Basketball Court". Act 8704 (Bill No. 35-0009): enacts The Juneteenth National Independence Day Act to make June 19, a legal holiday in the Virgin Islands. (introduced by Sen. Marvin Blyden, Alma Francis-Heyliger, Milton Potter) Act 8705 (Bill No. 35-0010): An Act honoring and commending Mr. Aloy “Wenty” Nielsen for his years of service to the Virgin Islands community and naming the Christiansted Bypass in his honor; making a $10,000 appropriation from the General Fund for signage at Aloy Nielsen Bypass. Act 8706 (Bill No. 35-0011): An Act honoring and commending former Senator Horace A. Caliwood, Sr. posthumously for his dedication, service, and commitment to the people of the Virgin Islands and naming the north–south street immediately east of Windward Passage in his memory. Act 8714 (Bill No. 35-0026): An Act amending title 22 Virgin Islands Code relating to insurers becoming members of a Federal Home Loan Bank. Act 8716 (Bill No. 35-0049): An Act amending title 7, chapter 1, of the Virgin Islands Code by adding subchapter VIII, establishing a Local Food and Farm Council in accordance with mandate five of the Virgin Islands Agricultural Plan. Act 8719 (Bill No. 35-0063): An Act approving the conveyance by the Port Authority to the UVI of Tract E, Parcel 72 Estate Lindbergh Bay, 4A Southside Quarter, St. Thomas, Virgin Islands, in exchange for the University of the Virgin Islands’ conveyance to the Virgin Islands Port Authority of Parcel 66-5 Estate Lindberg Bay St. Thomas, Virgin Islands. Act 8720 (Bill No. 35-0068): An Act authorizing the members of the Board of Medical Examiners to serve temporarily as de facto board members of boards established under title 3 Virgin Islands Code, section 415 if a board does not have enough members to establish a quorum. Act 8721 (Bill No. 35-0072): An Act ratifying the Governor's approval of Major Coastal Zone Management Permit No. CZT-03-20 (L&W) issued to SVB 155 SPRING LLC, D/B/A Independent Boatyard and Marina. Act 8722 (Bill No. 35-0054): An Act amending title 1 Virgin Islands Code, chapter 7, section 103b, relating to the Centennial Treasures Award, to provide for a single, lumpsum award payment.
- June 14, 2023: Act 8730 (Bill No. 35-0055): An Act amending title 17 of the Virgin Islands Code pertaining to school curriculum in elementary and secondary schools. Act No. 8731 (Bill No. 35-0061): An Act directing the Virgin Islands Inspector General to conduct an audit of WAPA; making a $250,000 appropriation to conduct the audit; and for other related purposes (governor’s veto overridden by Legislature)
- June 21, 2023: Act 8732 (Bill No. 35-0012): An Act amending title 23 Virgin Islands Code, chapter 19, subchapter III, section 1556 relating to increasing the retirement pension for National Guard retirees.
- June 27, 2023: Act 8728 (Bill No. 35-0105): An Act ratifying the Governor's approval of Minor Coastal Zone Permit CZT-12-16W issued to Emerald Beach Corporation d/b/a Emerald Beach Hotel for a term of 20 years for the installation, use, and occupancy of submerged land by three swim buoys, an Aquabana and a floating dinghy dock seaward of Parcel Nos. 70-D-1 and 70-T-1, Estate Lindbergh Bay, St. Thomas, Virgin Islands. Act 8729 (Bill No. 35-0106): An Act appropriating $700,000 from the Genera] Fund of the Virgin Islands to the Department of Health for the Caribbean Kidney Center for the purpose of hiring dialysis nurses and other staff.
- July 24, 2023: Act 8739 (Bill No. 35-0029): An Act honoring and commending Donna Marie Christian-Christiansen M.D., for her tireless contributions to the people of the Virgin Islands in the medical field and representation in the United States Congress.
- August 1, 2023: Act 8733 (Bill No. 35-0033): An Act honoring and commending Mr. Benburin “Benny” Stephens posthumously for his heroism in saving the lives of a mother and her children and to rename the Bovoni Road (Route 30), specifically from the entrance of the St. Thomas Abattoir to the entrance of the Bertha C. Boschulte Middle School, “The Benburin “Benny” Stephens Drive”. Act 8734: An Act amending title 20 Virgin Islands Code, part II, chapter 39, section 436(b), by expanding the definition of “disabled veteran” for the purposes of eligibility for a disabled window decal, making various appropriations and amending Act 8681. Act No. 8735: An Act amending title 3 Virgin Islands Code. chapter 16, section 274, subsection (f), paragraph (II) to clarify the duties and responsibilities of the executive director of the Taxicab Commission. Act No. 8736: An Act awarding the Virgin Islands Medal of Honor posthumously to former Senator Edgar Milton lies for his commendable public service and contributions to the people of the Virgin Islands. Act No. 8738 (Bill No. 35-0114): : A resolution honoring and commending the 2023 Central American and Caribbean Games’ Gold Medal Winners.
- August 18, 2023: Act 8737 (Bill No. 35-0101): A resolution honoring and commending Dr. Olaf “Bronco” Hendricks for his tireless years of remarkable and invaluable contributions to the people of the Virgin Islands in the field of psychiatry, his advocacy for social justice for individuals with behavioral health and substance use issues, and for his music.
- September 29, 2023: St. John Land Exchange Act
- October 4, 2023: Act 8772 (Bill No. 35-0073): An Act amending title 32 Virgin Islands Code, chapter 11 by setting forth the duties and responsibilities of the Virgin Islands Horse Racing Commission, establishing a horse racing commission for the St. Croix district and one for the St. Thomas and St. John district, and amending the chapter to reflect the responsibilities of each horse racing commission. Act 8773: An Act amending title 32 of the Virgin Islands Code, chapter 11, subchapter I, section 201 to establish separate horse racing commissions for each district and making provision for a temporary commission. Act No. 8774: An Act approving the Lease Agreement between the Government of the Virgin Islands, acting through its Commissioner of the Department of Property and Procurement, and Dave Jeffers d/b/a Dave Trucking Service for Parcel No. 142-B Estate Anna's Retreat, No, I New Quarter, St. Thomas, Virgin Islands, consisting of approximately 6,627.393 U.S. sq. ft. or 0.144 U.S. acre zoned “P” as shown on O.L.G. File No. D9-8646-T012. to be used for the purpose of operating the general offices of the trucking company and for other related purposes. Act No. 8775: An Act approving the lease agreement between the Government of the Virgin Islands, acting through its Commissioner of the Department of Property and Procurement and Demah, Inc. d/b/a Moe's Fresh Market, Revised Parcel No. 17-3 Remainder Estate Nisky, No. 6, Southside Quarter, St. Thomas and Unimproved Parcel No. 17-4 Estate Nisky, No. 6, Southside Quarter, St. Thomas, Virgin Islands, for operating a gourmet retail food market and store, butchery, importer of goods, restaurant, tobacco retailer, storage warehouse, and executive offices, executive and workforce suites, and for other related purposes.
- November 29, 2023: Act 8789: An Act honoring and commending former Senator Almando “Rocky” Liburd for his lifetime of service to the people of the Virgin Islands especially St. John, and renaming the North Shore Road on St. John “The Almando “Rocky” Liburd Highway”. Act No. 8785: An act amending title 3 Virgin Islands Code, chapter 27, section 719(b), requiring the Government Employees Retirement System to send each active member an annual report of contributions by U.S. mail or by electronic means, at the members option. Act No. 8786: An Act approving the lease agreement between GVI, acting through its Commissioner of the Department of Property and Procurement, and Inter Island Auto Group, LLC d/b/a VIP Quick Lube for Improved Parcel No. 70 Submarine Base, No. 6A Southside Quarter, St. Thomas, Virgin Islands, to be used as a new and used car dealership, repair shop, importer of goods, retail shops, store, and for other related purposes. Act 8782: An Act approving the Lease Agreement between the Government of the Virgin Islands, acting through the Commissioner of the Department of Property and Procurement, and Roncan, Inc. d/b/a Sand Castle on the Beach to lease Plot No. 128-B Two Brothers, Smithfield, and Hesselberg, West End Quarter and Plot No. 129 Two Brothers, Smithfield, and Hesselberg, West End Quarter, St. Croix, Virgin Islands.
- December 19, 2023: Act 8789: An Act posthumously honoring and commending Wayne “Facts Man” Adams for articulating and bringing events of historic significance to the people of the Virgin Islands, by naming Bridge to Nowhere on St. Thomas in his honor. (governor’s veto overridden by Legislature)
- January 20, 2024: Act 8790 (Bill No. 35-0013): An Act amending title 20 Virgin Islands Code, part II, chapter 35, relating to the issuance of limited local-purpose identification cards and operators’ licenses. Act 8792 (Bill No. 35-0084): An Act amending title 11, Virgin Islands Code, chapter 21, section 1213 to allow businesses operating under a trade name to have the option of renewing the trade name every 2, 6, or 10 years. Act 8793 (Bill No. 35-0086): An Act amending title 3 Virgin Islands Code, chapter 1, section 10h to require background checks for all information technology personnel and employees of the Bureau of Information Technology, agencies that have data centers, and any employee who handles classified information. Act 8794 (Bill No. 35-0099): An Act amending title 28, chapter 23, of the Virgin Islands Code relating to the foreclosure of Liens Upon Real Property. Act 8810: An Act honoring and commending Ralph A. deChabert, M.D. for outstanding contributions in the medical field to the people of the Virgin Islands and his many civic contributions to the community, especially to the island of St. Croix and to name the Labor and Delivery/Post Partum Unit “Maternity Services” at the Juan F. Luis Hospital and Medical Center North in his honor. Act 8811 (Bill No. 35-0109): A resolution honoring and commending the late Corporal Kendall Emanuel George by renaming portions of Highway 107 on St. John to the “Kendall Emanuel George Drive”. Act 8795 (Bill No. 35-0119): An Act amending title 19 Virgin Islands Code by adding a chapter 7A directing the Department of Health to develop and approve Mobile Integrated Healthcare Programs. Act 8812: An Act to commission and direct the Virgin Islands Council on the Arts to construct and erect a bronze bust of Dr. Alfred O. Heath to be placed next to those of Edith L. Williams, J. Antonio Jarvis and Rothschild Francis in Education Park on St. Thomas. Act 8813 (Bill No. 35-0125): An Act honoring and commending the late Police Lieutenant Melbourne Clarke posthumously for his dedication, service, and contributions to the Virgin Islands community in law enforcement by adding the name, “Police Lieutenant Melbourne Clarke Drive”, at Route 669 on the island of St. Croix. Act 8817: An Act amending title 3 Virgin Islands Code, Chapter 15, to establish a Real Crime Center and Centralized Crime Data System within the Virgin Islands Police Department.
- April 5, 2024: Act 8814 (Bill No. 35-0207): An Act establishing a registry to track chronic kidney disease and diabetes.
- April 10, 2024: Act 8817: An Act establishing a scholarship program to support individuals interested in pursuing a career in the territory's maritime industry. Act No. 8827: An Act amending Title 24 of Virgin Islands Code, relating to unemployment benefits by reducing the number of weeks that unemployment benefits can be received; increasing the statute of limitations for the collection of overpayments of unemployment benefits from claimants and for delinquent employer contribution and implementing a 10-year record retention period for employers. Act 8840: An Act honoring and commending Vaughn Benjamin posthumously for his contributions to reggae music in the Virgin Islands and the global communities; appropriating $45,000 to the Department of Sports, Parks and Recreation for the design and construction of the “Vaughn Benjamin Monument” and naming the waterfront park west of the Marley Homes “The Vaughn ‘Akae Beka’ Memorial Park”.
- April 11, 2024: Act 8819: An Act enabling the automatic expungement of arrest records upon the court finding that the arrest was made without probable cause. Act 8818: An Act amending Title 29, chapter 5 of V.I. Code, to provide for the adoption of nationally recognized consensus-based codes, standards and amendments to such codes that are in the best interests of the territory, and to provide for clarifications to the Virgin Islands building code. Act 8820: An Act amending Title 14, chapter 51 of V.I. Code, by designating the existing provisions as subchapter I and adding a subchapter II relating to the nonconsensual dissemination of sexually explicit images. Act No. 8822: An Act establishing a deadline for GERS to resume the personal loan program, remove the $10,000,000 annual aggregate amount and the 8% interest rate cap, to limit the System's liability to $75,000, and set a parameter in section 717 that all loans must be structured such that the payoff date occurs before the member reaches age 70. Act 8823: A resolution honoring and commending Mrs. Bernice Alma Turnbull for her lifetime service and dedication to the people of the Virgin Islands. Act 8830: seeks to increase the minimum default amount for child support. Act 8816: An Act posthumously honoring and commending Fenella Cooper for her contributions to the fields of education, sports and culture, while naming the UVI tennis courts in her honor. * Act 8828: An Act renaming a portion of Gamle Gade on St. Thomas as the “William A. Industrious Street”.
- June 24, 2024: Act 8838: The Fair Chance for Employment Act
- July 9, 2024: Act 8856: An Act amending title 23 Virgin Islands Code, chapter 5, section 455 to require the completion of a handgun training class before the renewal of a firearm license and by amending section 457, subsection (a), paragraph (3), relating to increasing the term of the firearm license from three years to five years. (governor’s veto overridden by Legislature)
- July 10, 2024: Act 8842: An Act amending title 27 Virgin Islands Code, chapter 15, sections 421a. and 422 relating to the composition, qualifications, terms, and compensation of the members of the Real Estate Commission.
- July 11, 2024: Act 8834: An Act recognizing the month of March as Girl Scouts Month. Bill No. 35-0078: An Act amending Title I, chapter 7 of V.I. code by establishing “Fish and Fungi” as the official dish of the Virgin Islands and “Tart” as the official dessert of the Virgin Islands, and for other related purposes. Act 8854: An Act appropriating $3,000,000 from the General Fund to the Department of Human Services to pay providers and vendors that participate in the Medicaid program.
- August 9, 2024: Act 8861: An Act appropriating $1,434,950 in Fiscal Year 2024 from the Community Facilities Trust Fund for the preconstruction soft cost funding to prepare for the dredging of Charlotte Amalie harbor., Act 8869: An Act mandating WAPA to seek federal technical assistance within 60 days to modernize its electrical grid.
- August 16, 2024: Act 8873: An Act honoring and commending the Eighth elected Governor of the Virgin Islands, Kenneth Ezra Mapp for his years of service to the people of the Virgin Islands and naming Route 75 on the island of St. Croix from Bassin Triangle intersection at Route 70, Estate Richmond and ending at Krausse's Lagune the “Gov. Kenneth E. Mapp Highway”; appropriating $45,000 from the General Fund of the Treasury of the V.I. Government to the Department of Public Works to implement the mandates of this Act, to bestow the Virgin Islands Medal of Honor on Kenneth Ezra Mapp and for other related purposes. (governor’s veto overridden by Legislature) Act 8874: An Act amending title 2, of V.I. Code, chapter 1 by adding a section 13 providing a penalty for the commission of perjury in proceedings before the Legislature of the Virgin Islands.
- October 16, 2024: Act 8921 (Bill No. 35-0087): An Act amending title 33 Virgin Islands Code, chapter 111 to add section 3038a to establish in the Treasury of the Virgin Islands a special fund designated as the Veterans Mainland Travel Revolving Fund and appropriating $250,000 for reimbursement for veterans’ airfare to travel outside of the VA Caribbean Healthcare Network for necessary medical care. (governor’s veto overridden by Legislature)
- October 31, 2024: Act 8923 (Bill No. 35-0031): An Act amending title 5, Virgin Islands Code, subtitle 3, part I, by adding a new chapter 301A, creating the Child Victims’ and Child Witnesses’ Rights Act and repealing chapter 301, subchapter IV, section 3510. Act 8928 (Bill No. 35-0289): An Act raising the legal age to purchase tobacco products from 18 to 21 years.
- November 25, 2024: Act No. 8950 (Bill No. 35-0416): An Act honoring and commending the Honorable Senator Alicia “Chucky” Hansen posthumously for her unmatched and immeasurable service and dedication to the people of the Virgin Islands, the Caribbean, and the United States as the longest-serving senator from the District of St. Croix and the highest vote-getter in the territory's history by designating December 6 as “Alicia ‘Chucky’ Hansen Day”.
- December 31, 2024: Act 8956 (Bill No. 35-0179): An Act amending title 14 Virgin Islands Code, chapter 61, relating to gambling violations, and title 32 Virgin Islands Code, chapter 13, relating to the Virgin Islands Lottery Commission, to strengthen the enforcement tools against illegal gambling and lottery. Act 8957 (Bill No. 35-0224): An Act expanding access to behavioral health services, with focus on a Crisis Intervention Team to offer mobile crisis intervention services and the 9-8-8 telecommunication system. Act 8958 (Bill No. 35-0254): An Act establishing the Audiology and Speech-Language Pathology Interstate Compact. Act 8959 (Bill No. 35-0295): An Act creating the Virgin Islands Prescription Drug Monitoring Program. Act 8960 (Bill No. 0336): An Act establishing the Office of Conflict Counsel to provide legal representation for indigent defendants and appropriating funds for its creation. Act 8971 (Bill No. 35-0420): Virgin Islands Firearm Serial Number Regulation Act Act 8973 (Bill No. 35-0422): An Act ratifying Minor Coastal Zone Permit No. CZMIW0002-23 issued to 555 Madison Investors V, LLC for the installation of a 408 sq. ft. dock and a four-inch reverse osmosis intake line on and seaward of Plot 7W Estate Nazareth, St. Thomas, Virgin Islands. Act 8974 (Bill No. 35-0423): An Act approving the Fifth Amendment to Lease Agreement between the GVI and Coral World (V.I.), Inc. to extend the lease term, provide for additional rent, and incorporate two surveys reflecting the metes and bounds description of the leased premises. Act 8975 (Bill 35-0424): An Act ratifying Major Coastal Zone Permit No. CZT-06-21(L&W) issued to Jack Rock B-AC, LLC for the development of a marina facility consisting of a restaurant, dock, moorings, wave attenuator, storage and services yard, warehouse building, the dredging of 7,200 yards of material, and the use and occupancy of 45.83 acres of submerged land located on and seaward of Parcel No. 3 (Consolidated 9B-A), Estate Nazareth, St. Thomas, Virgin Islands. Act 8976 (Bill No. 35-0425): An Act to amend various sections of title 5 Virgin Islands Code. Act 8977 (Bill No. 35-0426): An Act authorizing the Virgin Islands Water and Power Authority to sell electricity to any beneficiary in the Virgin Islands South Shore Trade Zone without regulation by the Public Services Commission of the Virgin Islands. Act 8978 (Bill No. 35-0427): An Act requiring the Virgin Islands Waste Management Authority to conduct a feasibility study, including a cost analysis, for the installation of a sewer line from Five Corners to Villa La Reine, St. Croix. Act 8979 (Bill No. 35-0428): An Act appropriating $2,930,870 from the Indirect Cost Fund in the fiscal year October 1, 2024, to September 30, 2025, for the operating expenses of the Office of Management and Budget, the Virgin Islands Division of Personnel, and the Virgin Islands. Act 8980 (Bill No. 35-0430): A resolution honoring and commending the St. Croix Alumnae Chapter of the Delta Sigma Theta Sorority, Incorporated for its numerous contributions to the people of the Virgin Islands and in recognition of the 50th anniversary of its charter. (introduced by Sen. Angel Bolques Jr.) Act 8981 (Bill No. 35-0431): An Act adopting the 2024 Comprehensive Land and Water Use Plan submitted by Department of Planning & Natural Resources on December 10, 2024, as the Official Comprehensive Land and Water Plan, while establishing legislative oversight on the plan's policy, direction and goals.

=== Proposed (but not enacted) ===
- Bill 35-0004: An Act amending title 3 Virgin Islands Code, chapter 27, section 706 and chapter 28A, section 755 allowing retirees who are receiving an annuity from the Government Employees Retirement System who are subsequently employed by the University of the Virgin Islands (“UVI”), to continue to receive their GERS annuity while receiving their salary from the university if the retiree enrolls in a different retirement plan.
- Bill 35-0005: An Act amending title 28 Virgin Islands Code, chapter 31 relating to landlord and tenants by adding a Section 754 to prohibit discrimination on the basis of a tenant's source of legitimate income.
- Bill 35-0008: An Act amending title 3 Virgin Islands Code, chapter 1, section 8a relating to the Office of Veterans Affairs to establish the Veterans Council under the Office of Veterans Affairs to serve as advisor to the office of Veterans Affairs and as a liaison between the Office of Veterans Affairs and all private entities serving veterans in the Territory.
- Bill 35-0015: An Act amending title 28 Virgin Islands Code, chapter 31, subchapter I, section 752 relating to notice for the termination of month-to-month residential tenancies and adding section 752 (b) requiring fair notice for rent increases for residential tenancies.
- Bill 35-0020: An Act granting a zoning use variance for Plot No. 152 of Parcel 6 of Estate Clifton Hill, King Quarter, St. Croix, Virgin Islands, to allow for a closed-door infusion pharmacy.
- Bill No. 35-0028: An Act amending title 33 Virgin Islands Code, subtitle 1, part 1, chapter 3, section 43l, adding TRICARE to medical payment reimbursements subject to the 2.5 percent Virgin Islands gross receipts tax.
- Bill 35-0032: An Act repealing and reenacting title 18 Virgin Islands Code, chapter 1, section 2, relating to government employees’ eligibility for elected office, to allow government employees to run for political office while actively employed, unless specifically prohibited by federal or other laws.
- Bill 35-0037: An Act amending title 3 Virgin Islands Code, chapter 25, subchapter VIII, section 634 to allow for insurance coverage for auxiliary police officers.
- Bill 35-0038: An Act amending title 3 Virgin Islands Code, chapter 25, subchapter V, section 555b to increase the minimum annual salary for full-time employees of GVI, and its semi-autonomous agencies and independent instrumentalities from $27,040 to $32,000.
- Bill 35-0039: An Act amending title 17, chapter 41 of the Virgin Islands Code, relating to Career Day, to expand Career Day into Career Week in Virgin Islands public high schools.
- Bill 35-0042: An Act amending title 2 Virgin Islands Code, chapter 1, section 6 allowing the Police Chief of the Legislature; the Sergeant-of-Arms; or any security officer of the Legislature; who has peace officer status, to arrest a person who neglects or refuses to appear before the Legislature in obedience to subpoena.
- Bill 35-0044: An Act amending title 14 Virgin Islands Code, chapter 31, section 622, expanding the threshold for disorderly conduct towards law enforcement officers.
- Bill 35-0046: An Act amending title 20 Virgin Islands Code, part II, chapter 43, subchapter I to establish parking for expectant mothers or mothers with newborns.
- Bill 35-0047: An act honoring and commending Linval Joseph for his achievements in professional football and his contribution to his community through his creation of a foundation that seeks to raise awareness about bullying.
- Bill 35-0051: An Act amending title 3 Virgin Islands Code, chapter 1, section 27i by changing the name of the Office of Gun Violence Prevention and expanding the duties and responsibilities of the office to include school violence prevention.
- Bill 35-0055: An Act amending title 21, chapter 1, section 16 (3) of the Virgin Islands Code, relating to increasing the amount of funding that can be offered to veterans for mortgages under the Virgin Islands Housing Finance Authority home loans program.
- Bill 35-0057: An Act amending title 3 Virgin Islands Code, chapter 25, subchapter 5 section relating to the automatic increase in salaries of government employees in the executive branch of the Government of the Virgin Islands.
- Bill 35-0058: An Act amending title 29 Virgin Islands Code, by adding a chapter 25 to enact The Public-Private Partnership Agreement Act.
- Bill 35-0059: An Act amending title 3 Virgin Islands Code, chapter 25, subchapter V, section 559 by inserting a subsection (g) relating to pay systems, to establish a pay differential for French and Spanish-speaking bilingual 911 Dispatch Operators and amending title 3 Virgin Islands Code, chapter 25, subchapter IV, section 522, relating to entrance and promotion tests, to provide for foreign language proficiency tests.
- Bill 35-0060: A resolution amending Rule 1003(a) of the Rules of the 35th Legislature of the Virgin Islands by removing the language that gives the President of the Legislature direct authority and supervision over the Chief Legal Counsel.
- Bill 35-0064: An Act amending title 3 Virgin Islands Code, chapter 27, section 715, subsection (c) relating to the power of the GERS Board of Trustees to appoint the Administrator of the GERS to eliminate the requirement for the Legislature's advice and consent to the appointment of the Administrator.
- Bill 35-0065: To ratify a lease agreement between GVI and WAPA (OLC No. 3134-2022).
- Bill 35-0075: An Act designating the third Monday in February as Governor's Day. (bill failed to reach Senate floor)
- Bill 35-0076: An Act honoring and commending former Senator and St. John Administrator, Noble Samuel, posthumously for his many years of dedicated service to the Virgin Islands National Park, visitors to St. John, and the people of the Virgin Islands, by renaming the Centerline Road on St. John from the roundabout in Cruz Bay to the Bordeaux Road entrance, “Noble Samuel Drive”.
- Bill 35-0081: An Act repealing and reenacting Title 27, chapter 1, subchapter IIa to enact the Virgin Islands Telehealth Act, which includes telemedicine and the standards that govern the practice of medicine and the provision of healthcare services using telehealth modalities.
- Bill 35-0085: An Act requiring WAPA to conduct, or cause to be conducted, a study to determine the feasibility of using hydroelectric (water) power in the territory.
- Bill 35-0089: An Act appropriating $600,000 to the Department of Agriculture to be used to fund farmers in the Virgin Islands that produce crops and other food products; and for other related purposes.
- Bill 35-0094: An Act approving the lease agreement between the Government of the Virgin Islands Department of Property and Procurement and the USVI Soccer Federation, Inc for Parcel H of Tract 1 Estate Nazareth, No. 1 Redhook Quarter, St. Thomas, Virgin Islands.
- Bill 35-0096: An Act appropriating $500,000 to establish a Doctor of Philosophy in Business Administration degree program at the St. Croix and St. Thomas campuses of the University of the Virgin Islands.
- Bill 35-0097: An Act amending title 33 Virgin Islands Code, subtitle 1, part 1, chapter 3 by adding section 43m to establish the “Virgin Islands Beautification Tax Credit”.
- Bill 35-0098: An Act amending title 3 Virgin Islands Code by adding a new chapter 7A establishing the Virgin Islands Office of Early Childhood.
- Bill 35-0103: An Act honoring the memory of the enslaved Africans from Akwamu who participated in the 1733 Insurrection on the island of Sankt Jan in the Danish West Indies, directing the Executive Branch to implement and host a Heritage Celebration, and amending title 1 Virgin Islands Code, section 106 to add a gold circular shield to the Governor's Symbol of Office embossed with the flag of the State of Akwamu in the Republic of Ghana.
- Bill 35-0108: An Act appropriating $20,000,000 from the Settlement Agreement between the Government of the Virgin Islands and the Estate of Jeffrey E. Epstein; Darren K. Indyke, in his individual capacity and in his capacity as the Co-Executor for the Estate of Jeffery E. Epstein and Administrator of The 1953 Trust; Richard D. Kahn, in his individual capacity and in his capacity as Co-Executor of the Estate of Jeffery E. Epstein and Administrator of The 1953 Trust; The 1953 Trust; Plan D, LLC; Great St. James, LLC; Nautilus, Inc.; Hyperion Air, LLC; Poplar, Inc.; Southern Trust Company, Inc.; Maple, Inc.; and Laurel, Inc. (collectively Defendants) to the Department of Public Works for the design and construction of a nursing home on St. Croix and a nursing home on St. Thomas.
- Bill 35-0110: An Act repealing Act No. 8722, Section 6, which authorized the suspension and abeyance of the horse racing Anti-Doping provisions of the Virgin Islands Code.
- Bill 35-0111: An Act amending title 30 Virgin Islands Code, chapter 5, subchapter V relating to the estimation of utility bills and the disconnection of utility services by establishing parameters for estimating utility bills, repayment of underestimated and overestimated utility usage, and for utility disconnections for past due amounts.
- Bill 35-0113: An Act amending title 2, chapter 2, section 28(b) relating to the Executive Appropriation Act to repeal the authority of the Legislature's Standing Committee on Finance and any successor committee to approve appropriation transfers within the operating budgets of Government, departments, and agencies.
- Bill 35-0118: An Act amending title 33 Virgin Islands Code, chapter 3, section 54(b)(3)(D)(iii) allocating $2,500,000 of the Timeshare Environmental/Infrastructure Impact Fee to the Virgin Islands Waste Management Authority for beautification and cleanup of the Territory.
- Bill 35-0120: An Act approving the Lease Agreement between the Government of the Virgin Islands, acting through its Commissioner of the Department of Property and Procurement, and the Virgin Islands Water and Power Authority (VIWAPA) for Parcel No. 6-4 Remainder Estate Carolina, No. 1 Coral Bay Quarter, St. John, Virgin Islands, zoned R-2 consisting of approximately 157, 992.12 U.S. sq. ft. or 3.627 U.S. acre as shown on O.L.G. File No. D9-9596-T021 to be used for constructing and operating a solar battery generator microgrid and for other related purposes.
- Bill 35-0121: An Act amending Virgin Islands Code, title 4, chapter 29, section 482 and title 5, subtitle I, part V, chapter 61, section 660 increasing jury and witness fees and allowances, respectively.
- Bill 35-0122: An Act amending title 5, chapter 302, subchapters I and II of the Virgin Islands Code, to rename the Public Defender Administration Board, the Office of the Public Defender, and the Chief Public Defender as the “Territorial Public Defender Administration Board”, Office of the Territorial Public Defender”, and the “Chief Territorial Public Defender” respectively.
- Bill 35-0186: An Act repealing and reenacting title 3 Virgin Islands Code, chapter 16, section 274 “Virgin Islands Taxicab Commission and enacting in its place “The Division of Transportation and Taxicab Services”.
- Bill 35-0202: An Act amending title 29, chapter 3 of the Virgin Islands Code to authorize the Historic Preservation Commission to relax certain restrictions as it relates to conservation and preservation of historic and cultural assets in the historic downtown districts of Christiansted, Frederiksted, Charlotte Amalie and Cruz Bay.(held in Committee on Disaster Recovery, Infrastructure and Planning)
- Bill 35-0203: An Act amending title 19 Virgin Islands Code, chapter 53A, section 1483, relating to the smoking ban, to prohibit smoking in a vehicle when persons under the age of 18 are present; and for other related purposes.
- Bill 35-0204: An Act appropriating $3 million from the General Fund of the Government of the Virgin Islands to the Virgin Islands Police Department for the purchase and installation of cameras throughout the Territory.
- Bill 35-0238: An Act to confer peace officer status on qualified enforcement officers employed by the Government Employees Retirement System of the Virgin Islands.
- Bill 35-0243: An Act requiring individuals to get concise from the Police Commissioner before purchasing firearm components that will be mailed or shipped to the territory. (held in Committee on Homeland Security, Justice and Public Safety)
- Bill 35-0248: An resolution authorizing Congress to amend the Revised Organic Act to allow the people of the Virgin Islands to elect an Attorney General. (bill failed in Committee on Homeland Security, Justice and Public Safety)
- Bill 35-0395: An Act designating individuals to change their gender on identification cards, driver's licenses and other related purposes. (bill failed in Committee on Homeland Security, Justice and Public Safety)
- Bill 35-0429: An Act extending the State of Emergency in the Virgin Islands based on the power and energy crisis for an additional 30 days from December 21, 2024, through January 20, 2025.

== Vetoed ==
- November 29, 2023: Bill 35-0200: An Act requiring WAPA to issue a monthly water bill abatement for six months to customers on St. Croix affected by levels of lead and copper.
- May 8, 2024: Bill 35-0266: An Act reappropriating funds from a previous $6 million loan to WAPA to cover current payment obligations of the territory's two hospitals and Waste Management Authority; Bill No. 35-0268: An Act requiring the Governor to seek approval from the Legislature for any use of government funds in response to man-made disasters and would have given the Legislature authority to terminate emergency declarations with a two-thirds majority.
- December 31, 2024: Bill No. 35-0108: An Act appropriating $20,000,000 from the Settlement Agreement between the Government of the Virgin Islands and the Estate of Jeffrey E. Epstein; Darren K. Indyke, in his individual capacity and in his capacity as the Co-Executor for the Estate of Jeffery E. Epstein and Administrator of The 1953 Trust; Richard D. Kahn, in his individual capacity and in his capacity as Co-Executor of the Estate of Jeffery E. Epstein and Administrator of The 1953 Trust; The 1953 Trust; Plan D, LLC; Great St. James, LLC; Nautilus, Inc.; Hyperion Air, LLC; Poplar, Inc.; Southern Trust Company, Inc.; Maple, Inc.; and Laurel, Inc. (collectively Defendants) to the Department of Public Works for the design and construction of a nursing home on both St. Croix and St. Thomas.

== Major resolutions ==
=== Adopted ===
- Resolution 1900: A resolution organizing and establishing the Majority Caucus, electing the officers, and appointing the chairpersons, vice-chairpersons, and members of the standing committees of the Thirty-Fifth Legislature of the Virgin Islands.
- Resolution 1901: Adopting the Rules of the 35th Legislature.
- Resolution 1902: An Act amending the Rules of the 35th Legislature of the Virgin Islands, Rule 205 (a), by removing the provision that a minority caucus must consist of not less than five Senators.
- Resolution 1903: A resolution honoring and commending Kelly L. Charleswell, Sr. better known as “Pupa Kelly” for his contribution to the people of the Virgin Islands iii the field of music as a teacher and instructor in the public school system and his involvement with the musical bands of the Virgin Islands.
- Resolution 1904: A resolution honoring and commending the Supervisor of Elections, Caroline Fawkes, and her entire team for their tireless service and contributions to the Virgin Islands community and on the occasion during the 60th Anniversary of the establishment of the V.I. Election System.
- Resolution 1905: A resolution honoring and commending Gregory “DJ Avalanche” Hodge for his contributions as a disk jockey, radio talk host and entertainer while presenting him with the Official Key of the Virgin Islands.
- Resolution 1906: A resolution honoring and commending Music in Motion School of Higher Dance Education and its founder, Charlita Schuster, on the 40th Anniversary of the establishment of the Music in Motion Dance Academy.
- Resolution 1908: A resolution honoring and commending Indiana Fever basketball player Aliyah Boston for her athletic accomplishments while awarding her the Key to the Virgin Islands.
- Resolution 1910: A resolution honoring and commending Lieutenant Colonel Leayle Gerard Galiber for his leadership in the Virgin Islands National Guard and his dedication to the country and to the people of the Virgin Islands.
- Resolution 1911: A resolution requiring the V.I. Public Service Commission to file a complaint on behalf of the people of the Virgin Islands against Liberty Latin America and its subsidiaries, Liberty Mobile USVI and Liberty Mobile Puerto Rico, with the Federal Communications Commission.

=== Proposed ===
- Bill 35-0090: A resolution expressing the sense of the Legislature in support of the transfer of Tract No. 01-137A on St. John from the National Park Service to the Government of the Virgin Islands to build a K-12 school.

== Zonings ==
- Act 8710: An act amending the Official Zoning Map No. SCZ-7 for the island of St. Croix to change the zoning designation of Plot Nos. 102-A Remainder, 102-B, and 102-C Estate Hermon Hill, Company Quarter, St. Croix, Virgin Islands, from R-3 (Residential-Medium Density) to P (Public).
- Act 8711: An Act granting a zoning use variance for Plot No. 2-137 Estate Sion Hill, Queen Quarter, St. Croix, Virgin Islands, from the R-2 (Residential-Low Density-One and Two Family) to allow for a beauty salon.
- Act 8712: An Act granting a zoning use variance for Parcel No. 5C Estate Anna's Retreat, No. 1 New Quarter, St. Thomas, Virgin Islands, to allow for dwellings.
- Act 8718: An Act granting a zoning use variance for Parcel No. 84 Estate Contant, No. 7B, Southside Quarter, St. Thomas, Virgin Islands from the R-3 (Residential-Medium Density) zoning designation to allow for offices.
- Act 8723: An Act amending Official Zoning Map No. SCZ-10 for the island of St. Croix to change the zoning designation of Plot No. 71 Consolidate Estate Concordia, West End Quarter, St. Croix, Virgin Islands from R-2 (Residential-Low Density-One and Two Family) to R-3 (Residential-Medium Density).
- Act 8724: An Act amending Official Zoning Map No. SCZ-10 for the island of St. Croix to rezone Plot No. 52-B Estate Hannah's Rest, West End Quarter, St. Croix, Virgin Islands, from C (Commercial) to B-3 (Business Scattered).
- Act 8725: An Act amending Official Zoning Map No. SCZ-10 to rezone Plot No. 34-A Estate Two Brothers and Smithfield, West End Quarter, St. Croix from R-3 (Residential- Medium Density) to B-3 (Business-Scattered).
- Act 8726: An Act amending Official Zoning Map No. SCZ-11 for the island of St. Croix to rezone Plot No. 140-H Estate St. George, Prince Quarter, St. Croix, Virgin Islands, from R-2 (Residential-Low Density-One and Two Family) to B-3 (Business-Scattered)
- Act 8727: An Act granting a zoning use variance from the R-2 (Residential-Low Density-One and Two Family) zoning designation for Parcel No. 14 Rem. Estate Carolina, Coral Bay Quarter, St. John.
- Act 8740: An Act granting a zoning use variance from the B-2 (Business-Secondary/ Neighborhood) zoning designation to Plot Nos, 50-1 and 50-4 Estate Orange Grove, Company Quarter, St. Croix, Virgin Islands to allow for the manufacture of concrete products.
- Act 8808: An Act granting a zoning use variance for the construction and operation of a guesthouse in Estate Glynn, St. Croix.
- Act 8972: An Act amending Official Zoning Map No. SCZ-11 to rezone Plot No. 13-A Combined Estate Hogensborg, West End Quarter, St. Croix from R-1 (Residential-Low Density) to R-2 (Residential-Low Density-One and Two Family) and Remainder of Parcel No. 4 Combined Estate Hogensborg, West End Quarter, St. Croix be rezoned from R-1 (Residential-Low Density) to B-3 (Business-Scattered) to allow for a mixed used development.
- Act 8825: An Act ratifying Minor Coastal Zone Permit No. CZT-18-21(W) issued to Beach Life, LLC for the continued use and occupancy of submerged lands and the installation of a five-foot-wide by thirty-foot long floating dock anchored by a four-foot wide by twenty-four-foot-long wooden walkway on Honeymoon beach and seaward of Tract C-1 Estate Water Island.
- Act 8826: An Act granting a conditional zoning use variance for Plots Nos. 219 and 220 Estate Morningstar, Queen Quarter, St. Croix, from the R-1(Residential-Low Density) zoning designation to allow for a restaurant and bar, amphitheater, retail, a barber or beauty salon, short-term rental/guesthouse, and event space rental/rental of commercial space.
- Act 8831: An Act granting a use variance to Parcels No. 41 Remainder Estate Contant and 41-C Estate Contant, 7A Southside Quarter, St. Thomas, Virgin Islands to allow for commercial parking.
- Act 8832: An Act granting a zoning variance from the I-2 (Light Industry) zoning designation to Revised Parcel No. 17-3 Remainder Estate Nisky, No. 6 Southside Quarter, St. Thomas, Virgin Islands, to allow for a business hotel.
- Act 8833: An Act amending Official Zoning Map No. STZ-7 to rezone Reconfigured Remainder Consolidated Parcel No. 1-13 Estate Donoe, No. 2A New Quarter, St. Thomas, Virgin Islands, behind Cost-U-Less from R-4 (Residential-Medium Density) to B-3 (Business-Scattered).

== Party summary ==
	Party (Shading indicates majority/plurality)			Total
	Democratic	Independent	Independent Citizens	Total
End of previous Legislature	10	5	0	15
Begin (January 9, 2023)	11	4	0	15
Latest voting share	60%	40%	0%	100%

== Leadership ==
=== Presiding ===
- Senate President: Novelle Francis (D)
- Vice President: Marvin Blyden (D)

==== Majority (Democratic) ====
- Majority Leader: Kenneth Gittens (D)
- Secretary: Carla Joseph (D)
- Intergovernmental Territorial Affairs Secretary: Marise James (D)
- Liaison to Congress: Donna Frett-Gregory (D)
- Liaison to the Department of Interior & Office of Insular Affairs: Carla Joseph (D)
- Liaison to the White House: Kenneth Gittens (D)

==== Majority Caucus ====
- Senators Novelle Francis, Marvin Blyden, Kenneth Gittens,Angel Bolques Jr., Carla Joseph, Diane Capehart, Ray Fonseca, Donna Frett-Gregory, Javan James Sr., Marise James, Milton Potter.

==== Minority Caucus ====
- Senators Alma Francis-Heyliger, Dwayne DeGraff, Franklin Johnson, Samuel Carrion

== Members ==
District	Name	Party	Took office
At-large	Angel Bolques Jr.	Democratic	2022
St. Croix	Franklin D. Johnson	Independent	2021
St. Croix	Diane T. Capehart	Democratic	2023
St. Croix	Javan E. James, Sr.	Democratic	2019
St. Croix	Kenneth Gittens	Democratic	2019
St. Croix	Marise James	Democratic	2023
St. Croix	Novelle Francis	Democratic	2015
St. Croix	Samuel Carrion	Independent	2021
St. Thomas/ St. John	Alma Francis-Heyliger	Independent	2021
St. Thomas/ St. John	Carla J. Joseph	Democratic	2021
St. Thomas/ St. John	Donna Frett-Gregory	Democratic	2019
St. Thomas/ St. John	Dwayne M. DeGraff	Independent	2017
St. Thomas/ St. John	Ray Fonseca	Democratic	2023
St. Thomas/ St. John	Marvin Blyden	Democratic	2015
St. Thomas/ St. John	Milton E. Potter	Democratic	2021

== Committees ==
Committee	Chair	Vice Chair
Committee of the Whole	Novelle Francis	Marvin Blyden
Economic Development and Agriculture	Javan James Sr.	Angel Bolques Jr.
Budget, Appropriations and Finance	Donna Frett-Gregory	Novelle Francis
Education and Workforce Development	Marise James	Donna Frett-Gregory
Health, Hospitals and Human Services	Ray Fonseca	Kenneth Gittens
Government Operations, Veteran Affairs and Consumer Protection	Carla Joseph	Javan James Sr.
Homeland Security, Justice and Public Safety	Kenneth Gittens	Ray Fonseca
Housing, Transportation and Telecommunications	Marvin Blyden	Marise James
Culture, Aging, Sports, Parks and Youth	Angel Bolques Jr.	Marvin Blyden
Rules and Judiciary	Diane Capehart	Milton Potter
Disaster Recovery, Infrastructure and Planning	Milton Potter	Diane Capehart

== See also ==
- List of Virgin Islands Legislatures
