= St. John Land Exchange Act of 2023 =

Virgin Islands law

St. John Land Exchange

Legislature of the Virgin Islands
- Long title: An Act approving the conveyance by the Government of the Virgin Islands of the United States to the United States of America, Department of Interior, acting by and through the National Park Service, of Tract No. 02-101 Whistling Island a/k/a Whistling Cay, Cruz Bay Quarter, St. John, Virgin Islands, in exchange for the Department of Interior, National Park Service’s conveyance to the Government of the Virgin Islands of the United States of a portion of Tract No. 01-137A Catherineberg (Hammer’s Farm) Cruz Bay Quarter, St. John, Virgin Islands, and directing the Government to deposit of the proceeds from the parcel exchange into the St. John Capital Improvements Fund.
- Citation: Bill No. 35-0112
- Enacted by: 35th Virgin Islands Legislature
- Signed by: Albert Bryan
- Signed: September 29, 2023

Legislative history
- Introduced by: Novelle E. Francis
- Passed: September 15, 2023
- Voting summary: 9 Senators voted for; 6 Senators voted against

The St. John Land Exchange Act (Bill No. 35-0112), commonly known as the St. John land swap, is a controversial act enacted by the 35th Virgin Islands Legislature, which authorized the Virgin Islands Government the transfer of Whistling Cay to the federal government of the United States through the National Park Service for a parcel of land in Estate Catherineberg (Hammer's Farm) to construct a K-12 school on the island of St. John.

The legislation was introduced in July 2023 by Senate President Novelle Francis, on behalf of the Governor of the U.S. Virgin Islands. It passed the Senate with 9 Democrats voting for it, and 4 Independents and 1 Democrat voting against it. On September 29, 2023, Governor Albert Bryan signed the bill into law in Cruz Bay, St. John.

== Timeline ==
- In December 2003, St. John Administrator, Julien Harley identified Estate Catherineberg as a potential location for the land swap or lease during a Town hall meeting on St. John with Governor Charles Turnbull.
- In July 2007, Delegate to Congress Donna Christensen introduced legislation in 109th Congress.
- In 2013, then Governor John de Jongh and Delegate Christensen received technical assistance from the Department of Interior and developed a conceptual plan for a secondary school to be built in St. John and oversaw the Phase I Archaeological Investigation of the Estate Catherineberg property, after which multiple scoping meetings about the urgency for the school took place.
- In mid 2014, the USVI Department of Education and the Office of the Governor hosted multiple public meetings with the Jaredian Design Group. The Jaredian Design Group presented the programming plan and conceptual models for a school at the 11-acre Catherineberg parcel following a Phase 1 Archaeology Survey (2013) contracted by the Virgin Islands Government, funded by the DOI Office of Insular Affairs, through the NPS.
- In October 2018, Governor Mapp addressed the land exchange at a St. John town hall.
- In October 2019, USVI Department of Education hosted a well-attended open house at the St. John legislative building to describe Governor Bryan's future vision for a new school. The NPS Catherineberg Estate was identified as the only preferred location.
- In November 2019, Governor Albert Bryan offered Whistling Cay, an 18-acre island north of St. John, to the National Park Service, in exchange for an 11-acre parcel of National Park land in Estate Catherineberg, that would serve as the site of a new Pre-K through 12th grade public school.
- In June 2020, USVI Department of Education hosted two St John-focused meetings with DLR Group to share VI Educational Facilities Master Plan including a new prek-12 grade school design for Estate Catherineberg.
- In October 2020, Trump administration signed a preliminary non-binding agreement with the Virgin Islands Government to evaluate the land exchange.
- In June 2021, Governor Albert Bryan hosted a well-attended Town Hall meeting in Cruz Bay to discuss the St. John Land Exchange and other St. John-specific issues.
- In March 2023, the Government of the Virgin Islands held two days of meetings on St. John to discuss comprehensive development for the island and proposed school.

== Debate ==
=== Support ===
==== Current officials ====
The most proponents of the land exchange are local government officials. USVI Governor Albert Bryan, who signed the bill; Education Commissioner Dionne Wells-Hendrington; Senate President Novelle Francis, who presented the bill on the Senate floor.; Government House spokesman Richard Motta Jr.; and Delegate to Congress Stacey Plaskett, who have worked with federal partners to ensure that the voices of residents were being heard.

Bryan said “After half a century of setbacks and obstacles, our collective goal of establishing a secondary school on the island of St. John is at last a reality. This historic achievement is the result of the culmination of decades of work, spanning numerous administrations and requiring leadership from public servants across the nation.” “The gravity of the calling we share in protecting and providing for future generations has never been more apparent. Our opportunity to safeguard the future of education for our children is upon us.”

Dionne Wells-Hendrington, a staunch supporter of the proposal upon taking the helm of the Education Department. “We all have opinions on what we think should happen, but at the end of the day, what price are we paying when it comes to our children?” She expressed concern about rising construction costs and the possibility of losing FEMA funds that have been promised to build the school. When a majority of residents asked why NPS could not have donate the land. She further said “My children had to endure it, and I don't want my grandchildren to have to endure it. It's time for us to be serious about where we’re putting our values and our priorities. I want to see our children receive what is overdue to them for decades,”.

Francis said “I can see disenfranchisement here. What side of history will we find ourselves on? It's unfortunate how the federal government has its knees on our throats. For 50 years, our students have been disenfranchised.“On St. John, there are no public high schools. The youths are simply asking to be educated at a location close to their homes. Not continue to toil just to get an education. It is a tough decision to make because I agree that we should not have to give up anything.

Motta has urged residents to support the land swap. He stated “Many of you may also be aware of just how long this agreement has been in the making — some 50 years,” he said, “dating back to Gov. Melvin Evans and most notably championed by the late Gov. Charles W. Turnbull.”

Plaskett said "I acknowledge the tough decisions our local government faces with regards to the proposed Government of the Virgin Islands – National Park Service (NPS) St. John Land Exchange,"

==== Former officials ====
Senator Shawn-Michael Malone said “The construction of a high school on St. John will further mark the development of the island and will demonstrate that the island is continually improving.” I think the governor's decision to swap land is a reasonable one that will yield positive results for the residents of St. John for years to come.

Senator At Large Craig Barshinger said “It's good for the V.I. because it allows us to have a first class educational facility with K through 12 grades and the possibility of a U.V.I. satellite presence.” In fact, as far back as 2002, the 2002 Team Democrats had on our platform the rebuilding and relocation of Julius E. Sprauve School on St. John.

Senator At Large Steven Payne said “It's been way too long. Everyone who has to sign off on it in the Virgin Islands has,” “so we’re going to knock on some doors.”

=== Opposition ===
Residents on St. John expressed concerns about the historical ties that has Whistling Cay related to slavery being forgotten, the lack of limited opportunities and ancestral land for native St. Johnians, and the inability for NPS to provide information regarding the exchange.

==== Community members ====
Former Senator-at-large Cleon Creque opposed the idea, calling the deal a “synonym of acquisition” dubbed an exchange to make it more palatable. “I'm not in favor of exchanging Whistling Cay for a school that I feel we are entitled to,”

Ida Smith, a sixth-generation St. Johnian and future candidate for Delegate, claimed that the entire land swap deal was invalid because of errors introduced following the original government survey of the area.

==== Lawmakers ====
Senator DeGraff said Other senators opposed not the construction of a new school for St. John, but the idea of requiring land be exchanged in order to do so. “Dwayne Maurice De Graff votes no unless I have no other choice,”

Senator Donna Frett-Gregory claimed that the entire deal was an attempt to “strong-arm” Virgin Islanders by expediting funding to build the St. John school while dawdling on approvals for storm-damaged schools with much larger student populations on St. Thomas and St. Croix.

Senator Ray Fonseca said “For those of you that don't have access to your land now, this land swap deal ain’t gon’ resolve this issue,”

==== St. John Heritage Collective (St.JanCo) ====
Dr. Haydia Sewer, CEO and president of the St. John Heritage Collective (St.JanCo), said “This legislation proposing the exchange of Whistling Cay for land in Catherineberg leads us to believe that we have to choose between our children's future and our land. Those of us who oppose the land swap do so in part because we believe this to be a false choice,”

== Legislative history ==
St. Croix Senator and President of the 35th Legislature, Novelle Francis introduced BR 23–0590 to the Committee of the Whole. On July 20, 2023, the Committee voted to delay the bill for 45 working days following a motion from Senator Kenneth Gittens.

The Senate passed the land swap deal, with a 9–5 vote on September 15, 2023. The 9 Democrats that voted for it were Novelle Francis, Marvin Blyden, Angel Bolques Jr., Diane Capehart, Carla Joseph, Ray Fonseca, Javan James Sr., Marise James and Milton Potter. The 1 Democrat who voted against it was Kenneth Gittens and the other senators whom were all Independents were Alma Francis-Heyliger, Dwayne DeGraff, Samuel Carrión, and Franklin Johnson that voted against it.

Governor Albert Bryan signed the bill into law alongside Lt. Governor Tregenza Roach, Education Commissioner Dionne Wells-Hendrington, Senate President Novelle Francis, and Director of Disaster Recovery, Adrienne Williams-Octalien in Cruz Bay, St. John on September 29, 2023.

During a December 19 session, St. John's lone representative Angel Bolques Jr. introduced an amendment to change a section of Act 8741. It was approved by Governor Bryan in January 2024.
