= 2018 United States Virgin Islands general election =

The United States Virgin Islands general election was held on 6 November 2018. Voters chose the non-voting delegate to the United States House of Representatives, all fifteen seats in the Legislature of the Virgin Islands, and the governor of the United States Virgin Islands.

== Gubernatorial election ==
2018 United States Virgin Islands gubernatorial election
- November 6, 2018 (first round); November 20, 2018 (runoff)
- Registered: 51,092
- Turnout: 26,346 (runoff: 23,032)
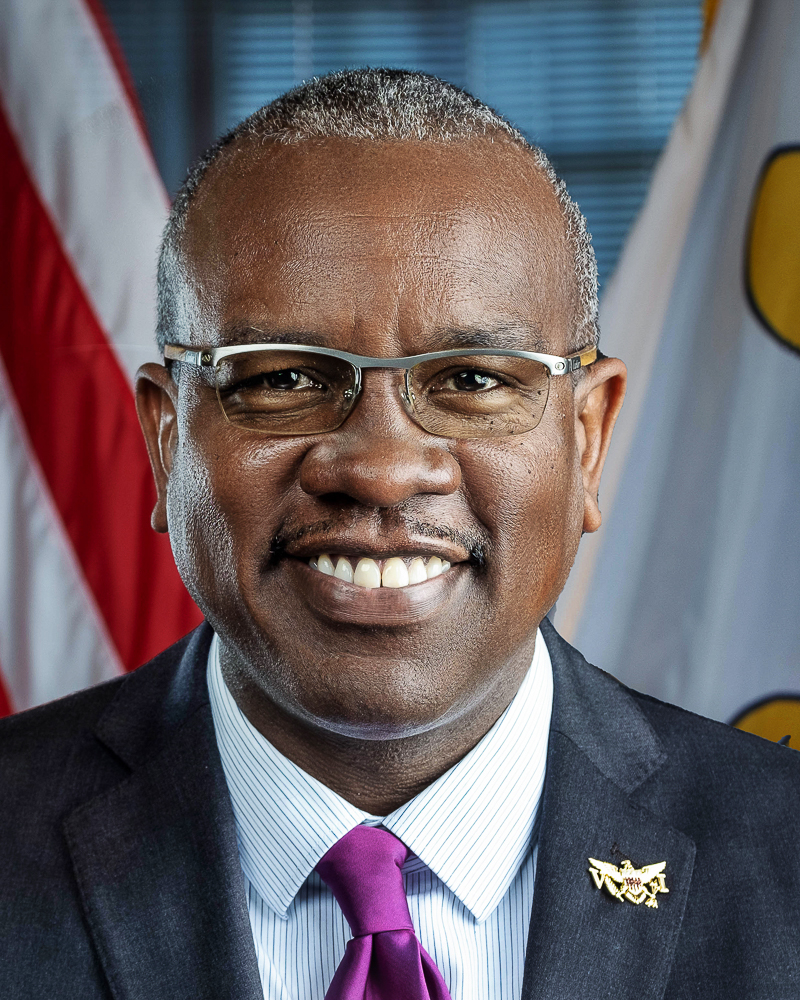

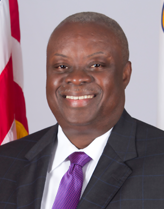
Candidate	Albert Bryan	Kenneth Mapp
Party	Democratic	Independent
Running mate	Tregenza Roach	Osbert Potter
Popular vote	9,711 general 12,677 runoff	8,529 general 10,288 runoff
Percentage	38.08% general 55.04% runoff	33.45 general 44.67 runoff
- Results by district Bryan: Mapp
Governor before election
Kenneth Mapp
Independent
Elected Governor
Albert Bryan
Democratic

On Election Day Albert Bryan earned 38.08% of the vote, with Incumbent Governor Kenneth Mapp coming in second with 33.45%. Since no candidate received a majority of the general election vote, as required by the Revised Organic Act of the Virgin Islands, a runoff was held 14 days later between Bryan and Map, the top two vote-getters. On November 20, 2018, Democrat Albert Bryan Jr. won the runoff with 54.5% of the vote.

== Legislature of the Virgin Islands ==
=== Democratic primary ===
The Democratic primary election were held on August 4, 2018. The seven candidates who received the highest votes would proceed to the general election. In the at-large district race, Democrat Steven Payne Sr. defeated incumbent senator Brian Smith.

Senator at-large
Candidate	Votes	%
Steven D. Payne Sr.	3,482	50.09
Stacie January	2,090	30.06
Brian A. Smith (incumbent)	1,350	19.42
Write-in	30	0.43
Total	6,952	100.00

St. Thomas/St. John
Candidate	Votes	%
Donna Frett-Gregory	3,048	12.73
Marvin Blyden (incumbent)	2,557	10.68
Athniel “Bobby” Thomas	2,299	9.60
Myron D. Jackson (incumbent)	2,227	9.30
Stedmann Hodge Jr.	2,124	8.87
Carla Joseph	2,124	8.87
Jean Forde	2,124	8.87
Kent Bernier Sr.	1,639	6.84
Sean “Skooly” Georges	1,426	5.95
Albert F. Richardson	1,275	5.32
Jonathan P. Tucker Jr.	1,159	4.84
Randolph Thomas	935	3.90
Randolph N. Bennett	880	3.67
Write-in	133	0.56
Total	23,950	100.00

St. Croix
Candidate	Votes	%
Alicia Barnes	2,651	12.52
Allison DeGazon	2,328	10.99
Novelle Francis (incumbent)	1,842	8.70
Kurt Vialet (incumbent)	1,842	8.70
Javan James Sr.	1,640	7.74
Kenneth Gittens	1,560	7.37
Oakland Benta	1,468	6.93
Neville James (incumbent)	1,461	6.90
Nemmy Williams-Jackson	1,374	6.49
Terrence Joseph	1,218	5.75
Karen Chancellor	985	4.65
Douglas Canton	915	4.32
Dean R. Andrews	705	3.33
Juan Figueroa-Serville	635	3.00
Annette L.S. Scott	338	1.60
R.J. Hammer	147	0.69
Write-in	72	0.34
Total	21,181	100.00

=== General election ===
2018 United States Virgin Islands legislative election
- November 6, 2018

All 15 seats in the Legislature of the Virgin Islands
	Majority party	Minority party	Third party
Leader	Kenneth Gittens	Dwayne DeGraff
Party	Democratic	Independent	Independent Citizens Movement
Leader since	January 14, 2019	January 14, 2019
Leader's seat	St. Croix	St. Thomas
Last election	11	3	1
Seats before	11	3	1
Seats after	13	2	0
Seat change	2 ▲	1 ▼	1 ▼
Senate President before election
Myron Jackson
Democratic
Elected Senate President
Kenneth Gittens
Democratic

==== Polling ====
Poll source	Date(s) administered	Sample size	Margin of error	Steven Payne (D)	Sherry Ann-Francis (I)	Angel Bolques (I)	Undecided
VI Tech Stack	October 27–30, 2018	800	± 3.46%	25%	21%	17%	37%

==== Results ====
Senator at-large
Candidate	Party	Votes	%
Steven D. Payne Sr.	Democratic Party	8,335	43.88
Sherry-Ann Francis	Independent	6,361	33.49
Angel L. Bolques Jr.	Independent	4,242	22.33
Write-in		55	0.29
Total		18,993	100.00
Total votes		26,346	–
Registered voters/turnout		51,095	51.56

St. Thomas/St. John
Candidate	Party	Votes	%
Donna Frett-Gregory	Democratic Party	6,980	10.51
Marvin Blyden	Democratic Party	6,346	9.55
Athneil "Bobby" Thomas	Democratic Party	5,698	8.58
Dwayne M. DeGraff	Independent	5,460	8.22
Stedmann Hodge Jr.	Democratic Party	5,428	8.17
Janelle K. Sarauw	Independent	5,339	8.04
Myron D. Jackson	Democratic Party	5,159	7.77
Carla Joseph	Democratic Party	4,881	7.35
Alma Francis-Heyliger	Independent Citizens Movement	4,605	6.93
Jean A. Forde	Democratic Party	4,204	6.33
Stephen "Smokey" Frett	Independent Citizens Movement	3,021	4.55
Irvin Pudna Mason Sr.	Independent	2,006	3.02
Dolores Todmann	Independent	1,721	2.59
Wilma Marsh Monsanto	Independent	1,661	2.50
Gustave R. Dowling	Independent	1,254	1.89
Bruce Flamon	Republican Party	1,113	1.68
Margaret Price	Independent	741	1.12
George Trager	Independent	626	0.94
Write-in		195	0.29
Total		66,438	100.00

St. Croix
Candidate	Party	Votes	%
Alicia Barnes	Democratic Party	7,494	12.45
Allison DeGazon	Democratic Party	7,429	12.35
Kurt Vialet	Democratic Party	5,495	9.13
Javan James Sr.	Democratic Party	5,432	9.03
Novelle Francis	Democratic Party	5,280	8.77
Kenneth Gittens	Democratic Party	4,225	7.02
Oakland Benta	Democratic Party	4,105	6.82
Genevieve Whitaker	Independent	2,607	4.33
Daren "Bogle" Stevens	Independent	2,567	4.27
Michael J. Springer	Independent	2,160	3.59
Lilliana Belardo-O'Neal	Republican Party	2,123	3.53
Robert B. Moorhead	Republican Party	2,019	3.36
Norman Baptiste	Independent	1,826	3.03
Emmett Hansen	Independent	1,651	2.74
Patricia James	Independent	1,614	2.68
Malik Stridiron	Independent	1,207	2.01
Troy Mason	Independent	1,109	1.84
Carew Felix	Independent	860	1.43
Omar Hashim Henry	Independent	430	0.71
Abraham Ortiz	Independent	374	0.62
Write-in		166	0.28
Total		60,173	100.00

== Delegate to the United States House of Representatives ==
2018 United States House of Representatives election in the United States Virgin Islands, at-large district
- November 6, 2018
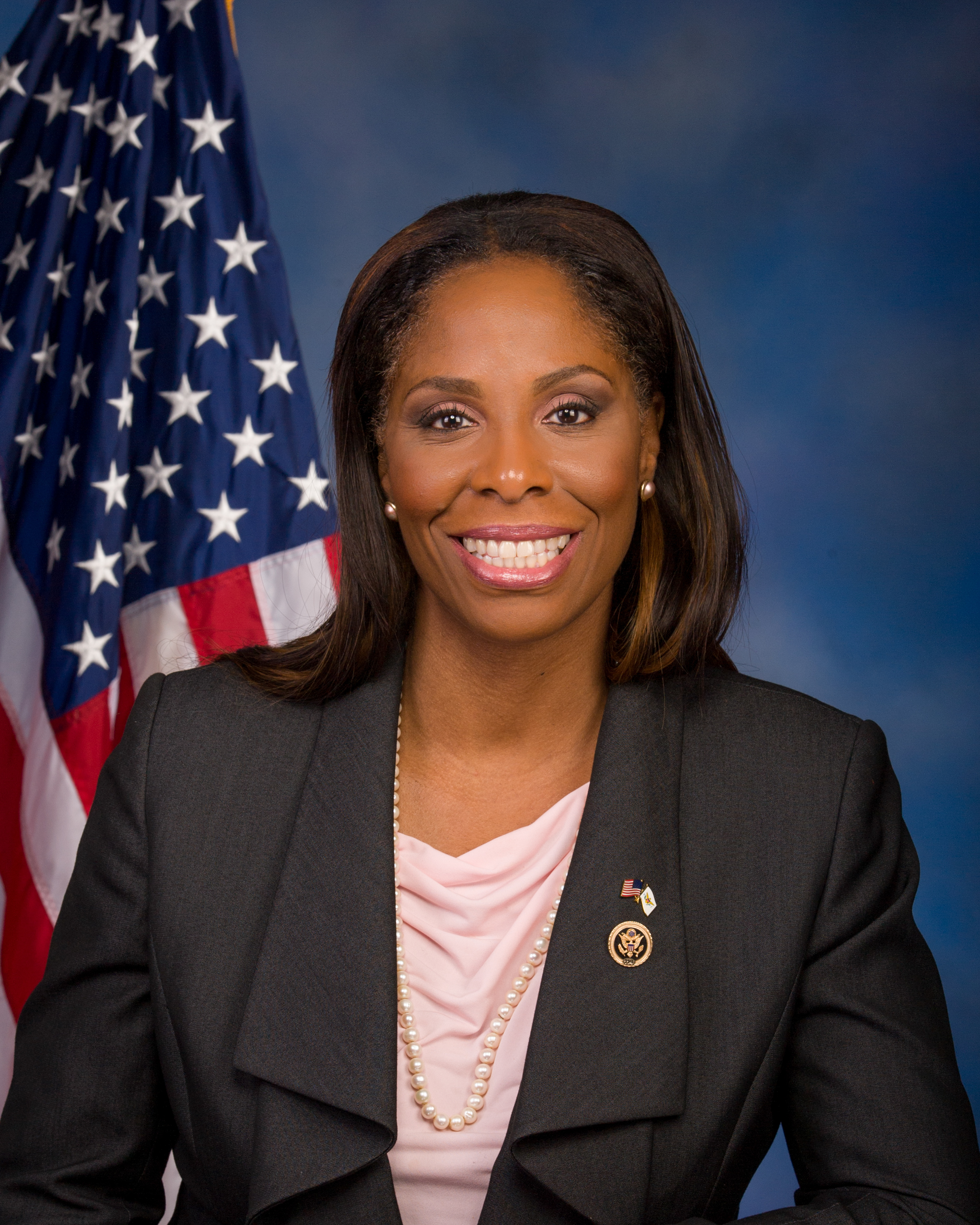
Candidate	Stacey Plaskett
Party	Democratic
Popular vote	16,341
Percentage	98.4%
Delegate at-large before election
Stacey Plaskett
Democratic
Elected Delegate at-large
Stacey Plaskett
Democratic

The 2018 United States House of Representatives election in the United States Virgin Islands was held on Tuesday, November 6, 2018, to elect the non-voting Delegate to the United States House of Representatives from the United States Virgin Islands' at-large congressional district. The election coincided with the larger United States House election and other elections in the United States Virgin Islands, such as the 2018 gubernatorial general election.

The non-voting delegate is elected for a two-year term. Incumbent delegate Stacey Plaskett, a Democrat, who sought re-election for a third term, was the only declared candidate. She was unopposed in the primary and general elections.

Candidate	Party	Votes	%
Stacey Plaskett	Democratic Party	16,341	98.41
Write-in		264	1.59
Total		16,605	100.00
Total votes		26,346	–
Registered voters/turnout		51,095	51.56
