= 2020 United States Virgin Islands general election =

The 2020 United States Virgin Islands general election was held on Tuesday, November 3, 2020, to elect the non-voting delegate to the United States House of Representatives and all fifteen seats in the Legislature of the Virgin Islands.

== Legislature of the Virgin Islands ==
2020 United States Virgin Islands legislative election
- November 3, 2020

All 15 seats in the Legislature of the Virgin Islands
	Majority party	Minority party
Leader	Donna Frett-Gregory	Dwayne DeGraff
Party	Democratic	Independent
Leader since	January 11, 2021	January 14, 2019
Leader's seat	St. Thomas	St. Thomas
Last election	13	2
Seats before	13	2
Seats after	10	5
Seat change	3 ▼	3 ▲
Senate President before election
Novelle Francis
Democratic
Elected Senate President
Donna Frett-Gregory
Democratic

The Democratic Party of the Virgin Islands maintained their majority but lost several seats to Independent candidates. This resulted from a referendum on the Bryan administration, despite his good response to the COVID-19 pandemic and popularity among new candidates.

=== Democratic primary ===
The Democratic primary election was held on August 1, 2020. The top seven candidates who receive the highest votes would proceed to the general election. At-large Senator Steven Payne Sr. ran unopposed.

St. Thomas - St. John District
Party	Candidate	Votes	%
Democratic	Donna Frett-Gregory (incumbent)	1,422	14.22
Democratic	Athniel “Bobby” Thomas (incumbent)	1,108	11.08
Democratic	Milton Potter	1,099	10.99
Democratic	Carla Joseph	1,090	10.90
Democratic	Stedmann Hodge Jr. (incumbent)	1,084	10.84
Democratic	Marvin Blyden (incumbent)	982	9.82
Democratic	Jonathan P. Tucker Jr.	775	7.75
Democratic	Jean A. Forde	669	6.69
Democratic	Shirley Sadler	586	5.86
Democratic	Lawrence Boschulte	583	5.83
Democratic	Patrick Simeon Sprauve	537	5.37
Write-in		66	0.66
Total votes		10,001	

St. Croix district
Party	Candidate	Votes	%
Democratic	Kurt Vialet (incumbent)	1,825	16.23
Democratic	Novelle Francis (incumbent)	1,175	14.84
Democratic	Allison DeGazon (incumbent)	957	12.09
Democratic	Genevieve Whitaker	938	11.85
Democratic	Oakland Benta (incumbent)	920	11.62
Democratic	Javan James Sr. (incumbent)	914	11.54
Democratic	Kenneth Gittens (incumbent)	861	10.88
Democratic	Troy C. Williams	608	7.68
Democratic	Andrew John	186	2.35
Write-in		73	0.92
Total votes		7,917	

=== General election ===
Senator At-Large
Candidate	Party	Votes	%
Steven D. Payne Sr.	Democratic Party	8,201	94.71
Write in		458	5.29
Total		8,659	100.00
Total votes		18,130	–
Registered voters/turnout		53,341	33.99

St. Thomas/St. John
Candidate	Party	Votes	%
Donna Frett-Gregory	Democratic Party	4,855	10.34
Janelle K. Sarauw	Independent	4,827	10.28
Milton E. Potter	Democratic Party	4,481	9.54
Carla Joseph	Democratic Party	4,102	8.73
Marvin Blyden	Democratic Party	4,065	8.65
Alma Francis-Heyliger	Independent	4,017	8.55
Dwayne M. DeGraff	Independent	3,538	7.53
Athneil "Bobby" Thomas	Democratic Party	3,158	6.72
Stedmann Hodge Jr.	Democratic Party	3,149	6.70
Stephen "Smokey" Frett	Independent Citizens Movement	2,678	5.70
Jonathan P. Tucker Jr.	Democratic Party	2,499	5.32
Ray Fonseca	Independent	2,372	5.05
Irvin Pudna Mason Sr.	Independent	2,225	4.74
Wayne "Factsman" Adams	Independent Citizens Movement	733	1.56
Write in		272	0.58
Total		46,971	100.00
Total votes		9,322	–
Registered voters/turnout		27,754	33.59

St. Croix
Candidate	Party	Votes	%
Kurt Vialet	Democratic Party	4,852	10.98
Genevieve Whiktaker	Democratic Party	3,898	8.82
Novelle Francis	Democratic Party	3,799	8.60
Javan James Sr.	Democratic Party	3,735	8.45
Franklin D. Johnson	Independent	3,437	7.78
Samuel Carrion	Independent	3,394	7.68
Kenneth Gittens	Democratic Party	3,322	7.52
Oakland Benta	Democratic Party	3,199	7.24
Allison DeGazon	Democratic Party	2,965	6.71
Alicia "Chucky" Hansen	Independent	2,941	6.66
Michael J. Springer	Independent	2,426	5.49
Clint D. W. Ferris	Independent	1,754	3.97
Devin Carrington	Independent	1,710	3.87
Norman Baptiste	Independent	1,153	2.61
James P. G. "Moonark" Wakefield	Independent	986	2.23
John McCoy	Republican Party	460	1.04
Write in		158	0.36
Total		44,189	100.00
Total votes		8,808	–
Registered voters/turnout		25,587	34.42

== Delegate to the United States House of Representatives ==
2020 United States House of Representatives election in the United States Virgin Islands, at-large district
- November 3, 2020
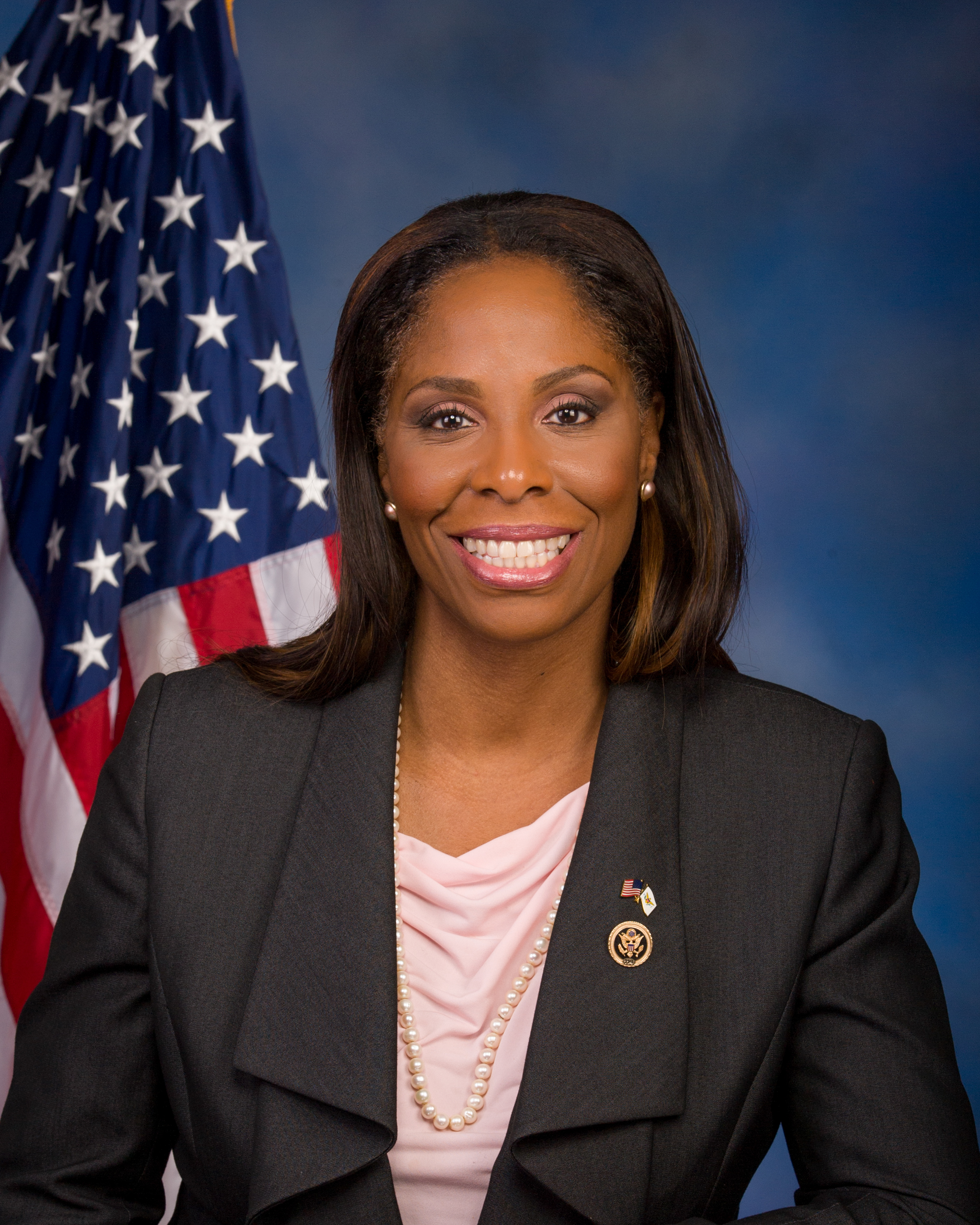
Candidate	Stacey Plaskett	Shekema George
Party	Democratic	Independent
Popular vote	13,620	1,782
Percentage	87.94%	11.51%
Delegate at-large before election
Stacey Plaskett
Democratic
Elected Delegate at-large
Stacey Plaskett
Democratic

The 2020 United States House of Representatives election in the United States Virgin Islands was held on Tuesday, November 3, 2020, to elect the non-voting Delegate to the United States House of Representatives from the United States Virgin Islands' at-large congressional district. The election coincided with the larger 2020 United States House of Representatives elections and the general election in the United States Virgin Islands.

The U.S. Virgin Island's non-voting delegate is elected for a two-year term in office. Incumbent delegate Stacey Plaskett, a Democrat who was first elected in 2014, was re-elected to a fourth term.

Candidate	Party	Votes	%
Stacey Plaskett	Democratic Party	13,620	87.94
Shekema George	Independent	1,782	11.51
Write in		85	0.55
Total		15,487	100.00
Total votes		18,130	–
Registered voters/turnout		53,341	33.99

== Exit Poll ==
St. Thomas - St. John Questionnaire
How supportive would you be of the development of a new hotel or casino that would create jobs for VI residents?
Very supportive: 44%, Somewhat supportive: 24%, Somewhat unsupportive: 10%, Very unsupportive: 10%, No opinion: 12%
How supportive are you of a Comprehensive Economic Development Strategy in which the US Virgin Islands government would support the private sector in rebuilding efforts and economic resiliency for the Virgin Islands, including upgrades to key infrastructure such as the Cyril E. King Airport and WAPA?
Very supportive: 61%, Somewhat supportive: 20%, Somewhat unsupportive: 2%, Very unsupportive: 1%, No opinion: 4%, Unsure: 11%
Do you believe we need more tourism or less tourism in the Virgin Islands?
More tourism: 60%, Less tourism: 18%, Unsure: 22%

2020 USVI general election poll St. Croix
How supportive would you be of the development of a new hotel or casino that would create jobs for VI residents?
Very supportive: 62%, Somewhat supportive: 23%, Somewhat unsupportive: 4%, Very unsupportive: 3%, Unsure: 8%
How supportive are you of a Comprehensive Economic Development Strategy in which the US Virgin Islands government would support the private sector in rebuilding efforts and economic resiliency for the Virgin Islands, including upgrades to key infrastructure such as the Cyril E. King Airport and WAPA?
Very supportive: 56%, Somewhat supportive: 24%, Somewhat unsupportive: 2%, Very unsupportive: 4%, No opinion: 5%, Unsure: 9%
Do you believe we need more tourism or less tourism in the Virgin Islands?
More tourism: 67%, Less tourism: 11%, Unsure: 22%

2020 USVI general election by demographic subgroup
Party
Republican Party	St. Thomas - St. John	5%	St. Croix	9%
Democratic Party	St. Thomas - St. John	57%	St. Croix	53%
Independent Citizens Movement	St. Thomas - St. John	5%	St. Croix	7%
Non affiliated	St. Thomas - St. John	24%	St. Croix	26%
Unsure	St. Thomas - St. John	9%	St. Croix	5%
Gender
Men	St. Thomas - St. John	48%	St. Croix	48%
Women	St. Thomas - St. John	52%	St. Croix	52%
Age
18–34 years old	St. Thomas - St. John	16%	St. Croix	16%
35–49 years old	St. Thomas - St. John	23%	St. Croix	23%
50–64 years old	St. Thomas - St. John	32%	St. Croix	32%
65+ years old	St. Thomas - St. John	29%	St. Croix	29%
