= 2022 United States Virgin Islands legislative election =

- November 8, 2022

All 15 seats of the Legislature of the Virgin Islands
	Majority party	Minority party
Leader	Novelle Francis	Dwayne DeGraff
Party	Democratic	Independent
Leader's seat	St. Croix district	St. Thomas/St. John district
Seats before	10	5
Seats after	11	4
Seat change	1 ▲	1 ▼
President before election
Donna Frett-Gregory
Democratic
Elected President
Novelle Francis
Democratic

The 2022 United States Virgin Islands legislative election took place on November 8, 2022, to elect all fifteen seats in the Legislature of the Virgin Islands. The election coincided with the 2022 gubernatorial race and the 2022 United States elections.

In the 2022 elections, the Democratic Party of the Virgin Islands gained one vacant seat from Independent Senator Janelle Sarauw who ran for lieutenant governor.

== Democratic primary ==
The Democratic primary was held on August 6, 2022. Newly appointed At-Large senator Angel Bolques Jr. ran for a full term in office, replacing ousted Steven D. Payne Sr. He defeated Payne for his seat.

Newcomer Ray Fonseca from St. Thomas/St. John proceeded to the general election.

=== Results ===
At Large
Candidate	Party	Votes	%
Angel Bolques Jr. (incumbent)	Democratic Party	3,777	77.22
Steven D. Payne Sr.	Democratic Party	1,067	21.82
Write in		47	0.96
Total		4,891	100.00

St. Thomas/St. John
Candidate	Party	Votes	%
Donna Frett-Gregory (incumbent)	Democratic Party	2,211	17.03
Milton Potter (incumbent)	Democratic Party	2,141	16.49
Carla Joseph (incumbent)	Democratic Party	1,656	12.76
Marvin Blyden (incumbent)	Democratic Party	1,631	12.56
Joel S. Browne Connors	Democratic Party	1,105	8.51
Lawrence Boschulte	Democratic Party	1,095	8.43
Ray Fonseca	Democratic Party	1,095	8.43
Shenelle Fina Francis	Democratic Party	995	7.66
Ke’Shawn K.J. Louis	Democratic Party	599	4.61
Teofilo Ciprian	Democratic Party	371	2.86
Write in		83	0.64
Total		12,982	100.00

St. Croix
Candidate	Party	Votes	%
Kenneth Gittens (incumbent)	Democratic Party	1,771	14.23
Novelle Francis (incumbent)	Democratic Party	1,732	13.92
Marise C. James (incumbent)	Democratic Party	1,693	13.60
Diane T. Capehart	Democratic Party	1,477	11.87
Nemmy Williams Jackson	Democratic Party	1,296	10.41
Javan James Sr. (incumbent)	Democratic Party	1,241	9.97
Genevieve Whitaker (incumbent)	Democratic Party	1,229	9.88
Hubert Frederick	Democratic Party	1,220	9.80
Troy C. Williams	Democratic Party	751	6.04
Write in		34	0.27
Total		12,444	100.00

== General election ==
=== Polling ===
Poll source	District	Date(s) administered	Sample size	Margin of error	Angel Bolques (D)	Sherry Ann Francis (I)	Undecided
VI Tech Stack	At-Large	September 7–13, 2022	650	± 3.82%	42%	21%	36%

Poll source	School district	Date(s) administered	Sherry Ann Francis (I)	Angel Bolques (D)
IEKHS	St. Thomas/St. John	October 21, 2022	196	192

Poll source	School district	Date(s) administered	Donna Frett-Gregory	Marvin Blyden	Carla Joseph	Ray Foncesa	Alma Francis-Helyiger	Milton E. Potter	Dewayne DeGraff	Joel S. Browne Connors	Dawn L. Henry	Lawerence Boschulte	Margaret Price
IEKHS	St. Thomas/St. John	October 21, 2022	223	220	208	184	164	164	146	126	124	97	96

=== Results ===
At Large
Candidate	Party	Votes	%
Angel Bolques Jr.	Democratic Party	8,776	50.49
Sherry-Ann Francis	Independent	8,532	49.09
Write in		72	0.41
Total		17,380	100.00
Total votes		22,557	–
Registered voters/turnout		39,910	56.52

St. Thomas/St. John
Candidate	Party	Votes	%
Donna Frett-Gregory	Democratic Party	6,306	12.98
Milton E. Potter	Democratic Party	6,004	12.36
Marvin Blyden	Democratic Party	5,497	11.32
Dwayne M. DeGraff	Independent	5,388	11.09
Carla Joseph	Democratic Party	5,179	10.66
Alma Francis-Heyliger	Independent	4,897	10.08
Ray Fonseca	Democratic Party	4,083	8.41
Joel S. Browne Connors	Democratic Party	3,576	7.36
Dawn Lisa Henry	Independent	3,111	6.41
Lawrence Boschulte	Democratic Party	2,791	5.75
Margaret Price	Independent Citizens Movement	1,472	3.03
Write in		266	0.55
Total		48,570	100.00

St. Croix
Candidate	Party	Votes	%
Kenneth Gittens	Democratic Party	5,529	10.16
Novelle Francis	Democratic Party	5,262	9.67
Franklin D. Johnson	Independent	4,796	8.81
Samuel Carrion	Independent	4,599	8.45
Marise C. James	Democratic Party	4,472	8.22
Javan James Sr.	Democratic Party	4,278	7.86
Diane T. Capehart	Democratic Party	3,686	6.77
Nemmy Williams-Jackson	Democratic Party	3,510	6.45
Genevieve Whitaker	Democratic Party	3,402	6.25
Michael J. Springer	Independent	2,467	4.53
Devin Carrington	Independent	2,384	4.38
Patricia M. James	Independent	2,274	4.18
Norman Baptiste	Independent	1,869	3.43
Leonardo Carrion Sr.	Independent	1,394	2.56
Tyrone Molyneaux	Independent Citizens Movement	1,069	1.96
Shalima A. Edwards	Independent	1,032	1.90
Julian S. Viera	Independent	836	1.54
James P. G. "Moonark" Wakefield	Independent	757	1.39
Marilyn T. Hodge	Independent	670	1.23
Write in		135	0.25
Total		54,421	100.00
