= 34th Virgin Islands Legislature =

Virgin Islands legislative session

34th Legislature of the Virgin Islands

Leadership
- President: Donna Frett-Gregory (D)
- Vice President: Novelle Francis (D)
- Majority Leader: Marvin Blyden (D) (until December 24, 2021)
- Minority Leader: Dwayne DeGraff (I)

Structure
- Seats: 15
- Length of term: 2 years

The 34th Virgin Islands Legislature was a meeting of the Legislature of the Virgin Islands. It convened in Charlotte Amalie on January 11, 2021, during the third year of Albert Bryan's governorship and ended on January 9, 2023.

In the 2020 elections, the Democratic Party of the Virgin Islands retained their majority although reduced from the 33rd Legislature.

== Major events ==
- January 11, 2021: The 34th legislative session began as senators take office.
- January 25, 2021: Governor Bryan delivered the State of the Territory Address.
- December 23, 2021: Senate voted 12–1 on Res. 34-0185 to suspend Senator Marvin Blyden and remove him from the position of majority leader for his failure to quarantine after testing positive for COVID-19.
- January 24, 2022: Governor Bryan delivered the State of the Territory Address.
- June 13, 2022: Senate President Donna Frett-Gregory calls for federal investigation into letter sent through USPS, threatening all 14 members of the body except Senator Steven Payne Sr.
- July 20, 2022: Senate voted 14–1 on Res. 34-0287 to expel Senator Steven Payne Sr. from the 34th Legislature following reports of sexual accusations made by three women.
- July 25, 2022: Angel Bolques Jr. replaces Senator Steven Payne Sr. as senator at-large.
- December 29, 2022: Senate voted 11–1 on bill no. 34-0345 to legalize recreational marijuana use in the territory.

== Major legislation ==
=== Enacted ===
- March 15, 2021: Act 8841: An Act extending the State of Emergency in the U.S. Virgin Islands based on the COVID-19 Pandemic for an additional 60 days from March 8, 2021, to May 7, 2021.
- May 19, 2021: Act 8444: An Act amending title 29 Virgin Islands Code, chapter 3, subchapter I, section 235 (c), relating to the time period within which the Zoning Administrator must act on a building permit application submitted to the Department of Planning and Natural Resources to set time limits; requiring the Department to implement an Electronic Permitting System; amending chapter 5 section 296 relating to fees and fines for building permits to require that 3 percent of the fees collected under that section be deposited into the Department's Reclamation Fund for maintaining the electric permitting system; and amending title 12, section 911(f)(4) relating to the Natural Resources Reclamation Fund to include 3 percent of the fees collected in 29 V.I.C. § 296 as a funding source for the Natural Resources Reclamation Fund. Act 8845: An Act amending title 3 Virgin Islands Code, chapter 5, subchapter 1, section 65a, subsections (a), (c), (d), and (e) relating to filling vacancies on boards and commissions to authorize the Governor to nominate persons to boards and commissions sixty days before the expiration of the term of an existing board or commission member; to clarify the limitation on the number of governmental boards and commissions on which commissioners and directors of the Virgin Islands Government may serve, while serving on the board or commission of any autonomous or semi-autonomous agency, to grant the Governor greater discretion in appointing statutorily designated commissions and other agency executive to boards and commission by authoring the Governor to appoint alternative representative heads; of executive agencies; adding subsection (f) to allow off-island members to serve on boards and commissions and providing for other related purposes. Act 8849: An Act appropriating $675,500 from the Community Facility Trust Fund to the Caribbean Drag Racing Association for restoration of facilities at the St. Croix Motor Sports Complex, making an appropriation and for other related purposes.
- August 3, 2021: An Act amending the Virgin Islands Code title 3, section 273(a) relating to the Public Services Commission to establish the Commission as a semiautonomous agency; amending title 30 section 1 to eliminate certain businesses from regulation as a utility and to subject the Waste Management Authority to regulation; authorizing WAPA to hire a turnaround management company; adding chapter 9 to provide for resolution of customer complaints against wireless telecommunication providers; and for other purposes related to the Public Services Commission, and WAPA.
- August 16, 2021: Act 8458: An Act amending title 33 Virgin Islands Code, subtitle 1, part 1, chapter 5, section 91 relating to the payment of fuel taxes to change the time for remittance of the tax to the Bureau of Internal Revenue; and for other related purposes. Act 8469: An Act amending Act 8365, the Fiscal Year 2021 Executive Budget, and Act No. 8348, the Legislature's Fiscal Year 2021 Budget, to restore the 8% reduction in salaries to the employees of the Government of the Virgin Islands and for other related purposes.
- February 8, 2022: Act 8540: An Act amending title 29 Virgin Islands Code, by adding chapter 24 to authorize the sale of the Matching Fund Receipts and create a new entity named the "Matching Fund Special Purpose Securitization Corporation" to: (1) acquire during the Transfer Period all of the Virgin Islands Government's right, title, and interest in the Matching Fund Receipts to be paid to or for the account of the Government by the United States Treasury and the Related Rights, (2) issue Matching Fund Securitization Bonds and the Residual Certificate in order to pay the purchase price therefor and as otherwise authorized under the act, and (3) direct the Secretary and the United States Department of Interior to pay the Matching Fund Receipts directly into the Deposit Account; to approve the issuance by the Virgin Islands Public Finance Authority or other entity of the GERS Funding Note to the Government for deposit as an in-kind contribution to the GERS; to ratify the amendments to the rum company agreements; repealing and replacing Act Nos 8329 and 8330; and for other related purposes.
- April 11, 2022: Act 8553: The Virgin Islands CROWN Act Act 8546: An Act amending title 34 Virgin Islands Code by adding a chapter 4 to be known as "The Responsible Fatherhood Act of 2022" Act 8542: An Act amending the Virgin Islands Code, title 3, chapter 29, relating to notaries, notarial officers, and notarial acts by adding subchapter III enacting the "Virgin Islands Uniform Law on Notarial Acts (2022)"; and amending and repealing conflicting laws on notaries public.
- August 8, 2022: Act 8609: An Act amending the Virgin Islands Code, title 3, chapter 18, section 302 relating the duties of the Department of Sports, Parks and Recreation to include the duty to develop neighborhood parks or recreation areas primarily designed to provide facilities for team, recreational or individual sports; amending title 3, chapter 22 section 401 to direct the Department to identify, supervise, administer, manage, regulate and control all sites within the Territorial Parks System; amending title 32, chapter 2 to establish the Division of Territorial Parks and Protected Areas within the Department of Planning and Natural Resources to establish and maintain a Territorial Parks System; amending title 33, chapter 111 to establish in the Treasury of the Virgin Islands The Territorial Parks System Revolving Fund and the Recreational Parks Revolving Fund; repealing title 3, section 308, title 32, chapter 4; and for other related purposes.

=== Proposed (but not enacted) ===
- Bill No. 34-0016: An Act naming the future customs and border protection building to be constructed at the Urman V. Fredericks Marine Terminal in Red Hook, St. Thomas, “The Louis W. Harrigan, Jr. Customs and Border Protection Building”.
- Bill No. 34-0038: An Act appropriating $2 million to the Department of Justice for its White-Collar Crimes Unit to prosecute white-collar crimes in the Virgin Islands.
- Bill No. 34-0386: An act posthumously honoring and commending the late Wayne "Facts Man" Adams for his contributions as a historian, activist, publisher, businessman, and independent media correspondent, and for his many contributions in his role in educating the people of the Virgin Islands and the Caribbean about their history.

== Vetoed ==
December 6, 2021: Bill No. 34-0168, eliminates the requirement for Caravelle Hotel casino owned by VIGL, to build a 400-capacity banquet hall.

== Major Resolutions ==
- Res No. 1879: A resolution organizing and establishing the Majority Caucus, electing the officers, appointing the chairpersons, vice-chairpersons and members of the standing committees of the Thirty-Fourth Legislature of the Virgin Islands.
- Res No. 1880: A resolution adopting the Rules of the Thirty-Fourth Legislature of the Virgin Islands.
- Res No. 1882: A resolution honoring and commending Mr. Hillary "Baga" Rezende for his many contributions to steel pan music and his dedicated service to the people of the Virgin Islands.
- Res No. 1883: A resolution honoring and commending St. Clair Alphonso "Whadablee" DeSilvia for his invaluable contribution to continued development of Calypso music in the Virgin Islands.
- Res No. 1884: A resolution honoring and commending Holland L. Redfield II posthumously for his expansive contributions to the island of St. Croix and the entire Virgin Islands community as a whole, through his roles in various areas of service in the territory and awarding him the Virgin Islands Medal of Honor for Public Service posthumously.
- Res No. 1885: A resolution to impose sanctions against Senator Marvin A. Blyden for violating the Standards of ethical Conduct of the Thirty-fourth Legislature of the Virgin Islands.
- Res No. 1887: A resolution honoring and commending Kemit-Amon Lewis for his outstanding service and contributions to the Marine Science industry in the Virgin Islands.
- Res No. 1888: A resolution honoring and commending Eugene "Genix" Thomas posthumously for his outstanding contributions to the Virgin Islands community as a baseball, softball, and life coach.
- Res No. 1889: A resolution honoring and commending Alvin Delano Burke, Sr. posthumously for his service and contributions to the sport of basketball, horse racing and to the people of the Virgin Islands.
- Res No. 1891: A resolution to impose sanctions against the Honorable Senator Steven D. Payne, Sr., for violations of the Code of Ethical Conduct of the Thirty-fourth Legislature of the Virgin Islands and for violations of the Legislature's zero-tolerance policy against sexual harassment.
- Res No. 1892: A resolution to reorganize the Thirty-Fourth Legislature of the Virgin Islands to fill a vacancy in the Majority Caucus.
- Res No. 1893: A resolution honoring and commending José Julio Martínez, better known as Papi Love for his outstanding contributions as a radio talk show host, educating and entertaining the people of the Virgin Islands.
- Res No. 1894: A resolution to honor and commend Command Sergeant Major Charles David, Retired, for his service to the Virgin Islands National Guard.
- Res No. 1895: A resolution honoring and commending the Reverend Dr. George E. Phillips for his invaluable contribution to the Gospel, ministry, and the people of the Virgin Islands.
- Res No. 1896: A resolution petitioning the President of the United States of America to issue a posthumous pardon to Rothschild Francis for his unjust conviction for the federal crimes of criminal libel, contempt, and embezzlement.
- Res No. 1897: A resolution to posthumously honor and commend Roselin Maud McFarlane for her contributions to the Virgin Islands Community and specifically as an advocate of independent living for people with disabilities.
- Res No. 1899: A resolution expressing the support of the Legislature of the Virgin Islands for U.S. House Resolution 279, acknowledging that the U.S. Supreme Court's Decision in the Insular Cases and the "Territorial Incorporation Doctrine" are contrary to the text and the history of the United States Constitution as they rest on racial views and stereotypes from the era of Plessy v. Ferguson that have long been rejected as contrary to the United States' most basic constitutional and democratic principles, and should be rejected as having no place in United States Constitutional Law.

== Party summary ==
Affiliation	Party (shading indicates majority caucus)		Total
Affiliation	Democratic	Independent	Total
End of previous legislature	13	2	15
Begin (January 11, 2021)	9	6	15
May 13, 2022	10	5	15

== Leadership ==
=== Presiding ===
- President of the Senate: Donna Frett-Gregory (D), from January 11, 2021
- Vice President: Novelle Francis (D), from January 11, 2021

==== Majority (Democratic) ====
- Majority Leader: Marvin Blyden (D), from January 11, 2021
- Secretary: Genevieve Whitaker (D), from January 11, 2021
- Intergovernmental Territorial Affairs Secretary: Novelle Francis (D), from January 11, 2021
- Liaison to Congress: Marvin Blyden (D), from January 11, 2021
- Liaison to the Department of Interior & Office of Insular Affairs: Genevieve Whitaker (D), from January 11, 2021
- Liaison to the White House: Kenneth Gittens (D), from January 11, 2021

==== Majority Caucus ====
- Senators Marvin Blyden, Novelle Francis, Kenneth Gittens, Carla Joseph, Donna Frett-Gregory, Javan James Sr., Milton Potter.

== Members ==
District	Name	Party	Took office
At-large	Steven D. Payne Sr. (Until July 25, 2022)	Democratic	2019
At-large	Angel Bolques Jr. (From July 25, 2022)	Democratic	2022
St. Croix	Franklin Johnson	Independent	2021
St. Croix	Kurt Vialet	Democratic	2015
St. Croix	Javan E. James, Sr.	Independent	2019
St. Croix	Kenneth Gittens	Democratic	2019
St. Croix	Genevieve Whitaker	Democratic	2021
St. Croix	Novelle Francis	Democratic	2015
St. Croix	Samuel Carrion	Independent	2021
St. Thomas/ St. John	Alma Francis-Heyliger	Independent	2021
St. Thomas/ St. John	Carla Joseph	Democratic	2021
St. Thomas/ St. John	Donna Frett-Gregory	Democratic	2019
St. Thomas/ St. John	Dwayne DeGraff	Independent	2017
St. Thomas/ St. John	Janelle Sarauw	Independent	2017
St. Thomas/ St. John	Marvin Blyden	Democratic	2015
St. Thomas/ St. John	Milton Potter	Democratic	2021

== See also ==
- List of Virgin Islands Legislatures
