= 2026 United States Virgin Islands gubernatorial election =

- November 3, 2026
- Turnout: 20,047
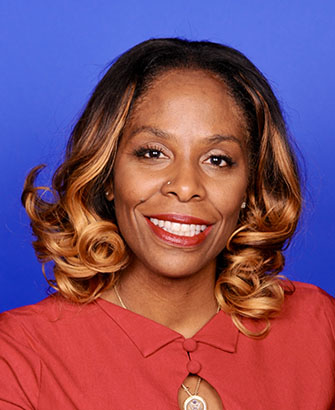

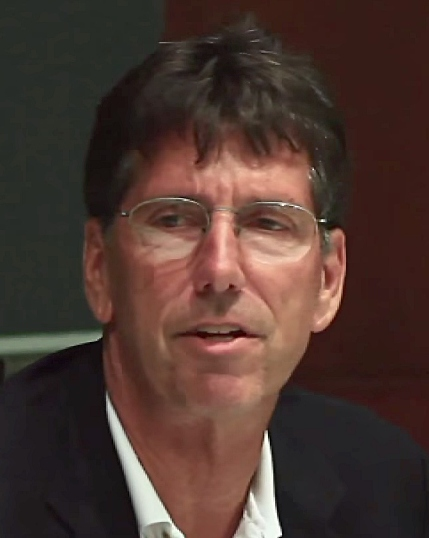
Nominee	Stacey Plaskett	Adlah Donastorg Jr.
Party	Democratic	Independent
Running mate	Milton E. Potter	Positive Nelson
Popular vote	11,865	2,507
Percentage	62.8%	13.3%
Nominee	Oakland Benta	Warren Mosler
Party	Independent	Independent
Running mate	Merwin Potter	Collin Robertson
Popular vote	2,273	1,293
Percentage	12.0%	6.8%
Governor before election
Albert Bryan
Democratic
Elected Governor
Stacey Plaskett
Democratic

The 2026 U.S. Virgin Islands gubernatorial election took place on November 3, 2026, to elect the governor of the United States Virgin Islands. Primary elections were held on August 1, 2026, during which Plaskett won a plurality against two Democratic challengers, Lieutenant Governor Tregenza Roach and former legislator Donna Frett-Gregory. Incumbent Democratic governor Albert Bryan was term-limited and unable to run for re-election.

Democratic congressional delegate Stacey Plaskett overwhelmingly defeated a field of four independent candidates. Plaskett is the first woman elected governor of the U.S. territory.

== Democratic primary ==
=== Candidates ===
==== Nominee ====
- Stacey Plaskett, congressional delegate from the United States Virgin Islands' at-large congressional district (2015–present)
  - Running mate: Milton E. Potter, president of the Virgin Islands Legislature (2025–present) from the St. Thomas-St. John district (2021–present)

==== Eliminated in primary ====
- Donna Frett-Gregory, former president of the Virgin Islands Legislature (2021–2023) from the St. Thomas-St. John district (2019–2025)
  - Running mate: Rodney Moorehead, principal of the St. Croix Educational Complex
- Tregenza Roach, lieutenant governor of the United States Virgin Islands (2019–present)
  - Running mate: Novelle Francis, former president of the Virgin Islands Legislature (2019–2021, 2023–2025) from the St. Croix district (2015–present)

=== Endorsements ===
Stacey Plaskett

Executive branch officials

- Kamala Harris, former vice president of the United States (2021–2025)

U.S. representatives

- Jasmine Crockett, TX-30 (2023–present)
- Jim Clyburn, SC-06 (1993–present)

Territorial officials

- Osbert Potter, former lieutenant governor of the United States Virgin Islands (2015–2019) (Independent)

Territorial legislators

- Franklin D. Johnson, member of the Virgin Islands Legislature from the St. Croix district (2021–present) (Independent)

Labor unions

- USVI Area Labor Federation

Organizations

- Elect Democratic Women
Tregenza Roach

Territorial officials

- Donna Christian-Christensen, former delegate to the U.S. House of Representatives (1997–2015)

Territorial legislators

- Donald "Ducks" Cole, former member of the Virgin Islands Legislature from the St. Thomas-St. John district

=== Polling ===
Hypothetical polling

with Kurt Vialet

Poll source	Date(s) administered	Sample size	Margin of error	Kurt Vialet (D)	Stacey Plaskett (D)	Tregenza Roach (D)	Donna Frett-Gregory (D)	Other candidates/not listed	No response/undecided
Rattan Poling Service	February 10-March 28, 2026	500	4.0%	19.6%	18.8%	9.4%	8.0%	25.8% (Note: "Other Candidate/Not Listed" with 18.0%, Warren Mosler (I) with 2.8%, Positive Nelson (I) with 2.6%, Jed John-Hope with 2.4%, Gustav James (I) with 2.2%, Randolph Bennett with 2.0%, Adlah Donastorg with 1.6%, Stephen Frett with 1.6%, and Almando Liburd with 1.2%)	3%

=== Results ===
2026 Democratic gubernatorial primary results
Party	Candidate	Votes	%
Democratic	Stacey Plaskett Milton E. Potter	4,727	46.99
Democratic	Tregenza Roach Novelle Francis	3,197	31.78
Democratic	Donna Frett-Gregory Rodney Moorehead	2,091	20.79
Write-in		45	0.45
Total votes		10,060	100.00

==== Saint Croix ====
2026 Democratic gubernatorial primary results in Saint Croix
Party	Candidate	Votes	%
Democratic	Stacey Plaskett Milton E. Potter	2,720	57.00
Democratic	Tregenza Roach Novelle Francis	1,237	25.92
Democratic	Donna Frett-Gregory Rodney Moorehead	796	16.68
Write-in		19	0.40
Total votes		4,772	100.00

==== Saint Thomas and Saint John ====
2026 Democratic gubernatorial primary results in Saint Thomas and Saint John
Party	Candidate	Votes	%
Democratic	Tregenza Roach Novelle Francis	1,817	37.94
Democratic	Stacey Plaskett Milton E. Potter	1,773	37.02
Democratic	Donna Frett-Gregory Rodney Moorehead	1,179	24.61
Write-in		20	0.43
Total votes		4,789	100.00%

== Independents ==
=== Candidates ===
==== Declared ====
- Oakland Benta, Virgin Islands senator from the St. Croix district (2019–2021)
  - Running mate: Merwin Potter, former director of the Virgin Islands Fire Service (2004–2006)
- Adlah Donastorg Jr., Virgin Islands senator from the St. Thomas-St. John District (1995–2011)
  - Running mate: Positive Nelson, former Virgin Islands senator from the St. Croix district
- Gustav James, former commissioner of the Virgin Islands Department of Public Works (2014–2017)
  - Running mate: Randolph Bennett, former commissioner of the Virgin Islands Department of Property and Procurement (2015–2017)
- Warren Mosler, hedge fund executive, financier, and perennial candidate
  - Running mate: Colin Robertson

== General election ==
=== Post-primary endorsements ===
Stacey Plaskett (D)

Organizations

- Democratic Governors Association
