= List of presidents of the Virgin Islands Legislature =

This is a list of presidents of the Virgin Islands Legislature:

Legislature	Name	Entered office	Left office	Party
1st Virgin Islands Legislature	Walter I.M. Hodge	1955	1956	Unity Party
2nd Virgin Islands Legislature	Aubrey A. Anduze	1957	1958	Unity Party
3rd Virgin Islands Legislature	Walter I.M. Hodge	1959	1960	Unity Party
4th Virgin Islands Legislature	Walter I.M. Hodge	1961	1962	Unity Party
5th Virgin Islands Legislature	Earle B. Ottley	1963	1964	Unity-Democratic Party
6th Virgin Islands Legislature	Earle B. Ottley	1965	1966	Unity-Democratic Party
7th Virgin Islands Legislature	Earle B. Ottley	1967	1968	Unity-Democratic Party
8th Virgin Islands Legislature	John L. Maduro	1969	1970	Democratic
9th Virgin Islands Legislature	John L. Maduro	1971	1972	Democratic
10th Virgin Islands Legislature	Claude A. Molloy	1973	1974	Independent Citizens Movement
11th Virgin Islands Legislature	Elmo D. Roebuck	1975	1976	Democratic
12th Virgin Islands Legislature	Elmo D. Roebuck	1977	1978	Democratic
13th Virgin Islands Legislature	Elmo D. Roebuck	1979	1980	Democratic
14th Virgin Islands Legislature	Ruby M. Rouss	1981	1982	Democratic
15th Virgin Islands Legislature	Elmo D. Roebuck	January 1983	July 21, 1983	Democratic
15th Virgin Islands Legislature	Hugo Dennis, Jr.	July 21, 1983	1984	Democratic
16th Virgin Islands Legislature	Derek M. Hodge	1985	1986	Democratic
17th Virgin Islands Legislature	Ruby M. Rouss	January 1987	March 9, 1987	Democratic
17th Virgin Islands Legislature	Iver A. Stridiron	March 9, 1987	1988	Democratic
18th Virgin Islands Legislature	Bent Lawaetz	1989	1990	Democratic
19th Virgin Islands Legislature	Virdin C. Brown	1991	1992	Independent Citizens Movement
20th Virgin Islands Legislature	Bingley G. Richardson	1993	1994	Democratic
21st Virgin Islands Legislature	Almando "Rocky" Liburd	1995	1996	Independent Citizens Movement
22nd Virgin Islands Legislature	Lorraine L. Berry	1997	1998	Democratic
23rd Virgin Islands Legislature	Vargrave A. Richards	1999	2000	Democratic
24th Virgin Islands Legislature	Almando "Rocky" Liburd	2001	2002	Independent Citizens Movement
25th Virgin Islands Legislature	David S. Jones	2003	2005	Democratic
26th Virgin Islands Legislature	Lorraine L. Berry	2005	2007	Democratic
27th Virgin Islands Legislature	Usie R. Richards	2007	2009	Democratic
28th Virgin Islands Legislature	Louis Patrick Hill	2009	2011	Democratic
29th Virgin Islands Legislature	Ronald E. Russell	2011	2013	Democratic
30th Virgin Islands Legislature	Shawn-Micheal Malone	2013	2015	Democratic
31st Virgin Islands Legislature	Neville James	January 12, 2015	2017	Democratic
32nd Virgin Islands Legislature	Myron D. Jackson	2017	2019	Democratic
33rd Legislature	Kenneth Gittens	January 14, 2019	May 15, 2019	Democratic
33rd Virgin Islands Legislature	Novelle E. Francis	May 15, 2019	January 11, 2021	Democratic
34th Virgin Islands Legislature	Donna Frett-Gregory	January 11, 2021	January 9, 2023	Democratic
35th Virgin Islands Legislature	Novelle E. Francis	January 2023	January 2025	Democratic
36th Virgin Islands Legislature	Milton E. Potter	January 2025	present	Democratic

== See also ==
- List of Virgin Islands Legislatures

== Sources ==
- Official website of the Virgin Islands Legislature
