= The Equality Act (Virgin Islands) =

The Equality Act is a law passed by the 34th Virgin Islands Legislature which prohibits discrimination based on sexual orientation or gender identity as an unlawful discriminatory practice. The bill was signed into law by Governor Albert Bryan on January 19, 2023.

== Overview ==
It was first introduced by Senator Janelle Sarauw in June 2022. As a member of the LGBT community, she have explained her intent of the bill was to address discrimination felt by others who do not present themselves as non-heterosexual.

== See also ==
- LGBT rights in the United States Virgin Islands
