= Rothschild Francis =

Virgin Islands activist (1891–1963)

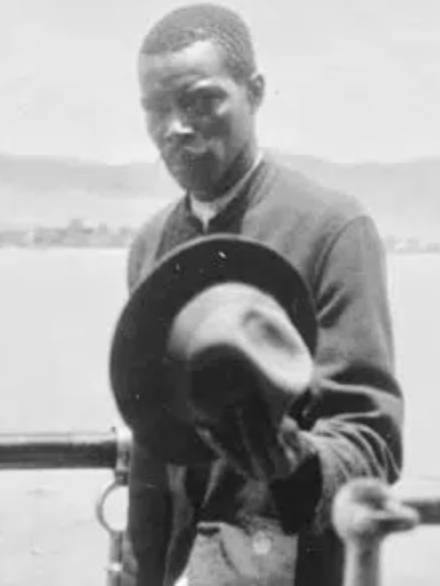
Rothschild Francis, pictured in the early 1920s

Rothschild "Polly" Francis (1891–1963) was a self-educated activist in the Virgin Islands. He fought for rights in the press, citizenship for Virgin Islanders, and racial equality. To advance these goals he created a newspaper, The Emancipator, spoke in front of a Senate Committee, and engaged in civil disobedience. His influence still has a large impact on the U.S. Virgin Islands today.

Rothschild Francis was born in 1891 in Saint Thomas of the Virgin Islands while they were under the control of Denmark. He lived there through the U.S. acquisition of the Virgin Islands, moved to New York in 1931, and died in 1963. He created The Emancipator in 1921, a newspaper which pushed for social justice and civil liberties in the U.S. Virgin Islands.

== Life ==
=== Early years ===
Rothschild Francis was born in the Danish Virgin Islands in 1891. He witnessed the purchase of the islands by the United States from Denmark and, being an enthusiast of the United States Constitution and the Founding Fathers, was excited for his people to become a part of the nation. Unfortunately, Rothschild Francis would soon witness and become subject to racial discrimination, hatred, and inequality that the United States military government brought with them. He soon realized that U.S. politicians had no intention of giving the Virgin Islanders full citizenship. He refused to give up his faith in the political ideals of the U.S. Constitution and Founding Fathers – a theme which would continue throughout his life.

=== Activism ===
Francis' first direct confrontation with the U.S. Naval government in the Virgin Islands took place when he won a seat on the Colonial Council of the Virgin Islands. One of his first actions was to write a resolution requesting the removal of the naval government. Francis constantly pointed out the hypocrisy of American rulers in the islands, claiming that they rarely kept to the Constitution which they held so dear. His ardent support of the Constitution, as well as other traditional and foundational American ideals, alienated him from many of the mainland civil rights advocates of his day. He did have friends, W.E.B. Dubois being one of the most well-known. He also worked with Virgin Islanders in New York. Nevertheless, between difficulties gaining supporters on the Virgin Islands and his political disagreements with other activists, he often found himself working alone.

Rothschild Francis focused a great deal on ensuring an entirely civil government in the Virgin Islands, often more than ending racism, at least in the beginning. Part of the reason for this was because he did not see as much racism as mainland activists, at least not until after the naval government was instituted. He steadfastly believed that through the correct application of democracy – racism, and racial hatred, would die out. Many of his arguments were focused on political hypocrisy, and the whole Constitution, rather than civil rights exclusively. As time went on, his perspective widened, and his arguments considered the massive obstacle racism presented to true democracy.

In his quest for rights, Francis clashed frequently with American officials, none more so than George Washington Williams, a naval judge on the islands. These clashes increased Francis's understanding of the American racial situation as the two went head-to-head in court, in letters published in newspapers, and over every civil issue conceivable. In an incident involving a police officer and Francis’ newspaper, Francis was sent to jail by Williams, after being denied a trial by jury. The American Civil Liberties Union appealed his case, and Williams’ decision was promptly overturned, although he would soon send Francis to jail again in another dispute.

=== Self-exile and death ===
Williams retained too much power over Francis for Francis’ comfort. This power resulted in Francis being dragged in and out of jail on trumped up charges for years, until he eventually left the Virgin Islands for New York City in 1931. He would never return. He died in 1963, having been absent from the public eye for decades. However, he made a great impact on Virgin Islanders, an impact still recognized today.

== United States Navy rule on Virgin Islands ==
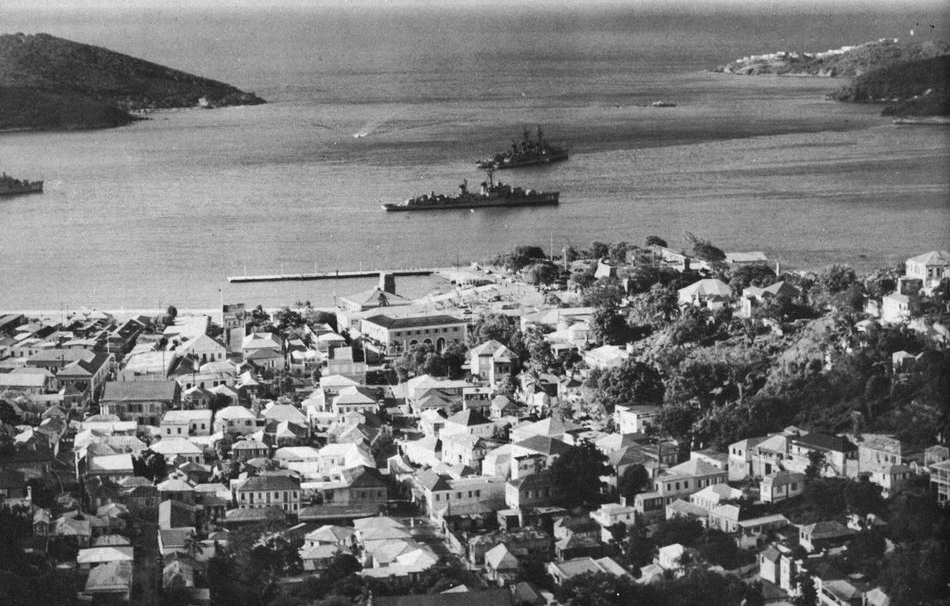
St. Thomas, Francis' birthplace, pictured in March 1956

Rothschild Francis is mainly recognized for his efforts in fighting back against U.S. Naval rule practices in the U.S. Virgin Islands that negatively affected African-Americans. He lived during the transition from Danish to American rule and focused on civil rights activism during this time period.

=== Beginning of U.S. Navy rule on Virgin Islands ===
The United States acquired the Danish West Indies in 1917 during World War I in order to establish a stronger naval presence in the Caribbean area. Due to the military motivations behind the purchase of the islands, the United States Navy established a government. While this was meant to be a temporary installment, the naval government remained intact following the end of the war. The main focus of the island's U.S. leaders was economic reform through education, private enterprises, and tourism.

Admiral James Harrison Oliver was named as the first United States Governor of the Virgin Islands in 1917 and served in this capacity until 1919. During his two years as Governor, Oliver mainly focused on the improvement of education throughout the islands. Although the total population of the islands decreased over the first ten years of U.S. rule, total public school enrollment and total expenditures for public schools increased in large margins. The results of the increased funding proved successful as Virgin Island student tested at a much higher level than African American students in the Southern United States."

=== Opinion on U.S. Navy rule ===
Rothschild Francis was in support of the educational funding and health improvements made by U.S. Navy rule, and even addressed this in an appearance before the United States Senate Committee on Territories and Insular Possessions in March of 1924, but he believed that the islands should be run by a civil government, and not a military one. Francis said in that meeting, “When our children get this beautiful education they are getting able also to raise their voices in protest against the system that allows aliens to still have control of the country where we are born. I want to impress the committee with the fact that this is a most serious thing to us, where these men have political rights and we have none. We feel we are political peons under the American flag, and aliens have the right to dictate us. We ask the committee to take that fact under consideration and to see that we have a form of government established in those Virgin Islands compatible with the American conception of government, giving the masses a say in the government.”

== The Emancipator ==
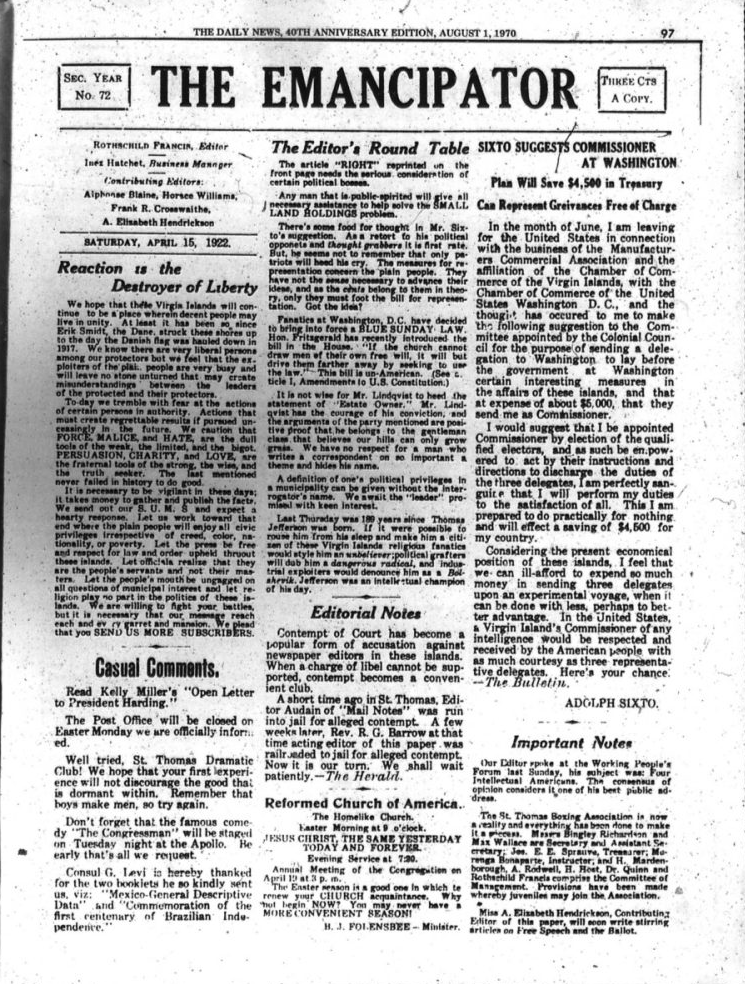
Cover of The Emancipator on its issue released on April 15, 1922

The Emancipator was a newspaper created by Rothschild Francis in 1921 that focused on fighting social injustice and advocating for the working class in the U.S. Virgin Islands. Francis became well-known, for good and bad, among Virgin Islanders through his editorials he regularly published which attacked local military and political leaders. Throughout The Emancipator's run, it received multiple threats of censorship from local island officials. As Francis garnered increased notice, governmental authorities started mentioning him and fellow instigators in their communications to the President of the United States. In return, Francis wrote to President Calvin Coolidge in 1923 saying, "Politically we are peons...our people are without voice in the government that they form a part."

=== Accused of criminal libel ===
For the next year, many islanders wrote to the paper in support of Francis' writings, but in 1924, Francis was accused of criminal libel, taken to court without the use of a jury, and sentenced to 30 days of imprisonment by Judge George Washington Williams. The sentencing came in response to an article posted in The Emancipator where Francis added a personal statement to the end of an incident summary involving local police claiming, "How long O Justice! How long!" While waiting for a decision on his appeal to the case, Francis made remarks about the case in an editorial in The Emancipator and was summoned once again by Williams and charged of being in contempt of the court. He was sentenced to another thirty days in prison.

=== Deportation of editor Thomas F. H. Morenga-Bonaparte ===
Another incident involving The Emancipator happened in 1922, when Virgin Island native Thomas F. H. Morenga-Bonaparte published an article stating, "It is no gainsaying the fact that something is wrong with our Police Department; of course we cannot rightly use the word force, for we would be wrong in so doing. A police force is made up not only of men with heads and wearing stripes, badges, uniforms, or civilian clothes; but brains in the men's heads coupled with discretion are the main factors of such a responsible body...The holes in the police department should be darned." A Police Commission was held soon after where after a month of questioning the defendant, Captain Henry Hughes Hough signed an order of deportation. When questioned by a local reporter on the legitimacy of a deportation of an island native, Hughes declined to comment.

=== Famous quote ===
In 1925, Francis wrote perhaps, his most famous quote in The Emancipator when he wrote, "Our population is Negro. The officials are white – white Americans. There's the trouble in a nut-shell...We want no form of government which is HALF CIVIL AND HALF NAVAL. We want a purely civil form of American insular government. We want U.S. Citizenship. We will be content with nothing less." Recognizing the racial challenges confronting Virgin Islanders, he maintained the conviction that democratic empowerment held the key to addressing these issues. He persisted in his argument that self-governance for Virgin Islanders would pave the way for equality and tranquility.

== Legacy ==
=== Senate pardon ===
Rothschild Francis was accused of and sentenced for numerous crimes, most of which were a result of him being the enemy of the U.S. Naval Judge George Washington Williams in the Virgin Islands. Francis was sent to jail several times over things ranging from libel to contempt of court to supposed embezzlement. On October 17, 2022, the Senate petitioned United States President Joe Biden to posthumously pardon Francis of the accusations against him. The petition was led by Senator Alma Francis Heyliger. The resolution to petition was approved December 22, 2022, after an amendment forwarded the petition towards the governor of the Virgin Islands instead of the President.

=== Memorials ===
On April 6, 1942, a famous local square in the Virgin Islands where Francis frequently gave his public speeches was renamed in his honor to Rothschild Francis Market Square. In 2013, major archaeological developments were halted due to the importance of Rothschild Francis Market Square. In 1990, a life-size bronze statue of Francis was erected in a local park to commemorate the achievements that Francis for the progress of civil rights in the U.S. Virgin Islands.
