= Milton E. Potter =

American Virgin Islander politician

Milton Potter

Lieutenant Governor-elect of the United States Virgin Islands
- Assuming office January 4, 2027
- Governor: Stacey Plaskett (elect)
- Succeeding: Tregenza Roach

President of the Virgin Islands Legislature
- Incumbent
- Assumed office January 13, 2025
- Preceded by: Novelle E. Francis

Member of the Virgin Islands Legislature from the St. Thomas-St. John district
- Incumbent
- Assumed office January 11, 2021

Personal details
- Born: Tortola, British Virgin Islands
- Party: Democratic
- Relatives: Osbert Potter (brother)
- Education: Florida A&M University (BS, MS)

Milton E. Potter is an American Virgin Islander politician who is the lieutenant governor-elect. A member of the Democratic Party, he has represented the St. Thomas–St. John district in the Legislature of the Virgin Islands since 2021 and has served as president of the Legislature since January 2025. Before entering the Legislature, Potter served as the Virgin Islands government's Director of Personnel during the administration of Governor Kenneth Mapp.

== Early life and education ==
Potter was born in Tortola, British Virgin Islands, and was raised on St. Thomas, where he attended public schools. He earned a bachelor's degree in criminal justice and a master's degree in school psychology from Florida A&M University.

== Professional career ==
Potter began his career as a school psychologist and counselor. He later worked as a project counselor for the University of the Virgin Islands' Upward Bound program. He subsequently moved into human-resources management, serving as human resources director of the Virgin Islands Port Authority, and from January 2015 to January 2019, as director of personnel for the government of the Virgin Islands.

== Political career ==
Potter was first elected to the Legislature in November 2020 and took office in January 2021. During his first term, he chaired the Committee on Rules and Judiciary and the Committee on Ethical Conduct. In the 35th Legislature, he chaired the Committee on Disaster Recovery, Infrastructure and Planning.

After winning a third legislative term in November 2024, Potter was elected president of the 36th Legislature on January 13, 2025.

=== 2026 lieutenant gubernatorial election ===
In 2026, Potter ran for lieutenant governor as the running mate of gubernatorial candidate Stacey Plaskett. The Plaskett–Potter ticket won the Democratic primary on August 1 and the general election on November 3. The certified election return recorded 12,427 votes for the ticket. Potter is scheduled to assume office on January 4, 2027.

Political offices
Preceded by Novelle E. Francis	President of the Virgin Islands Legislature; 2025–present	Incumbent
Preceded by Tregenza Roach	Lieutenant Governor of the Virgin Islands; Taking office 2027	Elect
Party political offices
Preceded by Tregenza Roach	Democratic nominee for Lieutenant Governor of the Virgin Islands; 2026	Most recent
