= Kenneth Gittens =

United States Virgin Islands politician

Kenny Gittens

Vice President of the Legislature of the Virgin Islands
- Incumbent
- Assumed office January 13, 2025
- Preceded by: Marvin A. Blyden

Majority Leader of the Legislature of the Virgin Islands
- In office January 9, 2023 – January 13, 2025
- Preceded by: Marvin A. Blyden
- Succeeded by: Kurt Vialet

President of the Legislature of the Virgin Islands
- In office January 14, 2019 – May 15, 2019
- Preceded by: Myron D. Jackson
- Succeeded by: Novelle E. Francis

Member of the Virgin Islands Legislature from the St. Croix district
- Incumbent
- Assumed office January 14, 2019
- In office January 14, 2013 – January 9, 2017

Personal details
- Born: June 3, 1971 (age 55) Christiansted, U.S. Virgin Islands
- Party: Democratic
- Children: 2
- Education: University of the Virgin Islands (attended); John Jay College of Criminal Justice (attended); Columbia Southern University (BS, MS)

Kenneth L. "Kenny" Gittens is a United States Virgin Islands politician and the current vice president of the Legislature of the Virgin Islands. Gittens has previously served as president and majority leader of the Legislature of the Virgin Islands.

== Biography ==
Gittens graduated from St. Croix Central High School. He joined the Virgin Islands Police Department in November 1990. While working as a police officer, he also attended the University of the Virgin Islands, John Jay College of Criminal Justice, and Columbia Southern University, where he earned an Associate of Science in Police Science and Administration, a Bachelor of Science, and a Master of Science, respectively. In October 2021, Gittens was hospitalized due to blood clots he thought were gas pain. He made a full recovery.

Political offices
Preceded by Myron D. Jackson	President of the Virgin Islands Legislature; 2019	Succeeded by Novelle E. Francis
Legislature of the Virgin Islands
Preceded by Marvin A. Blyden	Majority Leader of the Virgin Islands Legislature; 2023–2025	Succeeded by Kurt Vialet
Preceded by Marvin A. Blyden	Vice President of the Virgin Islands Legislature; 2025–present	Incumbent
