= Javan James Sr. =

United States Virgin Islands politician

Javan E. James Sr.

Member of the Virgin Islands Legislature from the St. Croix District
- In office January 14, 2019 – January 13, 2025

Personal details
- Born: July 7, 1987 (age 39) St. Croix, U.S. Virgin Islands
- Party: Democratic
- Children: 2

Javan E. James Sr. is a United States Virgin Islands politician and senator who served in the Legislature of the Virgin Islands from the St. Croix District, from 2019 to 2025. He is the youngest member to serve in the territory’s legislature since Alvin Williams Jr.

A member of the Democratic Party, James suddenly switched his party affiliation to become an independent following disruptions and a 2019 reorganization motion that caused him to lose key positions within the majority caucus. In April 2022, James announced that he would not seek another term. Less than a month later, he announced he would seek a third term and rejoined the Democratic Party.

On 4 March 2024, James announced he won’t seek reelection to a fourth term but instead focus on his academic pursuits.

== Early life and education ==
Javan E. James was born in St. Croix on July 7, 1987, to Jonathan E. James Sr. and Marilyn V. Martin, who are both from St. Kitts and Nevis. The second child of three children, James attended Pearl B. Larsen Elementary School, Elena Christian Junior High School and St. Croix Educational Complex High School, where he graduated in June 2005. James later joined the military, but his time was cut short due to mental health issues.

== Career ==
Shortly after high school, James joined Hovensa to become a certified Process Operator. Three months later, he graduated from the Basic Operator Training program. James earned his Hovensa Wastewater Treating Plant certification on November 14, 2008.

In August 2012, James was recruited to the U.S. Air Force in New York. While attending, James completed an eight-week program which included training in military discipline and studies, Air Force core values, physical fitness, and basic warfare principle skills. He graduated from basic military training with flying colors at the Lackland Air Force Base in San Antonio, Texas. James later received his technical training at Goodfellow Air Force Base to become a firefighter. Due to certain circumstances and health concerns, he was discharged from the military. In 2014, James relocated to Florida and worked as an Administrative Assistant at Loft Condominium. After being homesick, James decided to return to St. Croix. He have worked as an Administrative Assistant for Senator Novelle Francis in both the 31st and 32nd Legislature.

=== 2018 election ===
In wake of Hurricanes Irma and Maria devastation, James decided to run for the Senate. He received 1,640 votes in the August 4 Democratic primary. On November 6, 2018, James was the youngest candidate elected to the Senate with 5,432 votes while placing fourth.

=== 2020 election ===
James garnered 914 votes in the Democratic primary. He won the general election with 3,735 votes.

=== 2022 election ===
James won reelection with 4,278 votes.

== Personal life ==
Javan James was married to Sherima and they have one child together.
