= Marvin A. Blyden =

United States politician

Marvin Blyden

Vice President of the Virgin Islands Legislature
- In office January 9, 2023 – January 13, 2025
- Preceded by: Novelle Francis
- Succeeded by: Kenny Gittens

Majority Leader of the Virgin Islands Legislature
- In office January 14, 2019 – December 23, 2021
- Preceded by: Neville James
- Succeeded by: Kenny Gittens

Member of the Virgin Islands Legislature from the St. Thomas-St. John district
- Incumbent
- Assumed office January 12, 2015

Personal details
- Born: August 24, 1962 (age 63) St. Thomas, Virgin Islands, U.S.
- Party: Democratic
- Spouse: Jacqueline Blyden

Marvin A. Blyden is a politician and senator of the Legislature of the Virgin Islands, since 2015. On September 25, 2021, he was cited for not following Covid quarantine regulations.

Legislature of the Virgin Islands
Preceded by Neville James	Majority Leader of the Virgin Islands Legislature; 2019–2023	Succeeded by Kenny Gittens
Preceded by Novelle Francis	Vice President of the Virgin Islands Legislature; 2023–2025	Succeeded by Kenny Gittens
