= Donna Frett-Gregory =

American politician

President of the Virgin Islands Legislature
- In office January 11, 2021 – January 9, 2023
- Preceded by: Novelle Francis
- Succeeded by: Novelle Francis

Vice President of the Virgin Islands Legislature
- In office January 14, 2019 – May 15, 2019
- Preceded by: Nereida Rivera-O’Reilly
- Succeeded by: Myron Jackson

Member of the Virgin Islands Legislature from St. Thomas/St. John district
- In office January 14, 2019 – January 13, 2025
- Succeeded by: Avery Lewis

Commissioner of the Virgin Islands Department of Education
- In office January 15, 2014 – January 5, 2015
- Governor: John de Jongh
- Preceded by: LaVerne Terry
- Succeeded by: Sharon McCollum

Personal details
- Born: October 4, 1965 (age 60) St. Thomas, U.S. Virgin Islands
- Party: Democratic
- Children: 4
- Education: Morgan State University (BS); University of the Virgin Islands (MPA); Western Governors University (MBA)
- Website: https://donnarodney2026.com/

Donna Alecia Frett-Gregory (born October 4, 1965) is an American politician who served as a member of the Legislature of the Virgin Islands from the St. Thomas/St. John district from 2019 to 2025. A three term senator, Frett-Gregory served as Vice President and chair of the Finance Committee in the 33rd Legislature. From 2021 to 2023, she served as Senate President during the 34th Legislature, ultimately becoming the third woman in the legislature’s history to do so.

Prior to her entering politics, she served as Chief Financial Officer of the Virgin Islands Port Authority, Commissioner of the Virgin Islands Department of Education, and Director of Operations at the Virgin Islands Department of Justice.

In June 2026, Frett-Gregory announced her candidacy for governor of the United States Virgin Islands at Waterfront Promenade on St. Thomas.

== Early life and education ==
Frett-Gregory was born on the island of St. Thomas to Jacob Augustus Frett and Iris Hobson. She grew up in Hospital Ground (Round De Field) neighborhood of Charlotte Amalie. In 1983, Frett-Gregory graduated from Charlotte Amalie High School and later obtained her MBA from Western Governors University, MPA from the University of the Virgin Islands and a BSBA from Morgan State University. She earned a certificate in senior executive leadership from Harvard University John F. Kennedy School of Government and holds an advanced government finance certification from the Government Finance Officers Association.

== Career ==
Frett-Gregory began her career in the 18th Virgin Islands Legislature, where she served as an accounting clerk in the Business Division before being promoted to budget analyst in the Post Audit Division.

She went on to serve as Chief Financial Officer of the Virgin Islands Port Authority, where she managed the authority's financial operations. She also served as Director of Operations at the Virgin Islands Department of Justice, where her responsibilities included management of the Bureau of Corrections.

Frett-Gregory served on two gubernatorial transition teams: the financial transition team for Governor Charles Turnbull and the property and procurement transition team for Governor Kenneth Mapp.

In 2019, Frett-Gregory founded the DFG Community Impact Foundation (DFG-CIF Inc.), a nonprofit organization providing scholarships and mentorship programs to students and support services to elderly residents and women in the U.S. Virgin Islands. The foundation hosts an annual International Women's Day celebration honoring women across the territory.

== Political career ==
During the 2018 election, Frett-Gregory was among the top women to dominate the race. She emphasized the need for senators to work together and offered solutions to stabilizing the economy and improving the government’s retirement system.

As Senate President, Frett-Gregory collaborated with the Bryan administration and overhauled the Legislature's internal processes, including the development of administrative policies and procedures for institutional operations. She created subcommittees to address long-standing issues, facilitating the passage of legislation including the restoration of the 8% salary reduction for government employees, the merger of fire services and EMS, GERS pension stabilization, and public utility reform. During her tenure, she was elected to serve on the Executive Board of the National Conference of State Legislatures (NCSL) and the NCSL Women's Leadership Network, becoming the first Virgin Islander to hold those positions. Across three terms, Frett-Gregory sponsored and enacted more than 30 pieces of legislation.

In July 2019, Frett-Gregory announced she would return the $1,000 donated to her 2018 campaign back to Jeffrey Epstein-tied Southern Trust Company. While doing so, Frett-Gregory stated that she does not support Epstein misconduct amid his recent allegations and won’t be affiliated with anyone that behaves in that manner.

=== Committees chaired ===
- Education and Workforce Development: January 14, 2019 – January 11, 2021 (inaugural chair, preceding Genevieve Whitaker)
- Committee of the Whole: January 11, 2021 – January 9, 2023 (succeeding Novelle Francis, preceding Novelle Francis)
- Budget, Appropriations and Finance: January 9, 2023 – December 19, 2024 (succeeding Kurt Vialet, preceding Novelle Francis)

=== Decision not to seek re-election ===
In May 2024, Frett-Gregory announced she would not seek re-election to the 36th Legislature, stating the decision came "after careful reflection and discussion with family members, friends, supporters and constituents." She stated her intention to continue public service in a different capacity and to dedicate more time to her DFG Community Impact Foundation.

=== 2026 gubernatorial campaign ===
On April 17, 2026, Frett-Gregory picked up nomination papers from the Elections System of the Virgin Islands to enter the 2026 gubernatorial race as a Democrat. She filed her official candidacy in the St. Thomas/St. John District in May 2026 alongside lieutenant governor running mate Rodney Moorehead, a longtime St. Croix educator who has served as a teacher, assistant principal, and principal across the St. Croix school district.

The Frett-Gregory/Moorehead ticket entered a competitive Democratic primary field that also includes Delegate to Congress Stacey Plaskett and Senate President Milton Potter, as well as former Lieutenant Governor Tregenza Roach and Senator Novelle Francis Jr.

== Personal life ==
Frett-Gregory is divorced and has four children and three grandchildren. In May 2022, Donna tested positive for COVID-19.

Legislature of the Virgin Islands
Preceded by Nereida Rivera-O’Reilly	Vice President of the Virgin Islands Legislature; 2019	Succeeded by Myron Jackson
Political offices
Preceded by Novelle Francis	President of the Virgin Islands Legislature; 2021–2023	Succeeded by Novelle Francis
