= Alma Francis-Heyliger =

United States Virgin Islands politician (born 1973)

Alma Francis Heyliger

Member of the Virgin Islands Legislature from the St. Thomas-St. John district
- Incumbent
- Assumed office January 11, 2021

Personal details
- Born: Alma Francis; October 12, 1973 (age 52) St. Thomas, U.S. Virgin Islands
- Party: Independent
- Spouse: Gilbert "Pugito" Heyliger
- Education: University of the Virgin Islands

Alma Francis Heyliger (born October 12, 1973) is a United States Virgin Islands politician, former radio talk host, and Senator serving in the Legislature of the Virgin Islands from the St. Thomas-St. John District, since 2021.

The owner of Infinity Broadcasting, LLC. In December 2020, Alma took ownership of Radio One AM 1000, becoming one of the few Black women to manage a radio station out of 11,000 radio stations across the country.

== Early life and education ==
Alma Francis Heyliger was born on October 12, 1973, in St. Thomas to the late Leeann Rabsatt Francis from Tortola and Denzil” Frank” Francis Defreitas from St. Kitts. Alma graduated from Charlotte Amalie High School in 1991. She later attended the University of the Virgin Islands where she studied Business communications.

== Career ==
Francis Heyliger has been employed with the Legislature of the Virgin Islands for over 22 years. She has worked for the MIS Division and within the office of Senator Donald Cole from 1999 to 2003 and Senator Lorraine Berry from 2003 to 2005. Prior to being in that capacity, Alma was a contract specialist for Department of Property and Procurement Home Protection Roofing program.

== Political career ==
During her first term, Alma has introduced 14 pieces of legislation which include the CROWN Act which was successfully passed and is now law.

In January 2023, Francis Heyliger pushed back when Democratic members of the 35th Legislature voted down her measure to create a minority caucus.
