= Novelle Francis =

United States Virgin Islands politician

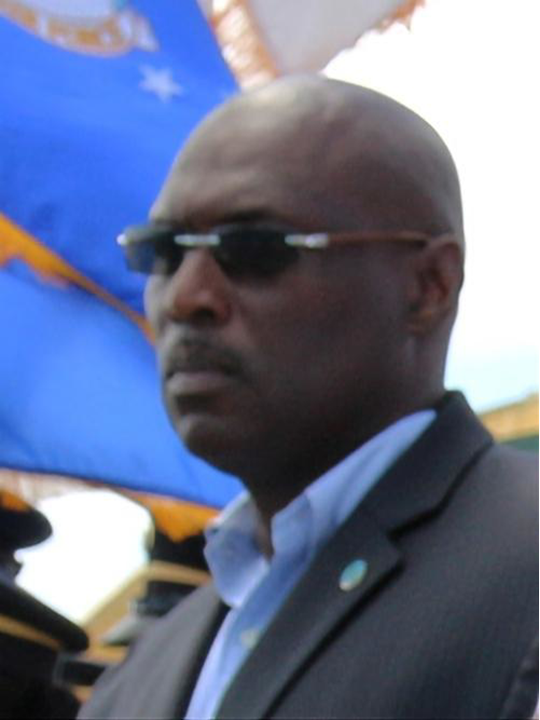
- Francis observing 2018 Memorial Day parade

President of the Virgin Islands Legislature
- In office January 9, 2023 – January 13, 2025
- Preceded by: Donna Frett-Gregory
- Succeeded by: Milton E. Potter
- In office May 15, 2019 – January 11, 2021
- Preceded by: Kenneth Gittens
- Succeeded by: Donna Frett-Gregory

Vice President of the Virgin Islands Legislature
- In office January 11, 2021 – January 9, 2023
- Preceded by: Myron Jackson
- Succeeded by: Marvin Blyden

Member of the Legislature of the Virgin Islands from the St. Croix district
- Incumbent
- Assumed office January 12, 2015

Police Commissioner of the United States Virgin Islands Police Department
- In office May 2009 – August 2011
- Governor: John de Jongh
- Preceded by: James McCall
- Succeeded by: Henry White Jr.

Personal details
- Born: St. Croix, U.S. Virgin Islands
- Party: Democratic
- Spouse: Avril Johnson
- Education: John Jay College

Novelle E. Francis Jr. is a United States Virgin Islands politician, and current senator of the Legislature of the Virgin Islands. Francis served as President of the Legislature twice, from 2019 to 2021 and again from 2023 to 2025. He also served as Vice President of the Legislature of the Virgin Islands from 2021 to 2023. Prior to becoming a Senator, Francis was the Police Commissioner of the United States Virgin Islands Police Department.

Political offices
Preceded by Kenneth Gittens	President of the Virgin Islands Legislature; 2019–2021	Succeeded by Donna Frett-Gregory
Preceded by Donna Frett-Gregory	President of the Virgin Islands Legislature; 2023–2025	Succeeded by Milton E. Potter
Legislature of the Virgin Islands
Preceded by Myron Jackson	Vice President of the Virgin Islands Legislature; 2021–2023	Succeeded by Marvin Blyden
