= Democratic Party of the Virgin Islands =

U.S. Virgin Islands affiliate of the Democratic Party

Democratic Party of the United States Virgin Islands
- Chairperson: Carol Burke
- Governor: Albert Bryan
- Lieutenant Governor: Tregenza Roach
- Legislature President: Milton E. Potter
- U.S. House Delegate: Stacey Plaskett
- Founded: 1936
- Membership: 20,102 (2024)
- Ideology: Modern liberalism
- Political position: Center-left
- National affiliation: Democratic Party
- Colors: Blue
- Legislature of the Virgin Islands: 12 / 15
- U.S. House of Representatives: 1 / 1

Election symbol

Website
- https://democratvi.org/

The Democratic Party of the Virgin Islands is a political party in the U.S. Virgin Islands, and is affiliated with the Democratic Party at the nationwide level. It won the gubernatorial election of 2022 when the incumbent Democratic governor Albert Bryan was elected with 56 percent of the vote. In the last lesiglative election in November 2024, the party won 12 out of 15 seats in the Legislature of the Virgin Islands. Out of 30,000 active registered voters in the U.S. Virgin Islands, approximately 20,000 voters are registered Democrats.

According to political scientist Malik Sekou of the University of the Virgin Islands, the Democratic Party of the Virgin Islands is the strongest party in the U.S. Virgin Islands, with the other significant parties (Independent Citizens Movement and the Republican Party of the Virgin Islands) failing to be competitive in gubernatorial elections for over three decades. Politicians affiliated with the party have dominated the legislature for the last 30 years, served as governors for 25 years out of 33 years from 1987 to 2020, and served as the Delegate to Congress 29 years out of 33 years during the same span.

== History ==
While the Democratic Party of the Virgin Islands was formed after the granting of universal suffrage in 1936, it wasn't until 1952 that the party started officially sponsoring candidates for local elections. After the passage of the Election Code of 1962, the party was officially recognized by the territory, and became formally affiliated with the national Democratic party.

=== Unity takeover ===
After the Revised Organic Act of 1954 allowed the Virgin Islands to elect its own legislature, the party quickly gained a monopoly over legislative power. Since 1954, a separate, unorganized faction of the party called the Unity Party, (also called the Mortar and Pestle Democrats) had existed and won seats in elections, winning a majority in 1962.

In 1963, according to district judge Walter A. Gordon, "the Unity Party, through a fraudulent, collusive and conspiratorial scheme attempted and was successful in taking over the Democratic Party of the Virgin Islands." The Unity Party voted to change their names to the Virgin Islands Unity-Democratic Party, to imply an affiliation with the national Democratic Party, and circulated a petition among its members to register as the Democratic Party of the Virgin Islands, and then voted itself out of existence and started using the name of the Democratic Party.

Unity Party members then successfully gained a majority of seats on the original Democratic Party's territorial committee, and consolidated power by expelling existing Democratic Party members (or Donkey Democrats) and consolidating Unity Party control.

In Alexander V. Todman in 1964, the District Court of the United States Virgin Islands declared the takeover null and void and affirmed the validity of the original leadership of the Democratic Party. 158-1963. (United States District Court, Virgin Islands, D. St. Thomas and St. John. July 17, 1964).

=== Other ideological splinters ===
In 1968, Cyril King and other liberals unhappy with the takeover of Democratic Party formed a third party, the Independent Citizens Movement. It elected King governor in 1974. While most of the party's leaders eventually came back to the Democrats, the ICM still remains an important third party to this day.

== Electoral performance (2010-present) ==
Year	Gubernatorial vote	House vote	Legislative seats
2024	No election held	1st (10,397) 73.39 / 100	12 / 15
2022	1st (12,157) 56.1 / 100	1st (16,354) 98.7 / 100	11 / 15
2020	No election held	1st (15,470) 88.1 / 100	10 / 15
2018	1st (12,677) 55.0 / 100	1st (16,341) 98.4 / 100	13 / 15
2016	No election held	1st (14,531) 97.5 / 100	11 / 15
2014	2nd (8,573) 35.9 / 100	1st (21,224) 90.7 / 100	11 / 15
2012	No election held	1st (11,512) 60.1 / 100	12 / 15
2010	1st (17,535) 56.3 / 100	1st (18,584) 71.2 / 100	10 / 15
