= 2026 United States Virgin Islands general election =

The 2026 United States Virgin Islands general election took place on Tuesday, November 3, 2026, to elect the non-voting delegate to the United States House of Representatives, all 15 seats in the Legislature of the Virgin Islands, members of the Virgin Islands Board of Elections, and members of the Virgin Islands Board of Education. Primary elections were held 3 months earlier on August 1, 2026.

== Gubernatorial election ==
Governor Albert Bryan was re-elected in 2022 with 56.1% of the vote. He will be term limited in 2026 and cannot seek re-election for a third consecutive term.

Current delegate to the United States House of Representatives Stacey Plaskett defeated Lieutenant Governor Tregenza Roach and former senator Donna Frett-Gregory in the primary.

Plaskett faced former Saint Croix police chief and senator Oakland Benta, former Democratic senator Adlah Donastorg Jr., former public works commissioner Gustav James, and hedge fund executive Warren Mosler, who ran as independents in the general election. Plaskett won the general election with 62.8% of the vote.

Governor & Lieutenant Governor
Candidate	Party	Votes	%
Stacey Plaskett & Milton E. Potter	Democratic Party	11,865	62.81
Adlah Donastorg & Positive Nelson	Independent	2,507	13.27
Oakland Benta & Merwin Potter	Independent	2,273	12.03
Warren Mosler & Colin Robertson	Independent	1,293	6.84
Gustav James & Randolph Bennett	Independent	637	3.37
Write-In		316	1.67
Total		18,891	100.00
Total votes		18,891	–

== Delegate to the US House of Representatives ==
Incumbent Democratic delegate Stacey Plaskett, first elected in 2014 with 90.7% of the vote, originally filed paperwork to run for re-election, but instead chose to run for governor of the Virgin Islands in 2026. Janelle Sarauw was elected with 76.89% of the vote.

Delegate to the U.S. House of Representatives - At-Large (1 seat)
Candidate	Party	Votes	%
Janelle K. Sarauw	Democratic Party	13,584	76.89
Shelley A. H. Moorhead	Independent	3,727	21.10
Write-In		355	2.01
Total		17,666	100.00
Total votes		17,666	–

== Legislature of the Virgin Islands ==
Three incumbents are not seeking reelection:

1. St. Thomas-St. John District: Milton E. Potter is retiring to run for Lieutenant Governor.
2. St. Croix District: Novelle E. Francis is retiring to run for Lieutenant Governor.
3. St. Croix District: Marise James is retiring.

Four incumbents lost reelection:

1. At Large District: Angel Bolques Jr. lost reelection to Hadiya Sewer.
2. St. Thomas-St. John District: Ray Fonseca and Dwayne M. DeGraff lost reelection.
3. St. Croix District: Hubert L. Frederick lost reelection.

Senator At Large (1 Seat)
Candidate	Party	Votes	%
Hadiya Sewer	Independent	10,213	60.93
Angel Bolques Jr.	Democratic Party	6,492	38.73
Write-In		56	0.33
Total		16,761	100.00
Total votes		16,761	–

St. Thomas / St. John District (7 seats)
Candidate	Party	Votes	%
Imani Daniel	Independent	4,656	8.75
Alma Francis-Heyliger (incumbent)	Independent	4,650	8.74
Avery Lewis (incumbent)	Democratic Party	4,584	8.62
Marvin Blyden (incumbent)	Democratic Party	4,033	7.58
Rudel Hodge Jr.	Democratic Party	3,963	7.45
Sennai Habtes	Independent	3,746	7.04
Carla J. Joseph (incumbent)	Democratic Party	3,590	6.75
Shenelle Fina Francis	Democratic Party	3,356	6.31
Dwayne M. DeGraff (incumbent)	Independent	3,291	6.19
Vernon Araujo	Independent	2,684	5.05
Ray Fonseca (incumbent)	Democratic Party	2,633	4.95
Joel Browne Connors	Democratic Party	2,379	4.47
Eugene Farrell	Independent	2,051	3.86
Paula Duke	Independent	1,560	2.93
Derrick Callwood	Republican Party	1,516	2.85
Krishna Kilaru	Independent	1,471	2.77
Gregory Smith	Independent	754	1.42
David Sierra	Independent Citizens Movement	733	1.38
Collister Fahie	Republican Party	686	1.29
Eric Tillet	Republican Party	628	1.18
Other / Write-in		228	0.43
Total		53,192	100.00

St. Croix District (7 seats)
Candidate	Party	Votes	%
Kurt Vialet	Democratic Party	6,774	12.26
Kenneth Gittens	Democratic Party	4,610	8.34
Franklin D. Johnson	Independent	4,353	7.88
Clifford A. Joseph	Democratic Party	4,228	7.65
Ophelia "Nemmy" Williams-Jackson	Democratic Party	3,877	7.02
Lisa Charles	Democratic Party	3,866	7.00
Jose "Besse" Gonzalez	Democratic Party	3,825	6.92
Hubert L. Frederick (incumbent)	Democratic Party	3,140	5.68
Nereida Rivera O'Reilly	Independent	3,134	5.67
Samuel Carrion	Independent	2,955	5.35
Bianca Francis	Independent	2,740	4.96
Alvin Milligan	Independent	2,339	4.23
Elizabeth Hansen Watley	Independent	2,029	3.67
Mutasem Mustafa	Independent	936	1.69
Norman Jn Baptiste	Independent	822	1.49
Raymond James	Republican Party	819	1.48
Diane Prosper	Independent	724	1.31
Jay Watson	Independent	723	1.31
Julian Veira	Independent	715	1.29
Troy Mason	Independent	637	1.15
Gage Edmunds	Independent	585	1.06
Troy Williams	Independent	541	0.98
Luz Browne	Independent	488	0.88
Tyler Fay	Independent	274	0.50
Other / Write-in		131	0.24
Total		55,265	100.00

== Board of Education ==
Board of Education - St. Croix District (2 seats)
Candidate	Party	Votes	%
Vincent Gordon Jr.	Independent	3,459	27.41
Lucy Jackson	Independent	3,254	25.78
Terrence Joseph	Democratic Party	3,125	24.76
Winona Hendricks	Democratic Party	2,712	21.49
Other / Write-in		71	0.56
Total		12,621	100.00

Board of Education - St. Thomas/St. John District (2 seats)
Candidate	Party	Votes	%
Judy M. Gomez	Democratic Party	5,191	44.51
Arah C. Lockhart	Democratic Party	4,081	34.99
Bruce C. Flamon	Independent	2,242	19.22
Write-In		149	1.28
Total		11,663	100.00

== Board of Elections ==
Board of Elections - St. Croix District (3 seats)
Candidate	Party	Votes	%
Shamari Haynes	Democratic Party	4,553	28.86
Mary Moorhead	Independent	3,415	21.64
Kareem Francis	Independent	2,905	18.41
Franz Christian Jr.	Republican Party	2,564	16.25
Juliet Liburd	Independent	2,283	14.47
Other / Write-in		58	0.37
Total		15,778	100.00

Board of Elections - St. Thomas / St. John District (2 seats)
Candidate	Party	Votes	%
Barbara A. Petersen	Democratic Party	3,934	36.33
Kevin A. Rodriquez	Democratic Party	3,750	34.63
Harriet A. Mercer	Republican Party	3,021	27.90
Write-In		124	1.15
Total		10,829	100.00

Board of Elections - St. John Seat (1 seat)
Candidate	Party	Votes	%
Raven Phillips	Independent	3,593	61.80
Preston R. Evans	Democratic Party	2,158	37.12
Write-In		63	1.08
Total		5,814	100.00
