= 36th Virgin Islands Legislature =

Virgin Islands legislative session

36th Legislature of the Virgin Islands

Leadership
- President: Milton E. Potter (D)
- Vice President: Kenneth Gittens (D)
- Majority Leader: Kurt Vialet (D)
- Minority Leader: Dwayne M. DeGraff (I)

Structure
- Seats: 15
- Length of term: 2 years

The 36th Virgin Islands Legislature is the current meeting of the Legislature of the Virgin Islands. It convened in Charlotte Amalie on January 13, 2025 and adjourns on December 31, 2026, during the final two years of Albert Bryan’s governorship.

In the 2024 elections, the Democratic Party of the Virgin Islands retained their majority, securing two open seats which were held by Senators Donna Frett-Gregory and Javan James who did not seek another term. The Democratic Party gained one seat from Independent Senator Samuel Carrion of St. Croix, who lost reelection.

== Major events ==
- January 13, 2025, Members-elect of the 36th Legislature are sworn in at Emancipation Gardens on St. Thomas. 12 p.m. EST: The 36th Legislature convenes into session. Milton Potter succeeds Novelle Francis as Senate President.
- January 27, 2025: Governor Bryan delivered his seventh State of the Territory Address.
- January 28, 2025: Swearing-in ceremony for Sixth Constitutional Convention takes place at Earle Ottley Legislative Hall.
- February 3, 2025: Senate President Milton Potter calls for urgent meeting with Governor Bryan to address federal funding freeze.
- April 4, 2025: Senator Ray Foncesa calls for emergency declaration amid hospital shortage of medical staff and supplies.
- April 14, 2025: Senate held special session to discuss hospital crisis in the territory.
- April 15, 2025: Legislature establish Committee on Ethical Conduct to investigate complaint filed against Senator at-large Angel Bolques Jr.
- May 23, 2025: Senators express concern over pay raises for both Governor Bryan and Lt. Governor Roach.
- May 28, 2025: Senior citizens held mock session on Senate floor in recognition of Older Americans Month.
- May 30, 2025: The Committee on Ethical Conduct recommends legislative hearing on misconduct allegations against Senator at-large Angel Bolques Jr.
- June 4, 2025: Senators voted 14-0 to rescind pay raises for the Governor, Lt. Governor and other government officials recommended by the Virgin Islands Public Officials Compensation Commission.
- June 27, 2025: Senators voted 15-0 to override Governor Albert Bryan veto on bill repealing his salary increase.
- July 2, 2025: Senate President Milton Potter criticize Governor Albert Bryan for lack of communication prior to publicly calling for a special session to address his legislative proposals.
- July 24, 2025: Senator at-large Angel Bolques Jr., entered a no contest plea to a charge of violating his oath of office.
- August 1, 2025: Senate voted 13-0 to remove two measures offered by Governor Albert Bryan during a special session.
- August 7, 2025: Senators attend renaming ceremony of the Finance Dept. building in downtown St. Thomas in honor of Former Commissioner Bernice Turnbull.
- August 14, 2025: Senate voted 7-6 to approve a reprimand and 30-day suspension for Senator at-large Angel Bolques Jr., following findings by the Committee on Ethical Conduct related to his sexual harassment allegations.
- August 29, 2025: Senate President Milton Potter lambast Governor Albert Bryan response over Legislature’s decision to deny Summer’s End Marina permit.
- September 4, 2025: Senate President Milton Potter responds to Governor Albert Bryan criticism of the legislative process amid the denial of Summer’s End Marina permit extension.
- September 9, 2025: Senator Marise James announce she would not seek reelection.
- September 24, 2025: Legislature closed out of caution due to inclement weather.
- October 2, 2025: Senator at-large Angel Bolques Jr. calls out Port Authority for increased fees affecting St. John residents.
- October 6, 2025: Delegates of Sixth Constitutional Convention express concerns about limited public engagement as October 31st deadline nears.
- October 9, 2025: Senator Kenneth Gittens file formal complaint against Senator Joseph for her behavior.
- October 12, 2025: Senator Carla Joseph defends her actions following a Rules & Judiciary Committee meeting on October 9.
- October 17, 2025: Legislature consider tapping into Rainy Day Fund to secure benefits for SNAP recipients in the territory amid federal government shutdown.
- October 22, 2025: Senator Ray Fonseca calls for federal takeover or bankruptcy of WAPA to end the public utility’s high debt and inadequate service to the community.
- October 29, 2025: Delegates of Sixth Constitutional Convention request more time and funding to submit constitutional draft.
- October 30, 2025: Senator Carla Joseph clash with Senator Novelle Francis over funding for St. Croix horse racetrack.
- November 25, 2025: Senators attend the remaining ceremony of Superior Court on St. Thomas in honor of Judge Verne A. Hodge.
- December 16, 2025: Senators attend groundbreaking of the new Donna Christian-Christensen, MD Health complex in Christiansted, St. Croix.
- December 18, 2025: Senate President Milton Potter and other members of the 36th Legislature attend the agreement signing of Crown Bay Port redevelopment.
- January 12, 2026: Senators voted 15-0 to raise the minimum wage from $10.50 to $15.00 over a three-year period.
- January 22, 2026: Senators fails to subpoena VI Republican Party chair John Yob.
- January 26, 2026: Governor Bryan delivered his eight and final State of the Territory Address.
- January 30, 2026: Delegates of the Sixth Constitutional Convention completes constitutional draft and forward it to legal counsel for review.
- January 31, 2026: Vechiclar accident ravaged portions of the Legislature’s pump room on St. Thomas.
- February 6, 2026: Legislature host Perma Plaque Ceremony at Earle B. Ottley Legislative Hall on St. Thomas.
- February 9, 2026: Senator at-large Angel Bolques Jr. calls on Bryan administration to extend the V.I. Tax Amnesty Program.
- February 25, 2026: Former Senator Adlah Donastorg Jr. calls for Senate President Milton Potter to publicly investigate after U.S. DOJ released text exchanges between Jeffrey Epstein, Governor Bryan and Delegate Plaskett.
- March 13, 2026: Legislature host Girl Scout Leadership Day.
- March 18, 2026: Senate voted 14-0 to approve Beeston Hill rezoning bill after increasing concerns over lack of housing on St. Croix.
- April 9, 2026: Senators attend groundbreaking of the new Charlotte Amalie High School.
- April 10, 2026: Senator Marise James consider legislative inquiry into Jeffrey Epstein ties with local government agencies.
- April 13, 2026: Legislature suspend operations at Capitol Building on St. Thomas due to inclement weather.
- April 18, 2026: Senate President Milton Potter runs for lieutenant governor, shaking up senatorial race on St. Thomas.
- April 23, 2026: Senate President Milton Potter orders flags flown at half-mast following the passing of former Senator John A. Bell Sr.
- May 6, 2026: Senate Vice President Kenneth Gittens announce the passing of former Senate President Ronald Russell during committee meeting.
- May 12, 2026: Former Senator John A. Bell Sr. lies in state at Legislature Building on St. Croix.
- May 12, 2026: Majority Leader Kurt Vialet declines to 2026 gubernatorial run and insist to remain in the Senate on St. Croix.
- May 26, 2026: Majority Leader Kurt Vialet double down on decision not to run for governor during interview with V.I. Consortium’s Ernice Gilbert.
- May 27, 2026: Senior citizens held mock session at Earl B. Ottley Legislative Hall in recognition of Older Americans Month.
- May 28, 2026: Senate voted to confirm Associate Judge Denise Francois on the Supreme Court of the Virgin Islands and Attorney Renee Andre as Superior Court judge for St. Thomas/St. John district.
- May 30, 2026: Senator Novelle Francis runs for territory’s second top office as aspirants flock St. Croix senatorial race.
- June 1, 2026: Senate Vice President Kenneth Gittens demands for long awaited audit of WAPA after power outages plague St. Thomas & St. John for hours.
- June 9, 2026: Former Senate President Ronald Russell lies in state at Legislature Building on St. Croix.
- June 18, 2026: Power outage affects Capitol building prompting legislative committee meeting to temporary go on recess.
- July 21, 2026: Senate President Milton Potter convenes special session ordered by Governor Bryan for Southland horse racing agreement.
- August 1, 2026: Senate President Milton Potter becomes presumptive Democratic nominee for Lt. Governor following party’s primary election.
- August 4, 2026: Senate voted 11-3 on approving an controversial Water Island lease agreement.
- August 7, 2026: Senators attend ribbon cutting ceremony for new Arthur Richards K-8 school on St. Croix ahead of 2026-27 academic year.
- August 20, 2026: Senator Carla Joseph warns she has legislation to prosecute unspecified members of the Executive Branch amid discovery of OMB utilizing $3,000,000 from the Budget Stabilization Fund without Legislature’s authorization.
- August 25, 2026: Legislature host Perma Plaque Ceremony at Fritz E. Lawaetz Legislative Conference on St. Croix.

== Major legislation ==
=== Enacted ===
- April 28, 2025: Act 8982 (Bill No. 36-0028): An act approving the lease agreement between the Government of the Virgin Islands and Tropical Marine, Inc., for Parcel No. 37-1 Estate Nadir, No. 2 Red Hook Quarter, St. Thomas, Virgin Islands and a portion of unsurveyed Estate Nadir, No. 2. Red Hook Quarter, St. Thomas, Virgin Islands. (introduced by Sen. Milton Potter) Act 8983 (Bill No. 36-0038): An act amending title 29 V.I. Code, chapter 10, subchapter III, section 551, subsection (a) by increasing the limit for outstanding bonds for the Virgin Islands Port Authority from $100 million to $500 million. Act 8984 (Bill No. 36-0040): An act approving the lease agreement between GVI and Charles M. Kim V.I. Foundation, Inc. d/b/a Virgin Islands Museum of Art, for a portion of Lot No. 48b Norre Gade, Kings Quarter, St. Thomas, Virgin Islands. Act 8985 (Bill No. 36-0047): An act amending Act 8920 to appropriate $25,000,000 from the Southern Trust Company Settlement Fund to pay retroactive wages for former and active government employees, and for other purposes.
- June 13, 2025: Act 8987 (Bill No. 36-0021): An act amending title 19 Virgin Islands Code, part III, chapter 29, subchapter I relating to opioids and requiring that a practitioner discuss certain information with a patient when prescribing opioids. Act 8986 (Bill No. 36-0005): An act amending title 16 V.I. Code, chapter 2, section 99 establishing a mandatory minimum bail amount in domestic violence cases. Act 8990 (Bill No. 36-0036): An act repealing and reenacting title 20 V.I. Code, part II, chapter 43, section 512 increasing penalties for traffic violations; establishing a Virgin Islands Police Department Impound Lot; and for other related purposes. Act 8991 (Bill No. 36-0063): An act amending title 33, V.I. Code subtitle 1, chapter 3, sections 41, 42(a), and 43(a) and (c) to clarify that gross receipts taxes must be paid by all contractors doing business in the Virgin Islands regardless of physical location.
- July 9, 2025: Act 8997 (Bill No. 36-0012): An act amending title 3 V.I. Code, chapter 27 to streamline the GERS disability annuity approval procedures and for other related issues. Act 8998 (Bill No. 36-0024): An act amending title 14 V.I. Code, chapter 85 by adding section 1710 declaring a person incapable of consent to sexual relations while the person is in police custody. Act 9000 (Bill No. 36-0035): An act amending title 15 Virgin Islands Code, article V to allow the Government of the Virgin Islands to implement the federal mandate of the Stephen J. Beck, Jr., Achieving Better Life Experiences, which provides for the establishment of savings accounts for persons with disabilities. Act 9001 (Bill No. 36-0043): An act amending title 19 V.I. Code, part VI, chapter 53, subchapter IV, section 1481 by increasing the penalties for violation of sanitation laws. Act 9004 (Bill No. 36-0062): An act approving the lease agreement between the Government of the Virgin Islands, acting through its Commissioner of the Department of Property and Procurement, and the United States Department of Commerce, National Oceanic and Atmospheric Administration for a portion of the telecommunications tower located on Parcel R-22 of Tract 1 Estate Nazareth, No. 1 Red Hook Quarter, St. Thomas. Act 9005 (Bill No. 36-0064): An act amending title 33 V.I. Code, chapter 111, section 3100i to align the disbursement and spending limitations of funds allotted to public schools from the Education Initiative Fund with the realities of academic planning, ensuring that funds are used to maximize student success. Act 9006 (Bill No. 36-0090): An act amending title 1 V.I. Code, chapter 11 by adding section 200m to declare the week beginning the Monday before the first Friday in June as the Virgin Islands Gun Violence Awareness Week.
- August 28, 2025: Act 9010 (Bill No. 36-0130): An act ratifying the Governor’s approval of Major Coastal Zone Permit No. CZMJLW0001-24 issued to Trans America Fiber, U.S., LLC. (introduced by Sen. Milton Potter)
- September 19, 2025: Act 9037 (Bill No. 36-0176): An act providing an appropriation from the General Fund of the Treasury of the Virgin Islands Government to the St. John Capital Improvement Fund for fiscal year October 1, 2025 through September 30, 2026.
- October 1, 2025: Act 9026: An act appropriating $6 million from the Caribbean Basin Initiative Fund as a contribution to the General Fund of the Treasury of the Government of the Virgin Islands in fiscal year October 1, 2025 through September 30, 2026. Act 9042 (Bill No. 36-0181): An act providing an appropriation from the Anti-Litter and Beautification Fund to the VIWMA and the DPW for operating expenses during the fiscal year October 1, 2025 through September 30, 2026.
- October 30, 2025: Act 9047: An Act authorizing $2.77 million from the Budget Stabilization Fund to provide residents with SNAP benefits during federal shutdown.
- November 10, 2025: Act 9060 (Bill No. 36-0201): An act extending deadlines and allocating more funding to the Sixth Constitutional Convention. Act 9053 (Bill No. 36-0121): An act renaming the Peter Carl Limpricht Park as the Ten Sleepless Knights Park in honor of the Ten Sleepless Knights quelbe band and making an appropriation to effectuate that change. Act 9048 (Bill No. 36-0058): An act honoring and commending Dennis “Pumpa" Lennox Leroy Liburd, Jr. for his many contributions to the Virgin Islands culture and music industry as a Soca artist by awarding him the Official key to the Territory and naming the main entrance of 6-Y Peters Rest Road, Christiansted, St. Croix in his honor. Act 9050 (Bill No. 36-0083): An Act establishing a 90-day amnesty period for the waiver of penalties for payment of outstanding property taxes, income taxes, and gross receipt taxes for all tax years to assist taxpayers and businesses recovering from the aftermath of Hurricanes Irma and Maria and Tropical Storm Ernesto. Act 9051 (Bill No. 36-0099): An act amending title 34 V.I. Code, chapter 15 expanding the Elder and Dependent Adult Abuse Prevention Act.
- November 25, 2025: Act 9066 (Bill No. 36-0138): An Act to transfer certain parcels of real property in Subbase to the Virgin Islands Port Authority for the Crown Bay District Redevelopment Project. Act 9067 (Bill No. 36-0148): An Act allowing for taxi drivers to require the use of electronic payments. Act 9064 (Bill No. 36-0086): An Act amending title 3 V.I. Code, chapter 25, section 590b, enacting the Caregivers Leave Act.
- January 23, 2026: Act 9069 (Bill No. 36-0030): An act amending title 24 V.I. Code, chapter 1, section 4, increasing the Virgin Islands minimum wage. Act 9070 (Bill No. 36-0089): An act approving the lease agreement between the Virgin Islands Government and PEO Productions, LLC d/b/a WSTA Radio.
- March 24, 2026: Act 9077 (Bill No. 36-0259): An act amending title 29 V.I. Code, chapter 23, section 1313 by expanding benefits under the Hotel Development Program for hotel improvement and expansion projects on St. Croix.
- March 26, 2026: Act 9078 (Bill No. 36-0084): An Act honoring and commending Alva Alphonse Swan also known as “Coach Tumba" for his significant contributions to the sport of basketball in the Virgin Islands by bestowing upon him the Key to the Territory. Act 9080 (Bill No. 36-0199): An act approving the lease agreement between the GVI, acting through the Commissioner of the Department of Property and Procurement, and Accent Property Management, LLC. for Parcel Nos. 123 and 129 Sub Base, South Side Quarter, St. Thomas, to develop the premises to operate, establish, and manage a slate of subtenants, pursuant to an approved development plan. Act 9085 (Bill No. 36-0220): An act honoring and commending former Senator Lorraine L. Berry posthumously for her decades of outstanding public service by renaming Hull Bay Road on the Northside of St. Thomas, the “Lorraine L. Berry Drive”. Act 9087 (Bill No. 36-0261): An act establishing a 33-business day amnesty to assist taxpayers and businesses recovering from the aftermath of Hurricanes Irma and Maria and Tropical Storm Ernesto by waiving penalties and interest imposed for the non-payment of taxes. Act 9083 (Bill No. 36-0209): An act amending title 23 V.I. Code, chapter 10 to establish civil penalties for disregarding marine advisories and to create the Territorial Marine Safety Fund. Act 9082 (Bill No. 0204): An act approving a multi-year lease agreement between the GVI, acting through its Commissioner of the Department of Property and Procurement, and Commercial Investments LLC, for Parcel No. 30 Submarine Base, No. 6 Southside Quarter, St. Thomas, Virgin Islands, for a logistics storage warehouse and other related purposes. Act 9084 (Bill No. 0219): An act amending title 22 V.I. Code, chapter 31 relating to the Virgin Islands Producer and Adjuster Licensing Act by modifying renewal provisions for insurance producer licenses. Act 9086 (Bill No. 36-0235): An act ratifying the Governor’s approval of Major Coastal Zone Permit No. CZT-09-22(W) granted to Anquet, Inc. Act 9089 (Bill No. 0269): An act granting a zoning use variance to Plot Nos. 24B and 24D, Estate Body Slob, King Quarter, St. Croix to allow for a bus and passenger terminal.
- June 2, 2026: Act 9091 (Bill No. 36-0292): An act appropriating $2,100,000 to the Virgin Islands Water and Power Authority for the repair or replacement of the submarine electrical transmission cables that provides electricity to St. John, and for other related purposes.
- June 9, 2026: Act 9102 (Bill No. 36-0248): An act amending title 29 Virgin Islands Code by enacting the Commercial Property Assessed Clean Energy Act. Act 9103 (Bill No.36-0257): An act transferring the eastern portion of Parcel No. 2C Estate Ross, 8 New Quarter, St. Thomas, from the Virgin Islands Housing Finance Authority to the Virgin Islands Department of Education for use by the Charlotte Amalie High School. Act 9105 (Bill No. 36-0133): An act amending title 17 V.I. Code, chapter 10, section 111(a)(I) providing mental health education and instruction. Act 9097 (Bill No. 36-0181): An act honoring and commending Detective Delberth Phipps, Jr., for his service with the Virgin Islands Police Department and to the Virgin Islands community. ; Act 9094 (Bill No. 36-0114): An act honoring and commending Dilsa Capdeville for her many contributions to the Virgin Islands community through her roles in various areas of social services and advocacy for abused women and children and to rename the Bolongo Bay Head Start Facility the “Dilsa Capdeville Head Start Facility” in her honor. Act 9099 (Bill No. 36-0232): An act amending Act 8018 to authorize the disposal of green waste using controlled incineration technologies, including air curtain incinerators, and for other purposes. Act 9096 (Bill No. 36-0149): A resolution honoring and commending Janeisha John for her outstanding achievements, pioneering spirit, and significant contributions to the fields of entertainment, modeling, and television production, celebrating her role as a cultural ambassador, trailblazer, and inspirational leader of the Virgin Islands. Act 9112 (Bill No. 36-0294): An act appropriating $400,000 from the General Fund of the Treasury of the Virgin Islands to the Election System of the Virgin Islands. Act 9107 (Bill No. 36-0275): An act approving the amended lease agreement between the GVI, acting through the Commissioner of the Department of Property and Procurement, and Hearts In Service Association, Inc., for the leasing of Parcel No. l 75C Estate Anna's Retreat No. 1 New Quarter, St. Thomas for the purpose of providing eligible programs and services to homeless families, individuals, veterans, and at-risk youth and the operation of a soup kitchen and other related purposes.
- June 24, 2026: Second Amendment Rights and Public Safety Act, Act 9114 (Bill No. 36-0309): An act appropriating the sum of $383,784 from the Virgin Islands Education Initiative Fund to the Department of Education to conduct extended school year evaluations to determine students’ eligibility for special education services. (introduced by Sen. Kurt Vialet) Act 9116 (Bill No. 36-0312): An act amending Act No. 9022 regarding compensation for unused leave for legislative employees upon separation.
- August 7, 2026: Act 9117 (Bill No. 36-0332): An act creating a temporary law enforcement integration initiative to increase police manpower, enhance public safety operations, and reduce violent crime throughout the Virgin Islands. Act 9118 (Bill No. 36-0340): An act approving the Reinstatement and Amendment to Lease Agreement between Government of the Virgin Islands, acting through the Commissioner of Property and Procurement and, Water Island Development Company, LLC to develop the Water Island Hotel and Marina. Act 9119 (Bill No. 36-0343): An act appropriating $2,917,519 to the University of the Virgin Islands for general operating expenses.
- September 30, 2026: Act 9129 (Bill No. 36-0389): An act ratifying the First Renewal of Group Life and Accidental Death and Dismemberment Insurance; First Renewal of Group Vision Insurance; Third Renewal of Group Medical Health Insurance, and the Second Renewal of Voluntary (Employee-Paid) Critical Illness Insurance, Voluntary (Employee-Paid) Accidental Injury Insurance, and Voluntary (Employee-Paid) Hospital Care Insurance.

=== Proposed (but not enacted) ===
- Bill No. 36-0003: An Act amending Title 19 V.I. Code relating to nursing homes and assisted living facilities by adding a new chapter 76 to establish the services that nursing homes and assisted living facilities are required to provide; establishing limitations on financial charges, requirements for visitation, and the rights of a resident.
- Bill No. 36-0006: An Act appropriating $600,000 to the Department of Agriculture to be used to fund farmers in the Virgin Islands that produce crops and other food products; and for other related purposes.
- Bill No. 36-0008: An Act amending title 33 V.I. Code, subtitle 2, chapter 89, subchapter I, section 2494 requiring the Lieutenant Governor to offset a property owner’s property tax liability against any amount of money that the government owes to the property owner. (held in Committee on Budget, Appropriations and Finance)
- Bill No. 36-0009: A resolution honoring and commending Mr. Steven van Beverhoudt for his years of dedicated service and numerous contributions to the people of the Virgin Islands.
- Bill No. 36-0014: An Act amending title 20 V.I. Code, part II, chapter 43, subchapter I to establish parking for expectant mothers or mothers with newborns.
- Bill No. 36-0018: An Act amending title 3 V.I. Code, chapter 25, subchapter V, section 551 by increasing the minimum salary amount for teachers from $3,200 per annum to $60,000 per annum and by making technical amendments.
- Bill No. 36-0019: An Act restricting businesses from imposing a surcharge on the credit card of customers. (held in Committee on Economic Development & Agriculture)
- Bill No. 36-0020: An Act amending title 2 V.I. Code, chapter 1, section 6 allowing the Police Chief of the Legislature; the Sergeant-of-Arms; or any security officer of the Legislature; who has peace officer status, to arrest a person who neglects or refuses to appear before the Legislature in obedience to subpoena. (held in Committee on Homeland Security, Justice & Public Safety)
- Bill No. 36-0026: An Act to establish the “Virgin Islands Meteorological Office” within VITEMA. (held in Committee on Government Operations, Veterans Affairs & Consumer Protection)
- Bill No. 36-0037: An Act amending title 4 V.I. Code by establishing a Probate Division in the Superior Court of the Virgin Islands.
- Bill No. 36-0049: An Act establishing the Bureau of School Security within the Virgin Islands Department of Education. (held in Committee on Education & Workforce Development)
- Bill No. 36-0055: An Act honoring and commending Mark Sabino for his outstanding service and commitment to the Virgin Islands people by renaming the West Indian Company Dock in St. Thomas “The Mark Sabino Marine Cruise Facility”.
- Bill No. 36-0067: An Act amending title 17 V.I. Code, chapter 5 by adding a section 41j requiring the Pledge of Allegiance and the Virgin Islands Motto to be recited at the beginning of each school day in public schools, but additionally provides that students may opt out of the recitatation. (held in Committee on Education & Workforce Development)
- Bill No. 36-0068: An Act appropriating $5 million from the General Fund of the GVI Treasury to the Virgin Islands Police Department for the purchase and installation of rapid-shutter motion cameras throughout the community.
- Bill No. 36-0069: An Act amending title 17 V.I. Code, chapter 9, subchapter 1, section 82, subsection(a) by changing the age a child begins kindergarten from five years of age to four years of age. (held in Committee on Education & Workforce Development)
- Bill No. 36-0071: An Act amending title 18 V.I. Code, section 232 to provide the process for political parties to choose their nominees for public offices. (held in Committee on Government Operations, Veterans Affairs and Consumer Protection)
- Bill No. 36-0072: An Act appropriating $405,000 from the General Fund of the Treasury of the Virgin Islands to the Virgin Islands Fire and Emergency Medical Services for the purchase of three ambulances.
- Bill No. 36-0073: An Act amending title 18 V.I. Code, chapter 1, section 4 and title 18 V.I. Code, chapter 3, section 41 relating to the powers of the Supervisor of Elections and the Board of Elections. (held in Committee on Government Operations, Veterans Affairs and Consumer Protection)
- Bill No. 36-0074: An Act amending title 20 V.I. Code, part I by adding a chapter 3 establishing the “Virgin Islands Roadside Property Maintenance and Vegetation Act” to require property owners to maintain roadside vegetation, prevent obstruction of public roads and utility lines, provide for enforcement, penalties, and exceptions, and for other related purposes.
- Bill No. 36-0080: An Act amending title 17 V.I. Code, chapter 5 mandating a daily morning exercise routine for students in all public schools across the Virgin Islands.
- Bill No. 36-0087: An Act amending title 7 V.I. Code by adding chapter 16 to require the Virgin Islands Department of Agriculture to establish and manage a 30-acre orchard on St. Croix.
- Bill No. 36-0109: An Act amending title 33 V.I. Code, chapter 111 to establish the Inspection and Safety on Public Highways Fund; amending title 20 Virgin Islands.
- Bill No. 36-0187: An Act amending title 18 V.I. Code, chapter 23, section 622 requiring the Board of Elections to count by hand votes deposited in a ballot box. (held in Committee on Government Operations, Veterans Affairs and Consumer Protection)
- Bill No. 36-0213: An Act renaming Belvedere Road on the island of St. Croix as “Alicia “Chucky” Hansen Road” and appropriating $10,000 from the St. Croix Capital Improvement Fund to the Virgin Islands Department of Public Works to erect the proper signage.
- Bill No. 36-0231: An Act amending title 5 V.I. Code, subtitle 3, part III, chapter 401, by adding section 4507a to establish procedures for inmate transfers outside the Virgin Islands.

== Vetoed ==
- Bill No. 36-0053 (now Act 8995): An Act amending title 3 V.I. Code, chapter 25, subchapter V, section 555b to increase the minimum annual salary for full time employees of the Government of the Virgin Islands, its semi-autonomous agencies and independent instrumentalities from $27,040 to $35,000. (governor’s veto overridden on June 27, 2025)
- Bill No. 36-0085 (now Act 8996): An Act to prevent or rescind any automatic implementation of salary adjustments made pursuant to the recommendations of the Virgin Islands Public Officials Compensation Commission, to reclaim unauthorized payments, and to establish enforcement and penalty provisions. (governor’s veto overridden on June 27, 2025)
- Bill No. 36-0227: Jah’niqua’s Law (governor’s veto overridden on September 18, 2025)
- November 10, 2025: Bill No. 36-0119: An Act amending Act No. 8651 by reprogramming the appropriated funds to the Department of Sports, Parks, and Recreation to fund the completion of the Randall “Doc” James Racetrack on St. Croix.

== Major resolutions ==
- Res 1914: A resolution organizing and establishing the Majority Caucus, electing the officers, and appointing the chairpersons, vice-chairpersons, and members of the standing committees of the 36th Legislature of the Virgin Islands.
- Res 1915: A resolution adopting the Rules of the 36th Legislature of the Virgin Islands.
- Res 1916 (Bill No. 36-0007): A resolution honoring and commending James Sasso for distinguished service in the mortuary and funeral service industry.
- Res 1917 (Bill No. 36-0029): A resolution honoring and commending Sonya Hough, the creator of the St. Croix “Crucian” Hook Bracelet and proprietor of one of the first hand-wrought jewelry stores in St. Croix.
- Res 1918 (Bill No. 36-0097): A resolution commending the National Conference of State Legislatures (“NCSL”) on its 50th anniversary and recognizing the NCSL for its commitment to the legislative institution.
- Res 1923 (Bill No. 36-0075): A resolution honoring and commending Austin A. Venzen posthumously for his unwavering commitment to music education and the arts, through his work in the classrooms, conducting private music lessons, on the concert stages, and by bringing Virgin Islanders together in choirs, bands, and community events, to foster camaraderie, collaboration, and cultural enrichment.
- Res 1924 (Bill No. 36-0208): A resolution recognizing United States Senator Mike Crapo for his instrumental role in securing the historic increase in the rum cover over tax reimbursement for the Virgin Islands.
- Res 1927 (Bill No. 36-0297): A resolution recognizing and highlighting the friendship and bilateral economic and cultural ties between the USVI and Taiwan.

== Zonings ==
- Act 8988: An act amending Official Zoning Map No. STZ-9 for the island of St. Thomas to rezone Remainder Parcel No. 19-1-2, Parcel No. 19-1-2-7 (Eastern portion), and Parcel No. 19-1-2-7 (Western portion), Estate Smith Bay, Nos. 1, 2, and 3 East End Quarter, St. Thomas, Virgin Islands from A-2 (Agricultural Zone) to B-3 (Business Scattered)
- Act 8989: An act to amend Official Zoning Map No. STZ-9 to allow for the rezoning of Parcel No. 19-1-2-4 Estate Smith Bay, Nos. 1, 2, and 3 East End Quarter, St. Thomas, Virgin Islands, from R-1 (Residential-Low Density) to B-3 (Business-Scattered) and to allow for a use variance from the B-3 (Business-Scattered) zoning designation.
- Act 8994: An act amending Official Zoning Map No. STZ-6, St. Thomas to establish a Planned Area Development on the R-2 zoned Parcel Nos. 4i Remainder and 4J Remainder Estate St. Joseph and Rosendahl, No. 4 Great Northside Quarter.
- Act 9009: An act amending Official Zoning Map No. SCZ-20 for the island of St. Croix to rezone Plot Nos. 36 and 37 Estate Richmond, St. Croix from C (Commercial) to B-3 (Business-Scattered)
- Act 9081: An act amending Official Zoning Map No. SCZ-7 for the island of St. Croix, Virgin Islands, rezoning a portion of the Remainder of Estate Beeston Hill (South Portion), Matricular No. 6a, Company Quarter, St. Croix, from R-l (Residential-Low Density) to B-2 (Business-Secondary/Neighborhood)
- Act 9088: An act amending Official Zoning Map No. STZ-9 rezoning Parcel No.19-2-111 Estate Smith Bay, Nos. 1, 2, and 3 East End Quarter, St. Thomas, consisting of 0.344 acres as described on survey Drawing No. D9-5267-T92 from A-1(Agricultural Zone) to R-3 (Residential-Medium Density)
- Act 9090 (Bill No. 36-0271): An act amending Official Zoning Map No. SCZ-20 for the island of St. Croix rezoning Plot Nos. 31- B, 32-B, 34-CA, 34-CAA, and 34-CB Strand Street, Christiansted, from R-3 (Residential-Medium Density) to B-1 (Business-Secondary/Neighborhood)

== Leadership ==
- Senate President: Milton E. Potter (D)
- Vice President: Kenneth Gittens (D)
- Majority Leader: Kurt Vialet (D)
- Secretary: Avery Lewis (D)

== Members ==
District	Name	Party	Took office
At-large	Angel Bolques Jr.	Democratic	2022
St. Croix	Franklin D. Johnson	Independent	2021
St. Croix	Hubert L. Frederick	Democratic	2025
St. Croix	Clifford A. Joseph, Sr.	Democratic	2025
St. Croix	Kenneth Gittens	Democratic	2019
St. Croix	Marise James	Democratic	2023
St. Croix	Novelle Francis	Democratic	2015
St. Croix	Kurt Vialet	Democratic	2025
St. Thomas/ St. John	Alma Francis-Heyliger	Independent	2021
St. Thomas/ St. John	Carla J. Joseph	Democratic	2021
St. Thomas/ St. John	Avery L. Lewis	Democratic	2025
St. Thomas/ St. John	Dwayne M. DeGraff	Independent	2017
St. Thomas/ St. John	Ray Fonseca	Democratic	2023
St. Thomas/ St. John	Marvin Blyden	Democratic	2015
St. Thomas/ St. John	Milton E. Potter	Democratic	2021

== Committees ==
Committee	Chair	Vice Chair
Committee of the Whole	Milton E. Potter	Kenneth Gittens
Economic Development and Agriculture	Hubert L. Frederick	Angel Bolques Jr.
Budget, Appropriations and Finance	Novelle Francis	Marvin Blyden
Education and Workforce Development	Kurt Vialet	Avery L. Lewis
Health, Hospitals and Human Services	Ray Fonseca	Hubert L. Frederick
Government Operations, Veteran Affairs and Consumer Protection	Avery L. Lewis	Novelle Francis
Homeland Security, Justice and Public Safety	Clifford A. Joseph, Sr.	Ray Fonseca
Housing, Transportation and Telecommunications	Marvin Blyden	Clifford A. Joseph, Sr.
Culture, Youth, Aging, Sports, and Parks	Angel Bolques Jr.	Carla J. Joseph
Rules and Judiciary	Carla J. Joseph	Kenneth Gittens
Disaster Recovery, Infrastructure and Planning	Marise James	Milton E. Potter
