= 2024 United States Virgin Islands general election =

The 2024 United States Virgin Islands general election took place on Tuesday, November 5, 2024, to elect the non-voting delegate to the United States House of Representatives, all 15 seats in the Legislature of the Virgin Islands, members of the Virgin Islands Board of Elections, Board of Education, and the 15 delegates to the Sixth Constitutional Convention.

Primary elections was held on August 3, 2024. In May 2024, the Democratic Party of the Virgin Islands challenged the Supervisor of Elections Caroline Fawkes after she concluded that her office may be restricted from funding and conducting party primaries following a January 2024 ruling by District Court of the Virgin Islands.

== Legislature of the Virgin Islands ==
2024 United States Virgin Islands legislative election
- November 5, 2024

All 15 seats in the Legislature of the Virgin Islands
- Turnout: 51.18%
	Majority party	Minority party
Leader	Milton E. Potter	Dwayne M. DeGraff
Party	Democratic	Independent
Leader's seat	St. Thomas/St. John district	St. Thomas/St. John district
Seats before	11	4
Seats after	12	3
Seat change	1 ▲	1 ▼
Senate President before election
Novelle Francis
Democratic
Elected Senate President
Milton E. Potter
Democratic

Two incumbents did not seek reelection.

1. St. Thomas-St. John District: Donna Frett-Gregory is retiring.
2. St. Croix District: Javan James Sr. is retiring.

Incumbent Democrat Angel Bolques Jr. sought re-election as Senator-At-Large. He faced independent candidate Lorelei Monsanto, the daughter of the late Wilma Marsh Monsanto in the general election. Bolques won 63% of the vote for a third term in office.

Senator At Large
Candidate	Party	Votes	%
Angel Bolques Jr.	Democratic Party	7,543	63.25
Lorelei Marsh Monsanto	Independent	4,230	35.47
Write-In		153	1.28
Total		11,926	100.00
Total votes		15,952	–
Registered voters/turnout		31,171	51.18

All incumbents in St. Thomas/St. John were reelected. Former St. Thomas Administrator Avery Lewis won a seat in the Senate.

St. Thomas/St. John
Candidate	Party	Votes	%
Milton E. Potter (incumbent)	Democratic Party	4,143	12.08
Alma Francis-Heyliger (incumbent)	Independent	4,032	11.76
Dwayne M. DeGraff (incumbent)	Independent	3,764	10.98
Marvin A. Blyden (incumbent)	Democratic Party	3,564	10.40
Carla J. Joseph (incumbent)	Democratic Party	3,483	10.16
Avery Lewis	Democratic Party	3,470	10.12
Ray Fonseca (incumbent)	Democratic Party	2,372	6.92
Shenelle Fina Francis	Democratic Party	2,155	6.29
Eugene D. Farrell	Independent	1,798	5.24
Michael A. Smith	Democratic Party	1,243	3.63
Derrick A. Callwood	Republican Party	1,238	3.61
Margaret Price	Independent Citizens Movement	943	2.75
Krishna Kilaru MD	Independent	894	2.61
Collister Fahie	Republican Party	723	2.11
Write-In		462	1.35
Total		34,284	100.00

In the Democratic primary on St. Croix, former four-term Senator Kurt Vialet topped first place while former VI Fire Service Director Clifford Joseph came in second place. All incumbent Democratic Senators who ran for re-election proceeded to the general election.

St. Croix
Candidate	Party	Votes	%
Kurt Vialet	Democratic Party	1,302	13.55
Clifford A. Joseph	Democratic Party	1,064	11.07
Novelle Francis (incumbent)	Democratic Party	977	10.17
Kenneth Gittens (incumbent)	Democratic Party	976	10.16
Hubert L. Frederick	Democratic Party	867	9.02
Diane T. Capehart (incumbent)	Democratic Party	862	8.97
Marise James (incumbent)	Democratic Party	796	8.28
Nereida “Nellie” O’Reilly	Democratic Party	716	7.45
Attorney Russell Pate	Democratic Party	673	7.00
Genevieve Whitaker	Democratic Party	564	5.87
Michael “Mikey” Springer Jr.	Democratic Party	551	5.73
Justin Curtis Smith	Democratic Party	197	2.05
Write-In		66	0.69
Total		9,611	100.00

In the general election, Former senator Kurt Vialet regained his seat while newcomers Clifford Joseph and Hubert Frederick were among the top vote-getters. Incumbent Senators Diane Capehart and Samuel Carrion lost re-election.

St. Croix
Candidate	Party	Votes	%
Kurt Vialet	Democratic Party	5,035	11.62
Clifford A. Joseph	Democratic Party	3,917	9.04
Novelle Francis (incumbent)	Democratic Party	3,541	8.18
Kenneth Gittens (incumbent)	Democratic Party	3,492	8.06
Franklin D. Johnson (incumbent)	Independent	3,404	7.86
Hubert L. Frederick	Democratic Party	3,297	7.61
Marise James (incumbent)	Democratic Party	3,207	7.40
Diane T. Capehart (incumbent)	Democratic Party	2,967	6.85
Samuel Carrion (incumbent)	Independent	2,866	6.62
Oakland Benta	Independent	2,251	5.20
Jelani L. Ritter	Independent	1,895	4.38
Lisa J. Charles	Independent	1,589	3.67
Julian S. Veira	Independent	1,060	2.45
Tammy M. Smith	Independent	971	2.24
Norman JnBaptiste	Independent	777	1.79
Diane Prosper	Independent	603	1.39
Troy C. Williams	Independent	486	1.12
Moonark Wakefield	Independent	423	0.98
Krystal Hardy	Republican Party	292	0.67
Eric M. Gautreau II	Independent	190	0.44
Write-In		1,049	2.42
Total		43,312	100.00

== Delegate to the United States House of Representatives ==
2024 United States House of Representatives election in the United States Virgin Islands' at-large district
- November 5, 2024
- Turnout: 49.21%
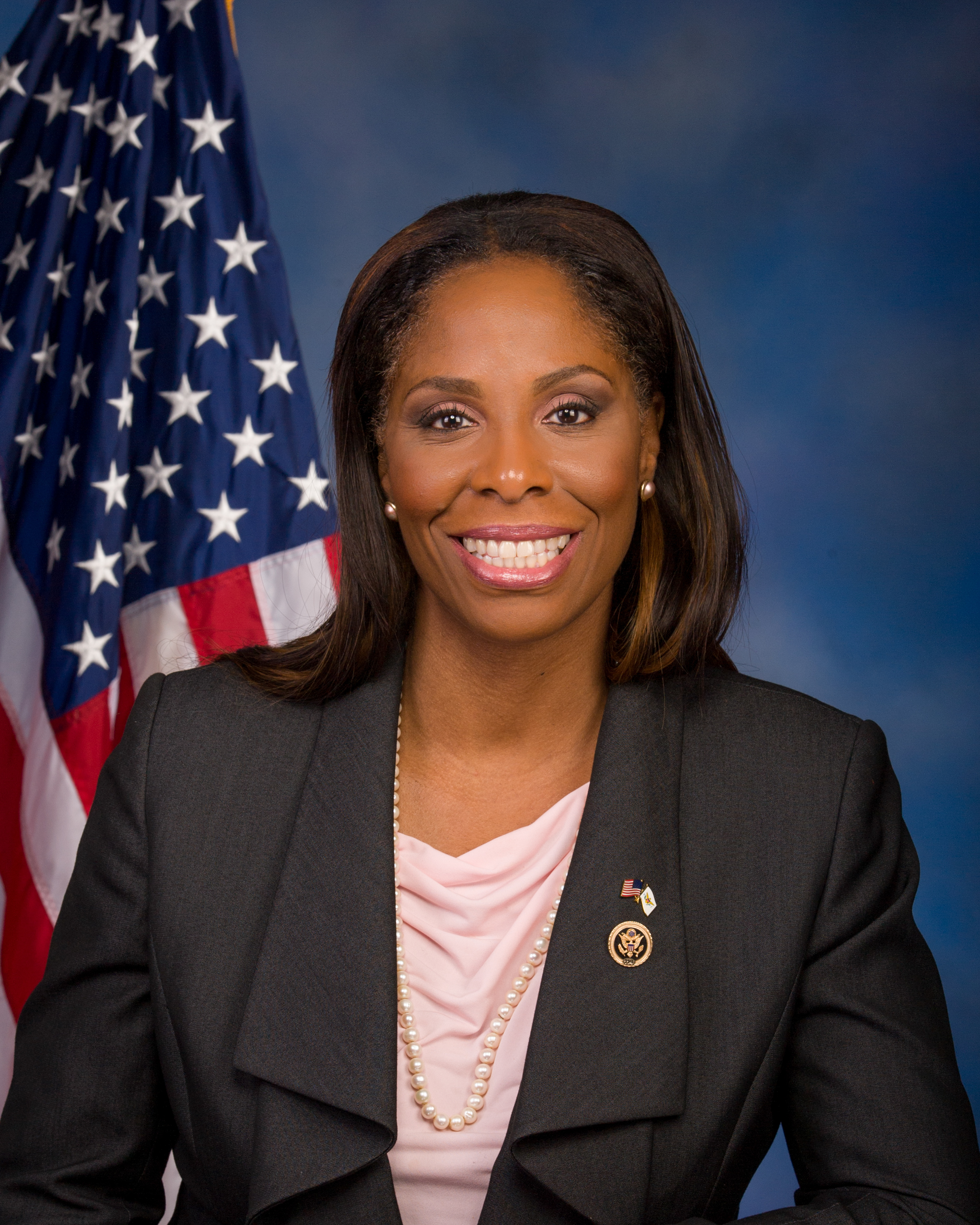

Candidate	Stacey Plaskett	Ida Smith	Ronald Pickard
Party	Democratic	Independent	Republican
Popular vote	10,397	2,323	1,348
Percentage	73.39%	16.4%	9.52%
Delegate at-large before election
Stacey Plaskett
Democratic
Elected Delegate at-large
Stacey Plaskett
Democratic

The 2024 United States House of Representatives election in the United States Virgin Islands was held on November 5, 2024, to elect a non-voting Delegate to the United States House of Representatives from the United States Virgin Islands' at-large congressional district. The election coincided with the larger 2024 United States House of Representatives elections and the legislative election in the United States Virgin Islands.

The U.S. Virgin Islands' non-voting delegate is elected for a two-year term in office. Incumbent delegate Stacey Plaskett, a Democrat who was first elected in 2014, and most recently re-elected with 98.7% of the vote in 2022, ran for a sixth term. Plaskett's challenger, Ronald Pickard, is the first Republican to run for this seat since 2014. She won 73% of the vote defeating her opponents.

=== Polling ===
Poll source	Date(s) administered	Sample size (Note: Key: A – all adults RV – registered voters LV – likely voters V – unclear)	Margin of error	Stacey Plaskett (D)	Ronald Pickard (R)	None of the above	Undecided
Pasquines	October 21 – November 1, 2024	(A)		71.6%	6.7%	11.7%	10%

=== Results ===
Candidate	Party	Votes	%
Stacey Plaskett	Democratic Party	10,397	73.39
Ida Smith	Independent	2,323	16.40
Ronald Pickard	Republican Party	1,348	9.52
Write-In		99	0.70
Total		14,167	100.00
Total votes		15,952	–
Registered voters/turnout		31,171	51.18

== Board of Education ==
St. Thomas/St. John
Candidate	Party	Votes	%
Kyza Callwood, PhD	Democratic Party	320	43.66
Nandi Sekou, Esq.	Democratic Party	300	40.93
Bruce C. Flamon	Democratic Party	108	14.73
Write-In		5	0.68
Total		733	100.00

St. Thomas/St. John
Candidate	Party	Votes	%
Kyza Callwood, PhD	Democratic Party	3,576	44.90
Nandi Sekou, Esq.	Democratic Party	3,155	39.62
Sophia del Rosario	Republican Party	1,157	14.53
Write-In		76	0.95
Total		7,964	100.00

St. Croix
Candidate	Party	Votes	%
Mary “Peggy” Moorhead	Independent	3,013	38.88
Emmanuella Perez-Cassius (incumbent)	Democratic Party	2,790	36.00
Terrell Alexandre	Democratic Party	1,891	24.40
Write-In		55	0.71
Total		7,749	100.00

== Board of Elections ==
St. Croix
Candidate	Party	Votes	%
Cornelius JnBaptiste	Democratic Party	448	38.45
Simone James	Democratic Party	372	31.93
Anthony Mardenborough Jr.	Democratic Party	333	28.58
Write-In		12	1.03
Total		1,165	100.00

St. Croix
Candidate	Party	Votes	%
Lilliana Belardo De O’Neal	Republican Party	2,923	24.29
Simone James	Democratic Party	2,133	17.73
Michael Joseph	Republican Party	2,063	17.14
Cleopatra Peter	Republican Party	1,793	14.90
Franz A. Christian	Republican Party	1,697	14.10
Epiphane “Joe” Joseph	Republican Party	1,319	10.96
Write-In		105	0.87
Total		12,033	100.00

St. Thomas/St. John
Candidate	Party	Votes	%
Lawrence Boschulte	Democratic Party	242	33.11
Chaneel M. Callwood	Democratic Party	207	28.32
Angeli Leerdam (Incumbent)	Democratic Party	200	27.36
Ida Mae F. Brown	Democratic Party	75	10.26
Write-In		7	0.96
Total		731	100.00

St. Thomas/St. John
Candidate	Party	Votes	%
Lawrence Boschulte	Democratic Party	3,066	38.07
Chaneel M. Callwood	Democratic Party	2,838	35.24
Barbara LaRonde	Republican Party	2,028	25.18
Write-In		121	1.50
Total		8,053	100.00

== Constitutional Convention ==
A 2020 referendum was approved by voters calling for the Legislature to enact legislation to convene a constitutional convention. A bill on the calling of the sixth constitutional convention was approved on 29 December 2022. Currently, Guam and the U.S. Virgin Islands are the only United States territories without a constitution.

At Large
Candidate	Votes	%
Alecia M. Wells	4,977	64.59
Hadiya Sewer	2,512	32.60
Write-in	216	2.80
Total	7,705	100.00
Total votes	15,952	–
Registered voters/turnout	31,171	51.18

St. Thomas/St. John
Candidate	Votes	%
Stedmann Hodge Jr.	3,562	34.04
Arturo Watlington Jr.	2,874	27.47
Rudel A. Hodge Jr.	1,844	17.62
David Silverman	1,504	14.37
Lydia Hendricks (write-in)	91	0.87
Imani Daniel (write-in)	80	0.76
Akima Richardson (write-in)	31	0.30
Other write-ins	478	4.57
Total	10,464	100.00

St. Croix
Candidate	Votes	%
Usie Raymond Richards	3,102	12.25
Devin F. Carrington	2,526	9.97
Liliana Belardo-Oneal	2,426	9.58
John J. Abramson Jr.	2,421	9.56
Rupert W. Ross Jr.	2,273	8.97
Ronald Russell	2,154	8.50
John M. Canegata	1,813	7.16
Michael J Springer Jr.	1,633	6.45
Dianna P. Osborne	1,516	5.99
Patricia Welcome	1,474	5.82
Raymond T. James	1,381	5.45
Maria R. Nieves	1,307	5.16
Johann A. Clendenin	584	2.31
Sheila A. Scullion	565	2.23
Write-in	154	0.61
Total	25,329	100.00

== Exit Poll ==
Questionnaire
What are the top issues that are important to you in the 2024 USVI General Election?
Cost of Electricity/Reliability: 80.95%, Government Accountability/Transparency & Efficiency: 61.90%, Economy (Jobs, Environment for Doing Business, Need More New Industries): 57.14%, Cost of Living: 57.14%, Education: 57.14%, Quality of Healthcare: 57.14%, Infrastructure: 38.10%, Public Safety/Crime: 38.10%, Quality of Life: 38.10%
