= Rudel Hodge Jr. =

American politician

Member-elect of the Legislature of the Virgin Islands from the St. Thomas/St. John District
- Assuming office January 11, 2027
- Succeeding: Dwayne M. DeGraff, Ray Fonseca, Milton E. Potter

Personal details
- Born: United States Virgin Islands
- Party: Democratic Party
- Education: Binghamton University (BA); Florida International University College of Law (JD)

Rudel A. Hodge Jr. is a Democratic politician from the United States Virgin Islands.

Hodge was elected to the Legislature of the Virgin Islands in the 2026 United States Virgin Islands general election on November 3, 2026, representing the St. Thomas / St. John District. He finished fifth in the district with 3,963 votes, securing one of the district's seven seats.

Hodge was a delegate to the Sixth Constitutional Convention of the Virgin Islands. Hodge is also licensed to practice law in the United States Virgin Islands and New York. He ran alongside fellow St. Thomas / St. John winners Imani Daniel and Sennai Habtes.

His term begins January 11, 2027.
