= 2026 United States House of Representatives election in the United States Virgin Islands =

2026 United States House of Representatives election in the United States Virgin Islands' at-large district
- November 3, 2026
- Reporting: 100% as of 10:00 PM EDT
Candidate	Janelle Sarauw	Shelley Moorhead
Party	Democratic	Independent
Popular vote	13,029	3,586
Percentage	76.93%	21.17%
Delegate before election
Stacey Plaskett
Democratic
Elected Delegate
Janelle Sarauw
Democratic

The 2026 United States House of Representatives election in the United States Virgin Islands election was held on November 3, 2026, to elect the territory's delegate to the United States House of Representatives to represent the United States Virgin Islands' at-large congressional district. The election coincided with races for other federal and U.S. Virgin Islander territorial offices, including the larger U.S. Virgin Islands general election, as well as the nationwide 2026 United States House of Representatives elections and the 2026 United States elections.

Incumbent Democratic delegate Stacey Plaskett, first elected in 2014 with 90.7% of the vote, originally filed paperwork to run for re-election, but instead chose to run for governor of the Virgin Islands in 2026. Sarauw was elected with 77% of the vote.

== Democratic primary ==
=== Candidates ===
==== Nominee ====
- Janelle Sarauw, former senator of the Virgin Islands Legislature (2017–2023) and independent candidate for lieutenant governor in 2022

==== Eliminated in primary ====
- Delia L. Smith, former United States attorney for the District Court of the Virgin Islands
- Teri Helenese, director of State-Federal Relations and Washington Representative for the Governor of the United States Virgin Islands
- Emmett Hansen, former senator of the Virgin Islands Legislature (2001–2005), Former V.I. Democratic Party chairman, and 2014 candidate for Delegate to Congress

==== Withdrawn ====
- Stacey Plaskett, incumbent House delegate (running for governor)
- Rashida Francis, community advocate (running as a write-in candidate)

=== Endorsements ===
Delia Smith

Territorial legislators

- Madeleine Bordallo, former Guam delegate to the U.S. House of Representatives (2003–2019)
- Donna Christian-Christensen, former U.S. Virgin Islands delegate to the U.S. House of Representatives (1997–2015)

=== Fundraising ===
Campaign finance reports as of July 27, 2026
Candidate	Raised	Spent	Cash on hand
Teri Helenese (D)	$39,899.64	$25,539.43	$14,360.21
Janelle Sarauw (D)	$38,113.00	$36,384.73	$1,728.27
Delia Smith (D)	$30,319.84	$12,316.84	$18,003.00
Source: Federal Election Commission

=== Debates ===
USVI Democratic congressional debate
No.	Date	Venue	Host	Moderator	Participants			
P Participant A Absent N Non-invitee I Invitee W Withdrawn								
P Participant A Absent N Non-invitee I Invitee W Withdrawn					Janelle Sarauw	Delia L. Smith	Nicole Teri Helenese	Emmett Hansen
1	July 9, 2026	St. Croix Educational Complex	Democratic Party of the Virgin Islands	Merlisa George	P	P	P	P

=== Results ===
2026 Democratic delegate primary results
Party	Candidate	Votes	%
Democratic	Janelle Sarauw	4,913	53.21
Democratic	Delia L. Smith	3,007	32.56
Democratic	Teri Helenese	799	8.65
Democratic	Emmett Hansen	493	5.34
Write-in		22	0.24
Total votes		9,234	100.00

== Republican primary ==
=== Candidates ===
==== Did not file ====
- Andrew Giusto (write-in)
- Gavin Solomon, businessman from New York

== Independents ==
=== Candidates ===
==== Declared ====
- Shelley Moorhead, political advocate

==== Disqualified ====
- Antonio Emanuel, Director of the Office of Gun Violence Prevention
- Jed JohnHope, former member of the Virgin Islands Water and Power Authority Board of Directors (2019–2021)
- Brett “Mac” McClafferty, restaurateur
- Ida Smith, candidate for this office in 2024
- James Webber III, former Senator of the Virgin Islands Legislature (2007–2008)

== General election ==
=== Fundraising ===
Campaign finance reports as of October 14, 2026
Candidate	Raised	Spent	Cash on hand
Janelle Sarauw (D)	$72,508	$66,437	$6,071
Source: Federal Election Commission

=== Results ===
2026 United States Virgin Islands' at-large congressional district election
Party	Candidate	Votes	%	±%
Democratic	Janelle Sarauw	13,029	76.93%	
Independent	Shelley Moorhead	3,586	21.17%	
Write-in		321	1.90%	
Total votes				
