= Delia L. Smith =

American lawyer

Delia Smith
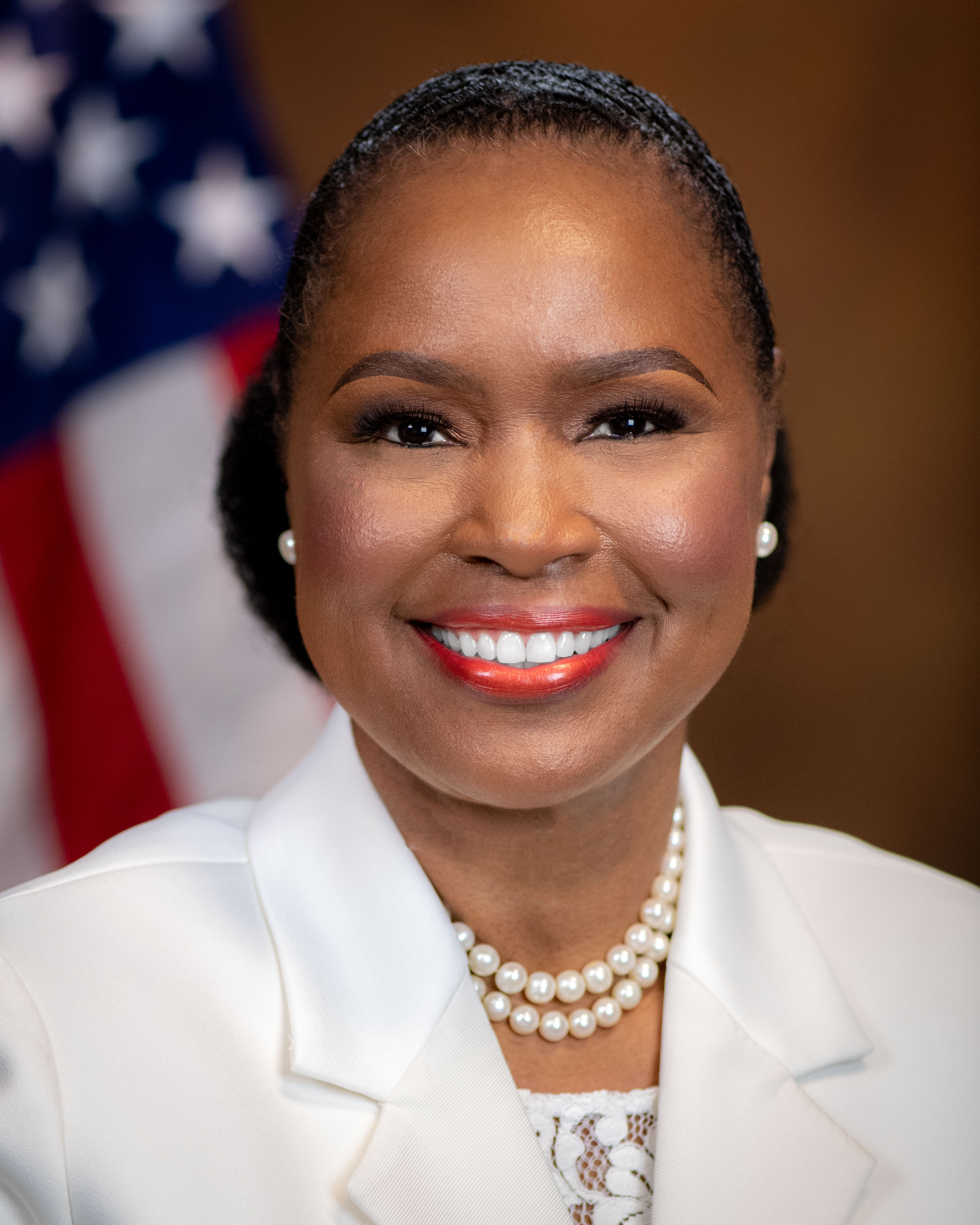

United States Attorney for the District Court of the Virgin Islands
- In office May 3, 2022 – April 14, 2025
- President: Joe Biden; Donald Trump
- Preceded by: Gretchen Shappert
- Succeeded by: Adam Sleeper

Personal details
- Born: St. Thomas, U.S. Virgin Islands
- Party: Democratic
- Education: University of the Virgin Islands (BA); Texas Southern University (JD)

Delia L. Smith is an American lawyer who served as the United States attorney for the District Court of the Virgin Islands from May 2022 to April 2025. She was a Democratic candidate for Delegate to Congress in 2026 coming second to Janelle Sarauw.

== Education ==
Smith received her Bachelor of Arts from the University of the Virgin Islands in 1993 and her Juris Doctor from the Texas Southern University School of Law in 1997.

== Career ==
Smith served as a law clerk for Judge Ishmael Meyers on the United States Virgin Islands Superior Court from 1997 to 1999. From 1999 to 2005, she served as an assistant attorney general in the Office of the Attorney General for the Virgin Islands. From 2012 to 2014, she was detailed to work as a trial attorney in the United States Department of Justice's Office of International Affairs. From 2005 until her appointment as U.S. Attorney, she has served as an Assistant United States Attorney for the District of the Virgin Islands.

=== U.S. attorney for the District of the Virgin Islands ===
On September 28, 2021, President Joe Biden nominated Smith to be the United States attorney for the District Court of the Virgin Islands. Smith was recommended to the White House by Delegate Stacey Plaskett. Her nomination was supported by Governor Albert Bryan Jr. On February 10, 2022, her nomination was reported out of committee by voice vote. On April 27, 2022, her nomination was confirmed in the Senate by voice vote. She assumed office in May 2022. She resigned on April 14, 2025.
