= Clifford Joseph =

Clifford Joseph may refer to:

- Clifford Joseph (footballer) (born 1978), footballer who played for both Dominica and Montserrat
- Clifford A. Joseph, U.S. Virgin Islands politician
- Cliff Joseph (1922–2020), Panama-born American artist, art therapist and activist
