= Hadiya Sewer =

Black feminist & anticolonialist from the Caribbean Virgin Islands

Member elect of the Legislature of the Virgin Islands from the At-Large District
- Assuming office January 11, 2027
- Succeeding: Angel Bolques Jr.

Personal details
- Born: United States Virgin Islands
- Party: Independent
- Education: Spelman College (BA); Brown University (MA); ,(PhD)

Hadiya Sewer is an Independent politician from St. John, United States Virgin Islands who is the Senator At Large elect of the Legislature of the Virgin Islands.

Sewer was elected to the Legislature of the Virgin Islands in the 2026 United States Virgin Islands general election on November 3, 2026, representing the At-Large District. She defeated incumbent Angel Bolques Jr. with 9,981 votes (61.0%) to Bolques's 6,319 votes (38.6%).

Sewer will take office on January 11, 2027.
