= Robert A. Molloy =

American judge (born 1975)

Robert Molloy
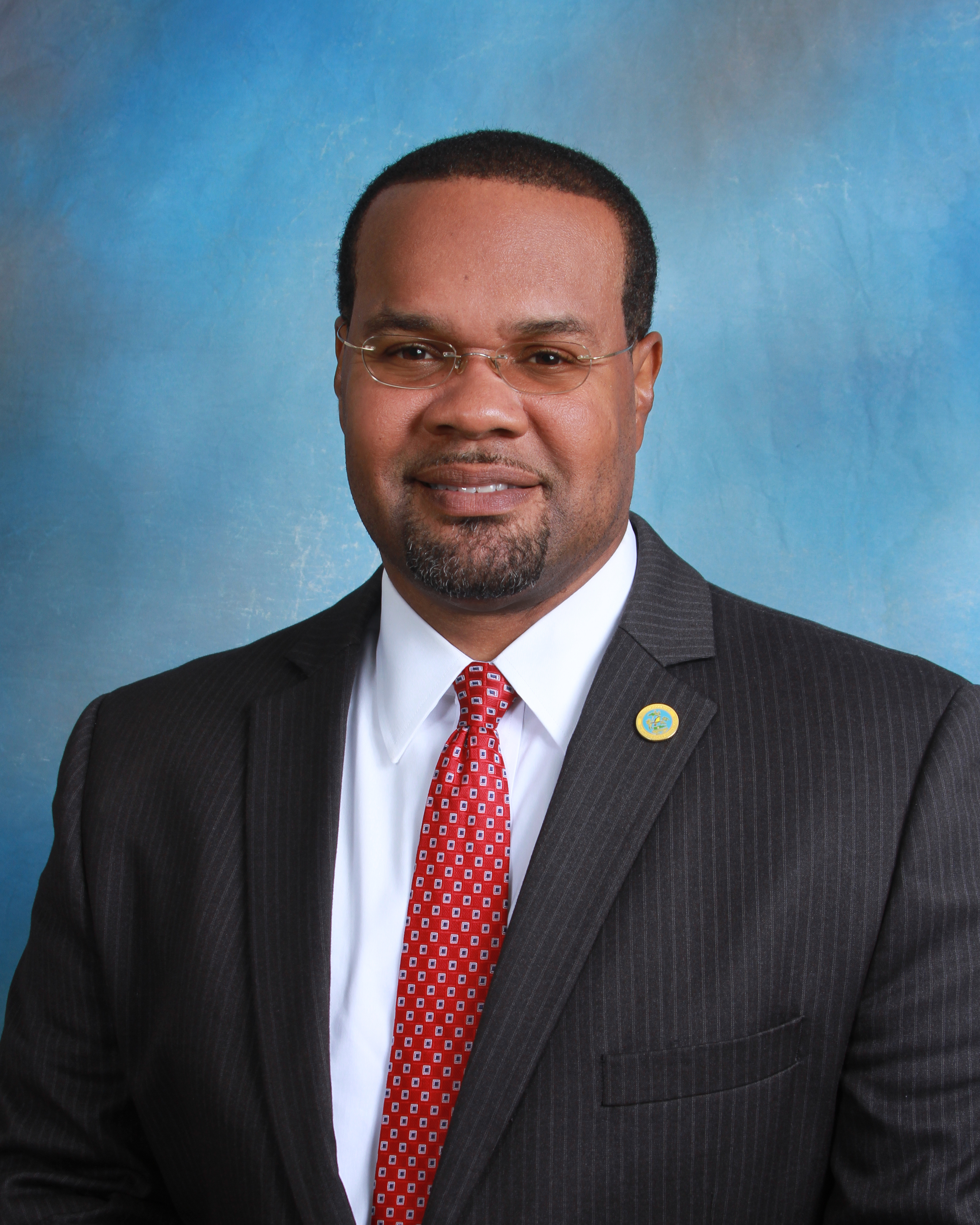

Chief Judge of the District Court of the Virgin Islands
- Incumbent
- Assumed office April 27, 2021
- Preceded by: Wilma A. Lewis

Judge of the District Court of the Virgin Islands
- Incumbent
- Assumed office April 27, 2020
- Appointed by: Donald Trump
- Preceded by: Curtis V. Gómez

Personal details
- Born: Robert Anthony Molloy; November 1975 (age 50) Christiansted, United States Virgin Islands, U.S.
- Party: Democratic
- Education: Hampton University (BS); American University (JD, MBA)

Robert Anthony Molloy (born 1975) is the chief United States district judge of the District Court of the Virgin Islands and former judge of the United States Virgin Islands Superior Court.

== Education ==
Molloy earned a Bachelor of Science degree from Hampton University, a Juris Doctor from American University's Washington College of Law, and a Master of Business Administration from the American University Kogod School of Business.

== Legal career ==
Molloy served as a law clerk to Judge Raymond L. Finch of the District Court of the Virgin Islands. He also served as an Assistant Attorney General of Labor in the Virgin Islands Office of Collective Bargaining.

== Judicial service ==
On July 27, 2013, Virgin Islands Governor John de Jongh Jr. announced Molloy as a nominee for the St. Croix District of the United States Virgin Islands Superior Court. From 2013 to 2020, he served as a Judge of the United States Virgin Islands Superior Court.

== Federal judicial service ==
On May 29, 2019, President Trump announced his intent to nominate Molloy to serve as a judge of the District Court of the Virgin Islands. On June 12, 2019, his nomination was sent to the Senate. President Trump nominated Molloy to the seat occupied by Judge Curtis V. Gomez, whose term of appointment—ten years and until his successor is "chosen and qualified"—was set to expire. His nomination was supported by Delegate Stacey Plaskett. On June 26, 2019, a hearing on his nomination was held before the Senate Judiciary Committee. On July 18, 2019, his nomination was reported out of committee by a voice vote. On February 24, 2020, the United States Senate invoked cloture on his nomination by a 88–1 vote. On February 25, 2020, his nomination was confirmed by a 97–0 vote. He assumed office on April 27, 2020. He became Chief Judge on April 27, 2021.

Legal offices
Preceded by Curtis V. Gómez	Judge of the District Court of the Virgin Islands; 2020–present	Incumbent
Preceded by Wilma A. Lewis	Chief Judge of the District Court of the Virgin Islands; 2021–present	Incumbent
