= Sennai Habtes =

U.S. Virgin Islands politician and scientist

Member-elect of the Legislature of the Virgin Islands from the St. Thomas/St. John District
- Assuming office January 11, 2027
- Succeeding: Dwayne M. DeGraff, Ray Fonseca

Personal details
- Born: St. Thomas, United States Virgin Islands
- Party: Independent
- Education: University of North Carolina at Chapel Hill (BS); University of South Florida (PhD)

Sennai Habtes is an Independent politician and marine scientist from the United States Virgin Islands.

Habtes was elected to the Legislature of the Virgin Islands in the 2026 United States Virgin Islands general election on November 3, 2026, representing the St. Thomas/St. John District. He finished sixth in the district with 3,746 votes.

A St. Thomas native, Habtes earned advanced qualifications in oceanography and served as Chief of Fisheries within the Virgin Islands Department of Planning and Natural Resources.

His term begins January 11, 2027.
