= Imani Daniel =

Member-elect of the Legislature of the Virgin Islands from the St. Thomas/St. John District
- Assuming office January 11, 2027
- Succeeding: Dwayne M. DeGraff, Ray Fonseca, Milton E. Potter

Personal details
- Born: United States Virgin Islands
- Party: Independent
- Education: Johns Hopkins University (BA)
- Website: voteimani.org

Imani Daniel is a U.S. Virgin Islander nonprofit leader, disaster recovery and community development professional who is a member elect of the Legislature of the Virgin Islands. Daniel was elected to the Legislature of the Virgin Islands in the 2026 United States Virgin Islands general election on November 3, 2026, representing the St. Thomas / St. John District. She finished first in a 20-candidate field with 4,516 votes.

She entered the race as a first-time candidate without previous service in the Legislature, running as part of TheFuture political movement. Her professional background includes nonprofit leadership, disaster recovery work, and community development, and she previously served as a delegate to the Sixth Constitutional Convention of the Virgin Islands.

Her term begins January 11, 2027.
