= 2000 United States Virgin Islands Senate referendum =

Ballot measure in the US Virgin Islands

- 7 November 2000

Should the Legislature petition the United States Congress to amend the Revised Organic Act to reduce the size of the Legislature?
For	87.71%
Against	12.29%

If your answer to question 1(a) is "YES", please indicate whether you favor a reduction of senators from 15 to....
Nine	81.67%
Eleven	18.33%

A referendum on the reduction of the Senate was held in the United States Virgin Islands on 7 November 2000. Voters were first asked if they wanted to reduce the size of the Senate from its current membership of 15. They were then asked the reduced size of Senate that they preferred – either nine or eleven seats. While a reduction was overwhelmingly approved and voters chose a reduction to nine seats, the referendum was non-binding and was not implemented.

== Results ==
Favor Reduction of Senate

Choice	Votes	%
Yes	13,162	87.71
No	1,844	12.29
Invalid/blank votes		–
Total	15,006	100
Registered voters/turnout		
Source: Direct Democracy

11 or 9 Seats in reduced Senate

Choice	Votes	%
9 Seats	11,075	81.86
11 Seats	2,454	18.14
Invalid/blank votes		–
Total	13,529	100
Registered voters/turnout		
Source: Direct Democracy
