= Curtis V. Gómez =

American judge (born 1963)

Curtis Gómez
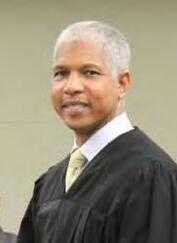
- Gómez in 2012

Senior Judge of the District Court of the Virgin Islands
- Incumbent
- Assumed office April 27, 2020

Chief Judge of the District Court of the Virgin Islands
- In office January 28, 2005 – August 16, 2013
- Preceded by: Raymond L. Finch
- Succeeded by: Wilma A. Lewis

Judge of the District Court of the Virgin Islands
- In office January 28, 2005 – April 27, 2020
- Nominated by: George W. Bush
- Preceded by: Thomas K. Moore
- Succeeded by: Robert A. Molloy

Personal details
- Born: Curtis Vincent Gómez; March 26, 1963 (age 62); Saint Croix, Virgin Islands, U.S.
- Education: George Washington University (BA); Harvard University (JD)

Curtis Vincent Gómez (born March 26, 1963) is a senior United States district judge of the District Court of the Virgin Islands.

== Education ==
Gómez earned a Bachelor of Arts degree from George Washington University and his Juris Doctor from the Harvard Law School.

== Legal career ==
Gómez was an attorney with the law firms of Patton Boggs in the District of Columbia, and Dudley, Topper & Feuerzeig in the Virgin Islands. He served as a federal prosecutor in the Office of the United States Attorney for the District of the Virgin Islands.

== Federal judicial service ==
On November 25, 2003, President George W. Bush nominated Gómez to serve a ten-year term as a United States district judge of the District Court of the Virgin Islands. On April 4, 2004, a hearing on his nomination was held before the Senate Judiciary Committee. On April 29, 2004, the Committee reported his nomination favorably to the senate floor. On November 21, 2004, the full United States Senate confirmed his nomination by voice vote. Gómez assumed senior status on April 27, 2020.

Legal offices
Preceded by Thomas K. Moore	Judge of the District Court of the Virgin Islands; 2005–2020	Succeeded by Robert A. Molloy
Preceded by Raymond L. Finch	Chief Judge of the District Court of the Virgin Islands; 2005–2013	Succeeded by Wilma A. Lewis
