= Thomas K. Moore =

American judge (born 1938)

Tom Moore

Senior Judge of the District Court of the Virgin Islands
- In office January 3, 2005 – 2018

Chief Judge of the District Court of the Virgin Islands
- In office October 17, 1990 – 1999
- Preceded by: Almeric L. Christian
- Succeeded by: Raymond L. Finch

Judge of the District Court of the Virgin Islands
- In office August 14, 1992 – January 3, 2005
- Appointed by: George H. W. Bush
- Preceded by: Almeric L. Christian
- Succeeded by: Curtis V. Gómez

Personal details
- Born: Thomas Kail Moore; January 15, 1938 (age 87) Idaho Falls, Idaho, U.S.
- Education: Harvard University (BA); Georgetown University (JD)

Thomas Kail Moore (born January 15, 1938) was a judge of the District Court of the Virgin Islands from 1992 to 2005.

Moore was born in Idaho Falls, Idaho. He graduated from Harvard College with a AB in 1961 and from the Georgetown University Law Center in 1967 with a JD. From 1961 to 1966, he served in the United States Air Force. After graduating from law school, he clerked for Judge John A. Danaher of the United States Court of Appeals for the District of Columbia Circuit.

Afterwards, he was general counsel for the United States Department of Transportation. He was then assistant attorney for the United States District Court for the District of Columbia, United States District Court for the Eastern District of Virginia, and finally the District Court of the Virgin Islands. In 1981, he went into private practice in the United States Virgin Islands. In 1992, he was nominated for a judgeship in the Virgin Islands by George H. W. Bush. He was chief justice from 1992 to 1999. Afterwards, he returned to private practice.

Legal offices
Preceded by Almeric L. Christian	Judge of the District Court of the Virgin Islands; 1992–2005	Succeeded by Curtis V. Gómez
Preceded by Almeric L. Christian	Chief Judge of the District Court of the Virgin Islands; 1992–1999	Succeeded by Raymond L. Finch
