= Almeric L. Christian =

American judge (1919–1999)

Almeric Leander Christian (November 23, 1919 – September 1, 1999) was an American judge who became the first native of the United States Virgin Islands to be appointed to the District Court of the Virgin Islands. First appointed in 1969 by President Richard Nixon, Christian served as chief judge from 1970 until his retirement in 1988. His judicial opinions significantly shaped the legal landscape of the U.S. Virgin Islands, and a federal courthouse in St. Croix was named in his honor.

== Early life, education, and career ==
Born in Christiansted on the island of St. Croix, he graduated from Christiansted High School, and then attended the University of Puerto Rico, Río Piedras Campus for two years before transferring to Columbia University in New York City, where he received a B.A. in government and economics in 1942.

He entered Columbia Law School, but paused his studies to serve in the United States Army in World War II. He was commissioned as a second lieutenant in the United States Army Coast Artillery Corps, and served in the Normandy Campaign and in the Asiatic-Pacific theater. He resumed his studies in 1946, receiving his law degree from Columbia before passing the New York State Bar in June 1947.

== Government service ==
In November 1954, President Dwight D. Eisenhower named Christian to a commission to study the application of United States federal laws to the Virgin Islands.

President John F. Kennedy appointed him United States Attorney for the Virgin Islands in 1962, and President Lyndon B. Johnson reappointed him in 1966.

In 1969, President Richard Nixon appointed Christian to the District Court of the Virgin Islands, making him the first Virgin Islander to serve as a federal judge on that court. He was appointed chief judge in June 1970 and was reappointed in 1978 by President Jimmy Carter. During his sixteen years on the bench, Christian authored several landmark decisions with lasting impact on Virgin Islands law, including:

Red Hook Marina v. Antilles Yachting Corp., which established the open beach law in the Virgin Islands.
Thomas v. Government of the Virgin Islands, which led to the enactment of the Virgin Islands Tort Claims Act.
Hosier v. Evans, and Chapman v. Gerard, companion cases that recognized the constitutional rights of non-citizen children from neighboring Caribbean islands to attend public schools in the Virgin Islands.

Another noted case heard by Christian was the custody dispute between Yoko Ono and her former husband, producer Anthony Cox, regarding her child born prior to Ono's marriage to John Lennon, which Christian decided in Ono's favor in 1971.

In 1986, Christian notified President Ronald Reagan of his intent to step down upon appointment of a successor. However, no appointment was made, and Christian retired from the federal bench in October 1988. His retirement, and the death of another judge, left the court short-staffed. From 1990 to 1993, he returned to the bench as a senior sitting judge on the Territorial Court of the Virgin Islands.

== Personal life and death ==
Christian and his wife, Shirley, had three children, including Virgin Islands congressional delegate Donna Christensen.

Christian lost his sight in early 1999 and his health declined in the final months of his life. He died on September 1, 1999, in a hospital in Puerto Rico, at the age of 79.

Political offices
Preceded by Walter A. Gordon	Judge of the District Court of the Virgin Islands	Succeeded by Thomas K. Moore
