= Janelle Sarauw =

United States Virgin Islands politician

Delegate-elect to the U.S. House of Representatives from the U.S. Virgin Islands' at-large district
- Assuming office January 3, 2027
- Succeeding: Stacey Plaskett

Member of the U.S. Virgin Islands Legislature
- In office July 14, 2017 – January 9, 2023
- Preceded by: Kevin Rodriquez
- Succeeded by: Ray Fonseca

Personal details
- Born: Janelle Karen Sarauw; September 27, 1985 (age 41) St. Thomas, U.S. Virgin Islands
- Party: Democratic (2006–2012, 2026–present); Independent (2012–2026)
- Relations: Ivan Buchanan (grandfather)
- Education: Florida Atlantic University (BA); Gonzaga University (MA)

Janelle Karen Sarauw (born September 27, 1985) is a U.S. Virgin Islander politician and former educator who served as senator in the Legislature of the Virgin Islands from the St. Thomas-St. John District, from 2017 to 2023. She became the first LGBTQ member and youngest woman to serve in the territory's legislature. Sarauw unsuccessfully ran for Lieutenant Governor in the general election. Sarauw successfully ran for Delegate to Congress in 2026 and won with 77% of the vote.

== Early life and education ==
Sarauw was born on St. Thomas to Levron Sarauw Sr. of Frederiksted, St. Croix and Carla Buchanan of Cayon, St. Kitts. The youngest of two children, Sarauw graduated from Charlotte Amalie High School in 2003. Sarauw attended Florida Atlantic University, where she earned a bachelor's degree in political science. She also received her master's degree in Organizational leadership at Gonzaga University. She is a granddaughter of Ivan Buchanan, former Speaker of the National Assembly of Saint Kitts and Nevis.

== Career ==
Sarauw taught U.S. history at Charlotte Amalie High School from 2007 to 2010. She joined the Department of Sports, Parks and Recreation to be a Sports coordinator. Prior to becoming a senator, Sarauw was an Assistant chief researcher for the Office of the Lieutenant Governor and worked as a part-time professor on political science at the University of the Virgin Islands.

== Legislative career ==
Sarauw, then chair of the Committee on Rules and Judiciary, during a committee meeting at the Capitol Building, St. Thomas, November 12, 2020.

Sarauw was sworn in as the 15th member of the 32nd Legislature on July 14, 2017.

=== Elections ===
==== 2016 ====
Sarauw ran for the Senate ending up in 8th place. On December 9, 2016, Sarauw and campaign volunteer, Brigitte Berry filed a complaint in the Superior Court against Kevin Rodríquez, St. Thomas & St. John Board of Elections, Virgin Islands Board of Elections and Supervisor of Elections Caroline F. Fawkes. They alleged that Rodríquez was not qualified to serve in the legislature because he hadn't been "a bona fide resident of the Virgin Islands for at least three years next preceding the date of his election."

==== 2017 ====
Sarauw won a special election receiving 1,292 votes over former Senator Justin Harrigan Sr. who came in second place with 900 votes.

==== 2018 ====
Sarauw won re-election with 5,339 votes.

==== 2020 ====
Sarauw won re-election coming in second place with 4,827 votes.

=== Committee assignments ===
32nd Legislature

- Committee on Rules and Judiciary
- Committee on Education and Workforce Development
- Committee on Consumer Affairs and Culture
- Committee on Youth, Sports, Parks and Recreation

33rd Legislature

- Committee on Rules and Judiciary (Chair)

34th Legislature

- Committee on Housing, Transportation, and Telecommunications
- Committee on Health, Hospitals and Human Services
- Committee on Education and Workforce Development (Vice Chair)
- Committee on Disaster Recovery and Infrastructure (Chair)
- Committee on Finance
- Committee on the Whole
  - Subcommittee on Energy and Infrastructure Development (Chair)

=== Lieutenant gubernatorial campaign ===
In May 2022, Sarauw was chosen by fellow senator Kurt Vialet to be his running mate in the 2022 gubernatorial election.

== Personal life ==
Sarauw was crowned St. Thomas Carnival Queen in 2003.

== See also ==
- List of African-American LGBTQ people
- List of African-American United States representatives
- List of LGBTQ members of the United States Congress
- Women in the United States House of Representatives

U.S. House of Representatives
Preceded by Stacey Plaskett	Delegate to the U.S. House of Representatives from the United States Virgin Islands's at-large congressional district Taking office 2027	Elect
