= Herman Liburd =

Herman W. Liburd

Speaker of the National Assembly of Saint Kitts and Nevis
- In office 1980–1983
- Prime Minister: Kennedy Simmonds
- Preceded by: Ada Mae Edwards
- Succeeded by: Ivan Buchanan

Personal details
- Born: 2 April 1941 Nevis
- Died: 12 April 2019 (aged 78)
- Party: Nevis Reformation Party

Herman W. Liburd, JP, was a politician from Saint Kitts and Nevis.

Liburd was born in Nevis on 2 April 1941. He was a lawyer by profession, newspaper columnist, and legal advisor of the Nevis Island Administration. He had law degrees from University of Toronto in 1973 and Hugh Wooding Law School in Trinidad and Tobago in 1978.

Liburd was the Speaker of House of Assembly of Saint Kitts and Nevis and Anguilla from 1980 to 1983. He led the legislature during the coalition of People's Action Movement and Nevis Reformation Party. Ivan Buchanan replaced him as the speaker, and Liburd became Nevis' solicitor general.

He died on 12 April 2019.
