= Walter A. Gordon =

American judge (1894–1976)

Walter Gordon
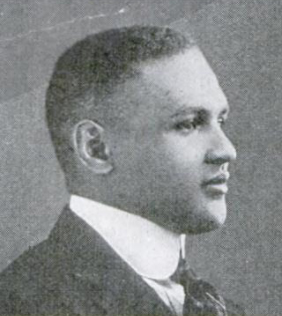

Judge of the United States District Court of the Virgin Islands
- In office c. September 25, 1958 – October 1, 1968
- Appointed by: Dwight D. Eisenhower
- Preceded by: Herman Moore
- Succeeded by: Almeric L. Christian

18th Governor of the United States Virgin Islands
- In office October 17, 1955 – September 25, 1958
- Lieutenant: John David Merwin
- Preceded by: Charles Claunch (Acting)
- Succeeded by: John David Merwin

Personal details
- Born: Walter Arthur Gordon; October 10, 1894 Atlanta, Georgia, U.S.
- Died: April 2, 1976 (aged 81) Piedmont, California, U.S.
- Party: Republican
- Spouse: Elizabeth Fisher
- Education: University of California, Berkeley (BA, JD)
- Football career

Personal information
- Listed height: 6 ft 0 in (1.83 m)
- Listed weight: 196 lb (89 kg)

Career information
- High school: Riverside Poly (California)
- College: California (Berkeley) (1916–1918)
- College Football Hall of Fame (Class of 1975)

Walter Arthur Gordon (October 10, 1894 – April 2, 1976) was the first African American to receive a JD from University of California, Berkeley School of Law. He had an extremely long and varied career where he served as a police officer, lawyer, assistant football coach, member of the California Adult Authority, Governor of the United States Virgin Islands, and a Federal District Judge.

== Early life and education ==
Gordon was born in Atlanta, Georgia, though his family moved to Riverside, California in 1904. He graduated from Riverside Polytechnic High School before enrolling in the University of California, Berkeley, where he lettered in football (as a lineman for the California Golden Bears), boxing, and wrestling.

Gordon was the star of Cal's boxing team, winning the California State Championship. He was the star of Cal's wrestling team, winning the California State Championship in that sport as well. He was also a star on college football Hall of Fame coach Andy Smith's early Cal football teams, playing on both the offensive and defensive lines. In fact, during his Cal football career, at one time or another he played every position on both lines except center. At 6'0" and 200 pounds, he was one of the biggest men on the team, but with tremendous quickness, and an instinct for knowing where to be on the field.

He was a member of Alpha Phi Alpha fraternity. He was also a founding member of the Alpha Epsilon chapter at University of California, Berkeley.

In 1918 he became one of the first two African-American All-Americans (the first was Paul Robeson). He was later named to the College Football Hall of Fame. He graduated in 1918 and enrolled in Boalt Hall to study law. He married Mary Elizabeth Fisher on July 22, 1920 and received his Doctor of Jurisprudence degree in 1922.

In April 1950 Gordon was the featured subject of an episode of This Is Your Life on NBC radio.

== Careers in California ==
In 1919, Gordon began two of his careers: he was hired as a scout and part-time assistant coach of the Golden Bears and joined the police force in Berkeley, California. In 1922, he began his third career and opened a law office in Oakland, California. He continued all three jobs until 1930, when he retired from the police force. He was branch president of the Berkeley NAACP in the 1930s. During the Zoot Suit Riots of Los Angeles in 1943 there were clashes between Mexican American youths and servicemen. Governor Earl Warren sent a team, headed by Walter Gordon, to Los Angeles to evaluate the conflict. Later in 1943, he retired as the assistant coach to join the California Adult Authority, that state's parole board, and eventually became chairman, serving for nine years. In 1944, he retired from law.

== Careers in the United States Virgin Islands ==
In 1955, while still working for the Adult Authority, he was appointed Governor of the United States Virgin Islands. That same year, he was named as UC Berkeley alumnus of the year and received the Benjamin Ide Wheeler Medal. In 1958, he resigned as Governor to take an appointment as a Federal Judge of the District Court of the Virgin Islands, where he served for 10 years.

Political offices
Preceded by Charles Claunch; Acting	Governor of the United States Virgin Islands; 1955–1958	Succeeded by John David Merwin
Legal offices
Preceded by Herman Moore	Judge of the United States District Court of the Virgin Islands; 1958–1968	Succeeded by Almeric L. Christian
