= Raymond L. Finch =

American judge (1940–2023)

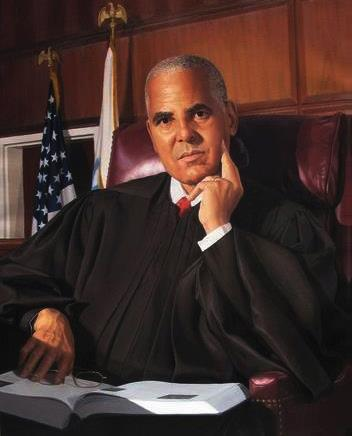

Senior Judge of the District Court of the Virgin Islands
- In office August 15, 2008 – August 22, 2018

Chief Judge of the District Court of the Virgin Islands
- In office 1999–2005
- Preceded by: Thomas K. Moore
- Succeeded by: Curtis V. Gómez

Judge of the District Court of the Virgin Islands
- In office September 1, 1994 – August 15, 2008
- Nominated by: Bill Clinton; George W. Bush
- Preceded by: David V. O'Brien
- Succeeded by: Wilma A. Lewis

Judge of the Territorial Court of the Virgin Islands
- In office 1976–1994
- Nominated by: Cyril King

Personal details
- Born: October 4, 1940 Christiansted, U.S. Virgin Islands
- Died: February 23, 2023 (aged 82)
- Education: Howard University (BA, LLB)

Raymond Lawrence Finch (October 4, 1940 – February 23, 2023) was an American judge. He served as a judge of the District Court of the Virgin Islands from 1994 to 2018.

== Early life ==
Finch was born on Saint Croix, in Christiansted, the son of Wilfred C. and Beryl Finch. He graduated from Christiansted High School in 1958, Howard University with a B.A. in Political Science in 1962, and Howard University School of Law with an LL.B. in 1965.

He served as law clerk to Alexander Farrelly and Antonio L. Joseph of the Municipal Court of the Virgin Islands. He served as a judge advocate in the U.S. Army in Vietnam from 1966 to 1969, first as a first lieutenant, then as a captain, earning a Bronze Star Medal. He then joined the law firm of Hodge & Sheen, and was admitted to the Virgin Islands Bar in 1970. He became a partner in the firm of Hodge, Sheen, Finch & Ross the following year. He was appointed by Governor Cyril King as a judge of the Municipal Court in 1976. He served on the court, which was renamed the Territorial Court the following year, until 1994.

== District Court of the Virgin Islands ==
Finch was nominated to the District Court of the Virgin Islands by George H. W. Bush on June 19, 1992. His nomination expired later that year. On March 22, 1994, he was nominated to the same court by Bill Clinton, and he was confirmed by the United States Senate on May 6, 1994. He was sworn in on September 1, 1994, and served as the Chief Judge of the District Court from 1999 to 2005. As his 10-year term was expiring, Finch was renominated to the same court by George W. Bush on February 2, 2004, and was confirmed by the Senate on November 21, 2004. He assumed senior status on August 15, 2008. He ended his judicial service on August 22, 2018.

Legal offices
Preceded by David V. O'Brien	Judge of the District Court of the Virgin Islands; 1994–2008	Succeeded by Wilma A. Lewis
Preceded by Thomas K. Moore	Chief Judge of the District Court of the Virgin Islands; 1999–2005	Succeeded by Curtis V. Gómez
