= Ivan Buchanan =

Ivan Charles Buchanan

Speaker of the National Assembly of Saint Kitts and Nevis
- In office 1983–1995
- Prime Minister: Kennedy Simmonds
- Preceded by: Herman Liburd
- Succeeded by: Walford Gumbs

Personal details
- Born: 28 January 1921 Sandy Point, St Kitts
- Died: 14 January 2019 (aged 97)

Ivan Charles Buchanan (28 January 1921 – 14 January 2019) was a politician from Saint Kitts and Nevis.

== Career ==
He was born on 28 January 1921 in Sandy Point, St Kitts. He got teacher training in St Kitts. He worked as a civil servant for 27 years, and as a primary school teacher and later as public health inspector. He worked also as director for the St Kitts Nevis Anguilla National Bank.

He was the Speaker of House of Assembly of Saint Kitts and Nevis and Anguilla from 1983 to 1985, and then the Speaker of the National Assembly from 6 February 1985 to 1995. He led the legislature during the coalition of People's Action Movement and Nevis Reformation Party.

== Personal life ==
He died on 14 January 2019 at the age of 97. One of his granddaughters, Janelle Sarauw, was elected to the legislature of U.S. Virgin Islands in 2017.
