= Wilma A. Lewis =

American judge (born 1956)

Wilma Lewis
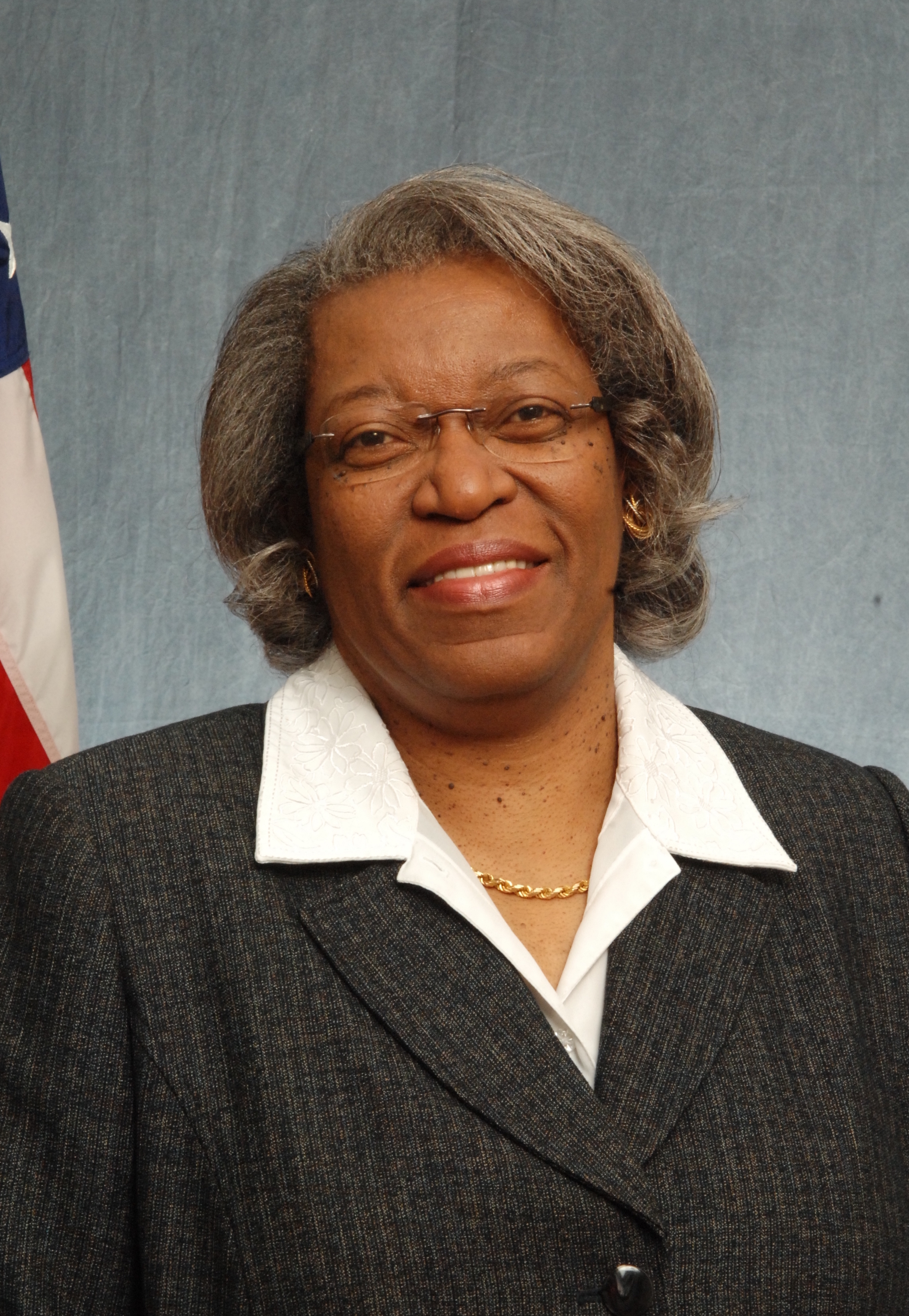
- Official portrait, 2009

Senior Judge of the District Court of the Virgin Islands
- Incumbent
- Assumed office February 15, 2025

Chief Judge of the District Court of the Virgin Islands
- In office August 16, 2013 – April 27, 2021
- Preceded by: Curtis V. Gomez
- Succeeded by: Robert A. Molloy

Judge of the District Court of the Virgin Islands
- In office November 10, 2011 – February 15, 2025
- Nominated by: Barack Obama
- Preceded by: Raymond L. Finch
- Succeeded by: Evan Rikhye

United States Attorney for the District of Columbia
- In office January 1998 – April 2001
- President: Bill Clinton
- Preceded by: Mary Leary (acting)
- Succeeded by: Roscoe Howard

Inspector General of the Department of the Interior
- In office April 10, 1995 – January 8, 1998
- President: Bill Clinton
- Preceded by: Joyce Fleischman (acting)
- Succeeded by: Robert Williams (acting)

Personal details
- Born: Wilma Antoinette Lewis; June 28, 1956 (age 70) Santurce, Puerto Rico, U.S.
- Education: Swarthmore College (BA); Harvard University (JD)

Wilma Antoinette Lewis (born June 28, 1956) is a senior United States district judge of the District Court of the Virgin Islands. She previously served as the first female United States Attorney for the District of Columbia.

== Early life and education ==
Lewis was born in Santurce, Puerto Rico and raised in Saint Thomas, U.S. Virgin Islands. Her parents, Walter and Juta Lewis, were both federal civil servants, working for the United States Postal Service and the United States Customs Service, respectively. Lewis graduated as the valedictorian of her class at All Saints Cathedral School in 1974 and earned degrees from Swarthmore College in 1978 and Harvard Law School in 1981.

== Career ==
Lewis worked in the litigation department at Steptoe & Johnson until 1986, when she joined the U.S. Attorney's Office in Washington, D.C. She rose through the civil division to become deputy chief of the division in 1993. That year, she departed for the United States Department of the Interior, where she served as Associate Solicitor for the Division of General Law. In 1995, she was nominated by President Clinton and confirmed by the Senate as Inspector General of the Department of the Interior. She became the first Black woman to serve in this position.

In 1998, Lewis was nominated and confirmed as United States attorney for the District of Columbia, the first woman to serve in that position. She served from January 1998 to April 2001, when she became a partner in the litigation group at Crowell & Moring. From October 2007 to December 2008, she served as managing associate general counsel at Freddie Mac. In 2009, President Barack Obama nominated Lewis to be Assistant Secretary of the Interior for Land and Minerals Management.

=== District court service ===
In 2011 she was appointed to the District Court of the Virgin Islands. In August 2013, she was named to a seven-year term as Chief Judge of the court. Her term as Chief Judge ended on April 27, 2021. Her 10-year term as District Judge expired in November 2021; but she continued to serve as a "holdover judge" until she or another judge was nominated to a new term. She assumed senior status on February 15, 2025.

Legal offices
Preceded by Raymond L. Finch	Judge of the District Court of the Virgin Islands; 2011–2025	Succeeded by Evan Rikhye
Preceded by Curtis V. Gomez	Chief Judge of the District Court of the Virgin Islands; 2013–2021	Succeeded by Robert A. Molloy
