= Evan Rikhye =

American judge (born 1971)

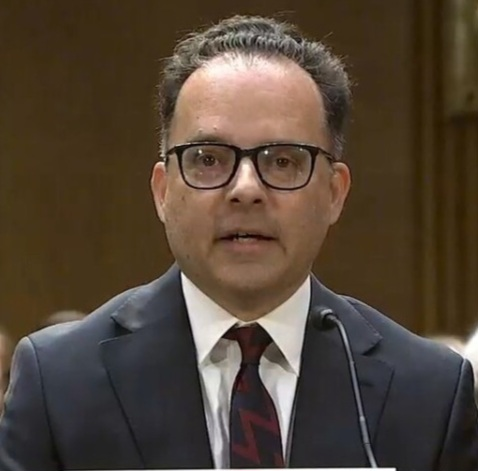
- Rikhye in 2026

Judge of the District Court of the Virgin Islands
- Incumbent
- Assumed office May 28, 2026
- Appointed by: Donald Trump
- Preceded by: Wilma A. Lewis

Personal details
- Born: 1971 (age 54–55) Boston, Massachusetts, U.S.
- Education: American University (BA, JD)

Evan Rikhye (born 1971) is an American lawyer who serves as a United States district judge for the District Court of the Virgin Islands. Previously, Rikhye served as an assistant United States attorney on Saint Croix from 2008 to 2011 and resumed the role from 2021 to 2024.

== Education ==
Rikhye was born in 1971, in Boston, Massachusetts. He received his Bachelor of Arts degree in 1993 from American University School of International Service and his Juris Doctor from American University Washington College of Law in 2001.

== Career ==
From 2003 to 2004, Rikhye worked for the Federal Election Commission. From 2004 to 2006, he worked in the United States Department of Justice Office of Legal Policy. From 2006 to 2008, Rikhye worked as an assistant attorney general in the United States Department of Justice Civil Rights Division. He served as an assistant United States attorney on Saint Croix from 2008 to 2011 and again from 2021 to 2024. From 2024 to 2026, Rikhye served as senior counsel for Walmart in Bentonville, Arkansas.

=== District court service ===
On February 12, 2026, President Donald Trump announced his intention to nominate Rikhye to the seat on the District Court of the Virgin Islands vacated by Judge Wilma A. Lewis. On March 2, 2026, Trump formally transmitted Rikhye's nomination to the United States Senate. On March 25, 2026, the Senate Judiciary Committee held a hearing on his nomination. On April 30, 2026, the Senate Judiciary Committee reported his nomination to the floor on a 12–10 party-line vote. On May 19, 2026, the Senate invoked cloture on his nomination by a 50–47 vote. The following day, the Senate confirmed his nomination by a 52–47 vote. He assumed office on May 28, 2026.

Legal offices
Preceded by Wilma A. Lewis	Judge of the District Court of the Virgin Islands; 2026–present	Incumbent
