= Clifford Joseph (footballer) =

Montserratian footballer

Personal information
- Date of birth: 26 September 1978 (age 48)
- Place of birth: Dominica
- Height: 5 ft 8 in (1.73 m)
- Positions: Midfielder; defender

Senior career*
Years	Team	Apps	(Gls)
2004–?	Ideal SC		

International career
2000	Dominica	1	(0)
2004–2011	Montserrat	8	(0)
- * Club domestic league appearances and goals

Clifford Joseph (born 26 September 1978) is a footballer who played for two national football teams.

== International career ==
Joseph made his international debut playing for Dominica in 2000, during the 2002 FIFA World Cup qualification. This remained his only cap for Dominica. He then later went on to make eight appearances for Montserrat between 2004 and 2011.

== Style of play ==
He's known as a utility player because Clifford could play in any position on the pitch, including in goal which he once did for Montserrat in a World Cup Qualifier.
