= Supreme Court of the Virgin Islands =

Highest court in the territory of the United States Virgin Islands

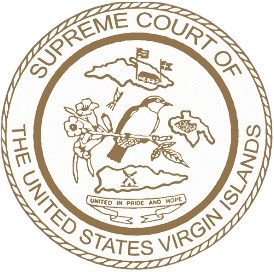
- Established: 2007 (19 years ago)
- Jurisdiction: United States Virgin Islands
- Composition method: Gubernatorial selection with legislative advice and consent
- Authorized by: Legislature of the Virgin Islands via Act No. 6687, 2004 V. I. Sess. Laws 179 (codified at 4 V.I.C. ch. 2)
- Appeals to: Supreme Court of the United States
- Appeals from: Superior Court of the Virgin Islands
- Judge term length: 10 years
- Number of positions: 5
- Website: visupremecourt.hosted.civiclive.com

Chief Justice of the Virgin Islands
- Currently: Rhys Hodge

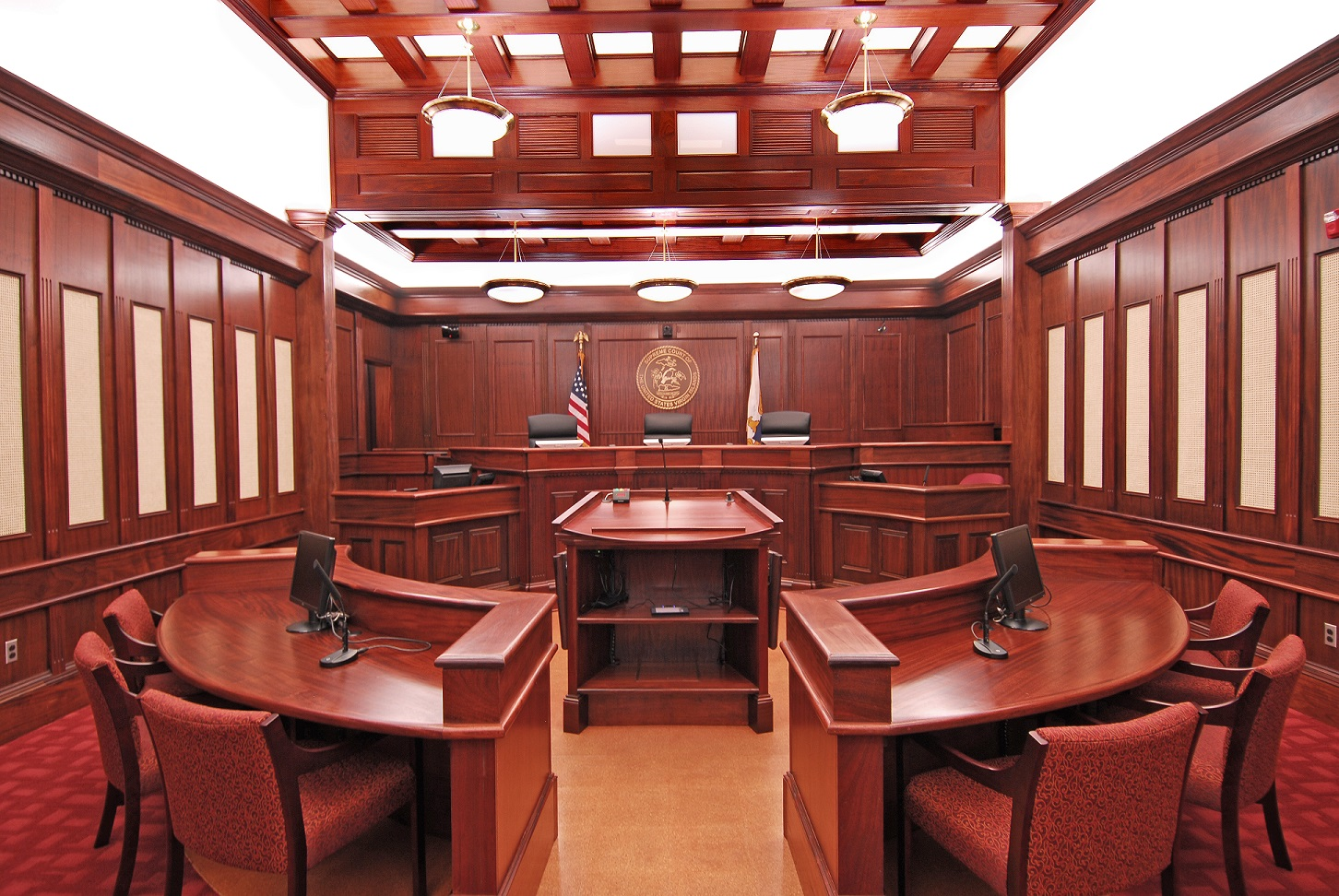
Interior of the Virgin Islands Supreme Court

The Supreme Court of the Virgin Islands is the highest court in the territory of the United States Virgin Islands. The Supreme Court assumed jurisdiction over all appeals from the Superior Court of the Virgin Islands, a trial level court, on January 29, 2007. The Supreme Court currently consists of a Chief Justice and three associate justices, but up to four associate justices may be appointed. Supreme Court justices are each appointed by the Governor and confirmed by the Legislature for a ten-year term. There is no intermediate court of appeals, and the Supreme Court does not have discretion in hearing appeals. Appeals of Supreme Court decisions were heard by writ of certiorari by the United States Court of Appeals for the Third Circuit until December 29, 2012, but since then they have been heard by the Supreme Court of the United States in Washington, DC.

On June 19, 2012, after a review of finished cases, the Third Circuit recommended that appeals from the Supreme Court go to the U.S. Supreme Court instead of the Third Circuit. In July 2012, Delegate to Congress Donna M. Christensen (D-VI) introduced a bill to shorten the time from 15 years from the Supreme Court's inauguration in 2007 to immediately upon bill passage for this to take effect, and the bill passed the House of Representatives in November and the Senate in December 2012. President Barack Obama signed the bill into law on December 29, 2012, and all appeals from Supreme Court decisions from that day forward go to the U.S. Supreme Court.

The court was expanded from three to five seats in 2016.

== Current justices ==
Name	Start	Chief term	Term ends	Appointer	Law school
Rhys Hodge, Chief Justice	December 18, 2006	2006–present	2026	Charles Turnbull (D)	Rutgers-Camden
Maria Cabret	December 18, 2006	–	2026	Charles Turnbull (D)	Howard
Ive Swan	December 18, 2006	–	2026	Charles Turnbull (D)	Howard
Harold Willocks	November 8, 2024	–	2034	Albert Bryan (D)	Antioch
Denise Francois	May 28, 2026	–	2036	Albert Bryan (D)	San Diego

=== Vacancy and pending nomination ===
Vacator	Reason	Vacancy Date	Nominee	Nomination Date
Maria Cabret	Retired	December 31, 2026	Pending	TBD
Rhys Hodge	Retired	December 31, 2026	Pending	TBD
Ive Swan	Retired	December 31, 2026	Pending	TBD
