= District Court of the Virgin Islands =

United States territorial court

- (D.V.I.)
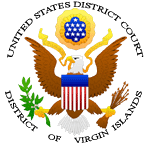
- Location: Saint Croix More locations: Charlotte Amalie; Saint John
- Appeals to: Third Circuit
- Established: 1936
- Authority: Article IV tribunal
- Created by: 48 U.S.C. §§ 1611–1617
- Composition method: Presidential nomination with Senate advice and consent
- Judges: 2
- Judge term length: 10 years (and until successor is chosen and qualified)
- Chief Judge: Robert A. Molloy

Officers of the court
- U.S. Attorney: Adam Sleeper
- U.S. Marshal: Kwesi Howard (acting)
- www.vid.uscourts.gov

The District Court of the Virgin Islands (in case citations, D.V.I.) is a United States territorial court with jurisdiction over federal and diversity actions in the United States Virgin Islands, a United States territory and more specifically an insular area that is an unincorporated organized territory. The court sits in both St. Croix and St. Thomas. Unlike their counterparts on other United States district courts, judges on the District Court of the Virgin Islands do not have life tenure, as the court is not an Article III court. Instead, the court is an Article IV court, created pursuant to Congress's Article IV, Section 3 powers. Judges serve for terms of ten years at a time, and until a successor is chosen and qualified. Appeals of the court's decisions are taken to the United States Court of Appeals for the Third Circuit in Philadelphia.

The District Court used to have jurisdiction over all local civil actions brought in the Virgin Islands, but in 1976 the Virgin Islands Legislature—as allowed by the Revised Organic Act of 1954—gave a portion of this jurisdiction to the former Territorial Court of the Virgin Islands, at that time the local trial court. The jurisdiction of the Territorial Court was expanded to all civil actions in 1990. Similarly, the Legislature gave the Territorial Court jurisdiction over certain criminal actions brought under Virgin Islands law in 1985 and expanded that jurisdiction to all criminal cases in 1993, although the United States Attorney may still bring certain criminal actions in the District Court in some circumstances. In 2004 the Territorial Court was renamed the Superior Court of the Virgin Islands.

Before the creation of the Supreme Court of the Virgin Islands in 2007, the Appellate Division of the District Court heard appeals from the Superior Court in three-judge panels. From 2007, the Supreme Court hears these appeals exclusively, with its decisions subject to review by the United States Supreme Court if that court decides to grant certiorari.

The current United States attorney for the District of the Virgin Islands is Adam Sleeper.

== Current judges ==
As of May 28, 2026:

#	Title	Judge	Duty station	Born	Term of service			Appointed by
#	Title	Judge	Duty station	Born	Active	Chief	Senior	Appointed by
12	Chief Judge	Robert A. Molloy	Saint Croix	1975	2020–present	2021–present	—	Trump
13	District Judge	Evan Rikhye	St. John; St. Thomas	1971	2026–present	—	—	Trump
10	Senior Judge	Curtis V. Gómez	inactive	1963	2005–2020	2005–2013	2020–present	G.W. Bush
11	Senior Judge	Wilma A. Lewis	Saint Croix	1956	2011–2025	2013–2021	2025–present	Obama

== Former judges ==
#	Judge	Born–died	Active service	Chief Judge	Senior status	Appointed by	Reason for termination
1	George Philip Jones	1877–1954	1936–1937	—	—	F. Roosevelt	not confirmed
2	William H. Hastie	1904–1976	1937–1939	—	—	F. Roosevelt	resignation
3	Herman E. Moore	1892–1980	1939–1957	—	—	F. Roosevelt	retirement
4	Walter A. Gordon	1894–1976	1958–1968	—	—	Eisenhower	expiration of term
5	Almeric L. Christian	1919–1999	1969–1990	1971–1988	1990–1993	Nixon	retirement
6	Warren H. Young	1916–1980	1971–1980	—	—	Nixon	death
7	David V. O'Brien	1932–1989	1981–1989	1988–1989	—	Reagan	death
8	Thomas K. Moore	1938	1992–2005	1992–1999	—	G.H.W. Bush	expiration of term
9	Raymond L. Finch	1940–2023	1994–2008	1999–2005	2008–2018	Clinton; G.W. Bush (reappointment)	retirement

== See also ==
- Courts of the United States
- List of current United States district judges
- List of United States federal courthouses in the Virgin Islands
- Politics of the United States Virgin Islands
