= Franklin D. Johnson =

United States Virgin Islands politician

Member of the Virgin Islands Legislature from the St. Croix district
- Incumbent
- Assumed office January 11, 2021

Senior Policy Advisor to the Governor
- In office January 2015 – January 2019

Personal details
- Born: September 9, 1960 (age 65) Frederiksted, Saint Croix
- Political party: Independent
- Children: 5

Franklin D. Johnson (born September 9, 1960) is an U.S. Virgin Islander politician. He serves as an Independent member for the St. Croix district of the Virgin Islands Legislature.
