= Hubert L. Frederick =

American Virgin Islander politician

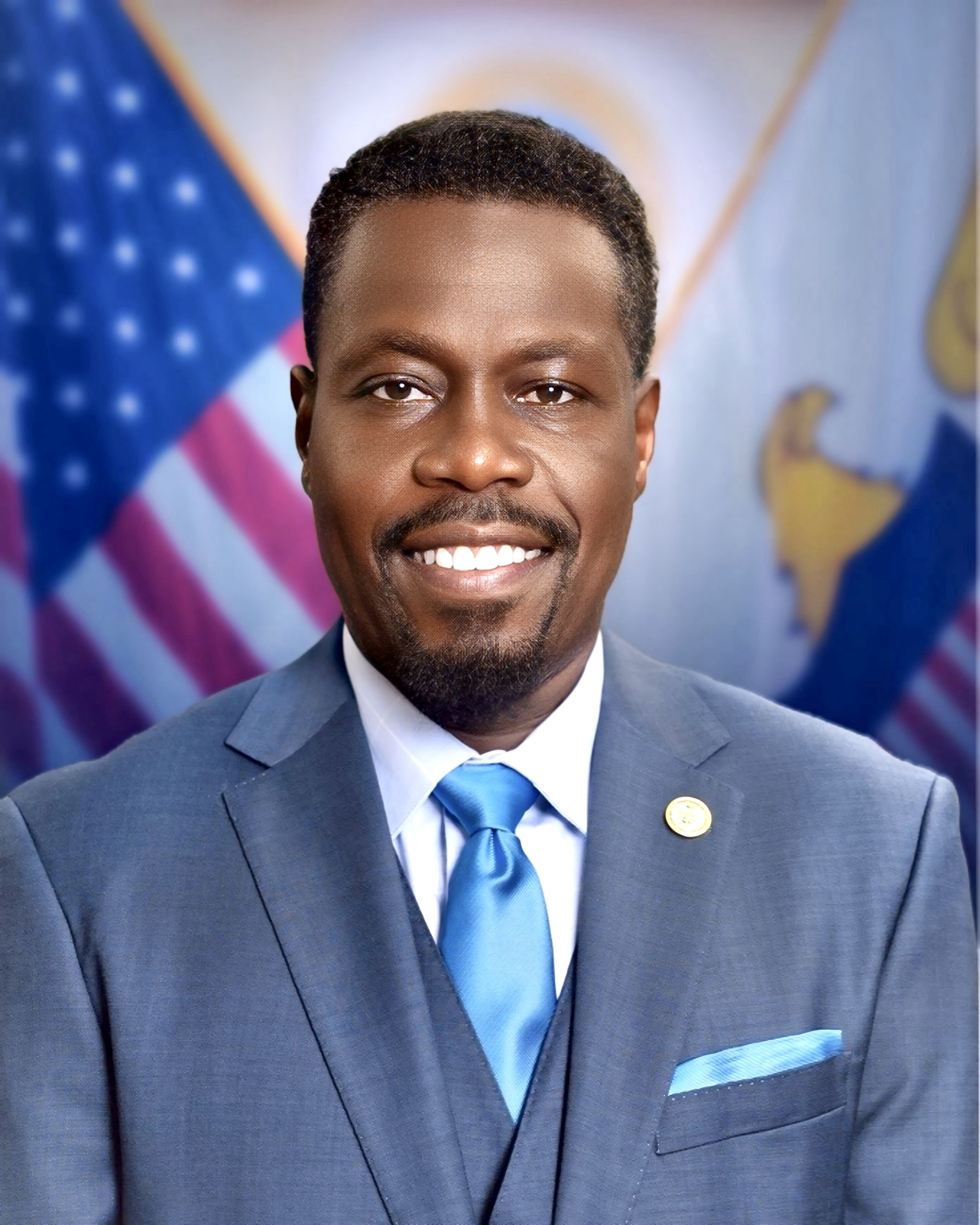

Member of the Virgin Islands Legislature from the St. Croix district
- Incumbent
- Assumed office January 13, 2025

Personal details
- Party: Democratic

Hubert L. Frederick is a U.S. Virgin Islands politician currently serving in the Virgin Islands Legislature from the St. Croix district. He currently serves as Chairman of the Committee on Economic Development and Agriculture.

In November 2024, Frederick placed fifth in the general election for the St. Croix district of the Virgin Islands Legislature, winning 3,201 votes.
