= Marise James =

United States Virgin Islands politician

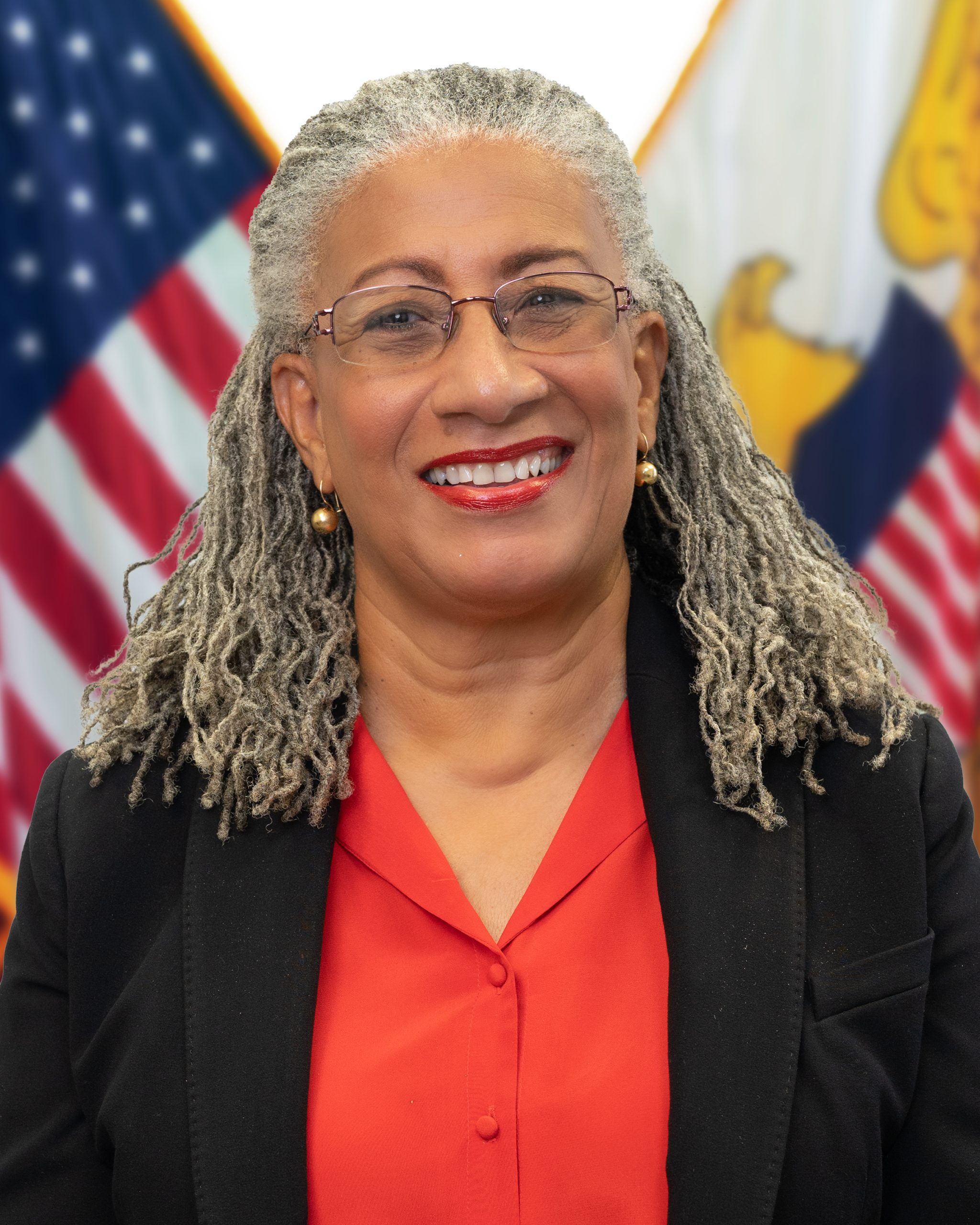

Member of the Virgin Islands Legislature from the St. Croix District
- Incumbent
- Assumed office January 9, 2023
- Preceded by: Genevieve Whitaker

Senior Policy Advisor
- In office February 2019 – November 2020
- Governor: Albert Bryan

Personal details
- Born: Christiansted, U.S. Virgin Islands
- Party: Democratic
- Spouse: Anthony Paul
- Children: 3 daughters, 2 stepsons
- Parent(s): Randall “Doc” James, Constance Espinosa
- Education: Bachelor of Arts
- Alma mater: George Washington University

Marise Cecile James is a United States Virgin Islands politician, attorney and Senator representing Saint Croix in the Legislature of the Virgin Islands, since 2023.

== Early life and career ==
James attended St. Mary's Catholic School and St. Joseph High School. After graduating from high school, James attended George Washington University, where she received a Bachelor of Arts in zoology. James represented the United States Virgin Islands in the Miss Universe 1981, where she gained the attention of director of the Division of Tourism and Department of Commerce Leona Bryan, who hired her in the Tourism division. She has worked in as a schoolteacher, attorney, and served in the Virgin Islands National Guard from 2004 to 2018, at one point working in Guantánamo Bay. She worked as Virgin Islands Governor Albert Bryan Jr.'s senior policy advisor from 2019 to 2020.

== Electoral history ==
James was first elected in the 2022 United States Virgin Islands general election. She ran for reelection in the 2024 United States Virgin Islands general election. In 2018, James ran as Angel Dawson Jr.'s running mate in the 2018 United States Virgin Islands gubernatorial election, but lost in the Democratic primaries that year. On September 9, 2025, James announced that she would not run for reelection.

== Personal life ==
James is a Roman Catholic. She is married to Anthony Paul of Trinidad and Tobago.
