= Samuel Carrion =

American Virgin Islander politician

Member of the Virgin Islands Legislature from the St. Croix district
- In office January 11, 2021 – January 13, 2025

Personal details
- Political party: Independent

Samuel Carrion is an American Virgin Islander politician. He served as an Independent member for the St. Croix district of the Virgin Islands Legislature.
