= Avery Lewis =

United States Virgin Islands politician

Member of the Virgin Islands Legislature from the St. Thomas and St. John district
- Incumbent
- Assumed office January 13, 2025
- Preceded by: Donna Frett-Gregory

Island Administrator of St. Thomas and Water Island
- In office January 2019 – May 21, 2024
- Preceded by: Merwin Potter
- Succeeded by: Kevin Rodriquez (acting)

Personal details
- Born: April 29, 1976 (age 49) Charlotte Amalie, U.S. Virgin Islands
- Party: Democratic
- Children: 1
- Education: University of the Virgin Islands (BA); Concordia University (MEd)

Avery Lewis is a U.S. Virgin Islander politician, former educator, and senator of the Legislature of the Virgin Islands, since 2025. He served as Island Administrator for St. Thomas and Water Island district from 2019 until his resignation in 2024.

== Biography ==
Lewis was born and raised on the island of St. Thomas. He is the seventh of eight children born to the late Angel Luis Lewis Sr. and Rosemarie Fleming. Lewis has family roots throughout the Caribbean in areas such as Tortola, Anguilla, Puerto Rico, Dominican Republic, and Antigua.

Lewis attended Charlotte Amalie High School, graduating in 1994. He continued his education at the University of the Virgin Islands and then at Concordia University, where he earned his M.A. in Educational Leadership.

== Professional career ==
Lewis began his professional journey as a teacher at Ulla Muller Elementary School and Joseph Sibilly Elementary School. These positions include President of the American Federation of Teachers, Local 1825, and chairman of the Virgin Islands Pension Reform Task Force.

Political offices
| Preceded by Merwin Potter | Island Administrator of St. Thomas and Water Island; 2019–2024 | Succeeded by Kevin Rodriquez; Acting |
