= United States Virgin Islands Superior Court =

Superior Court of the United States Virgin Islands
- Established: 1977
- Appeals to: Supreme Court of the United States Virgin Islands
- Number of positions: 9 judges
- Website: www.superior.vicourts.org

Presiding Judge
- Currently: Debra S. Watlington
- Since: August 1, 2022

The Virgin Islands Superior Court is the trial court of general jurisdiction for the United States Virgin Islands. The court is composed of nine judges. They are appointed by the governor and confirmed by the Legislature. Effective January 29, 2007 the Supreme Court of the Virgin Islands assumed jurisdiction over appeals from the Superior Court.

== Composition ==
The judges of the Virgin Islands Superior Court are divided among two divisions, the division of St. Croix and the division of St. Thomas/St. John. The position of presiding judge alternates every three years between the two superior court divisions to the judge with the most seniority. Judges are appointed by the governor and confirmed by the Legislature for a term of six years.

Judicial Officers of the U.S. Virgin Islands Superior Court
Title	Name	Judicial District	First term began	Current term ends	First appointed by
Judge	Harold W. L. Willocks	St. Croix	2009	2022	John P. de Jongh, Jr.
Judge	Kathleen Y. Mackay	St. Thomas/St. John	2012	2025	John P. de Jongh, Jr.
Presiding Judge	Debra S. Watlington	St. Thomas/St. John	2012	2025	John P. de Jongh, Jr.
Judge	Denise M. Francois	St. Thomas/St. John	2013	2026	John P. de Jongh, Jr.
Judge	Renee Gumbs-Carty	St. Thomas/St. John	2016	2022	Kenneth E. Mapp
Judge	Sigrid M. Tejo	St. Thomas/St. John	2021	2027	Albert Bryan
Judge	Douglas A. Brady	St. Croix	2012	2025	John P. de Jongh, Jr.
Judge	Jomo Meade	St. Croix	2016	2022	Kenneth E. Mapp
Judge	Jessica Gallivan	St. Croix	2019	2025	Albert Bryan
Judge	Alphonso G. Andrews, Jr.	St. Croix	2021	2027	Albert Bryan

== History ==
The 1921 territorial law created three Police Courts, one for St. Thomas and St. John, and two for St. Croix. The 1954 Revised Organic Act merged these into the Municipal Court of St. Thomas and St. John, and the Municipal Court of St. Croix. In 1965, these were merged into the Municipal Court of the Virgin Islands, and renamed the Territorial Court of the Virgin Islands in 1976. The court gained original jurisdiction over all local civil matters in 1991, and criminal matters in 1994; appeals were directed to the federal District Court of the Virgin Islands. When the Supreme Court of the Virgin Islands was created to accept appeals in 2004 (under a 1984 federal revision to the Revised Organic Act), the Territorial Court was renamed the Superior Court of the Virgin Islands.
