= Carla J. Joseph =

U.S. Virgin Islander politician

Member of the Virgin Islands Legislature from the St. Thomas-St. John district
- Incumbent
- Assumed office January 11, 2021

Personal details
- Born: Saint Thomas, U.S. Virgin Islands
- Party: Democratic Party of the Virgin Islands
- Education: University of the Virgin Islands (BA)

Carla J. Joseph is an American Virgin Islander politician and radio host personality. She serves as a Democratic member of the Virgin Islands Legislature, from St. Thomas-St. John district. Before serving as a Senator, Joseph worked at the Legislature of the Virgin Islands, serving under Senators Arturo Watlington, Jr. and Carol M. Burke. Joseph also previously served as the Chief of Staff of former senator George E. Goodwin. In 2014, Joseph was elected to the Virgin Islands Board of Elections, having served as the Secretary of the St. Thomas/St. John District Board and Vice-Chair of the Joint Board. Joseph holds a Bachelors of Arts in Humanities and holds a certification as a public manager from the University of the Virgin Islands.
