= Angel Bolques Jr. =

American Virgin Islander politician

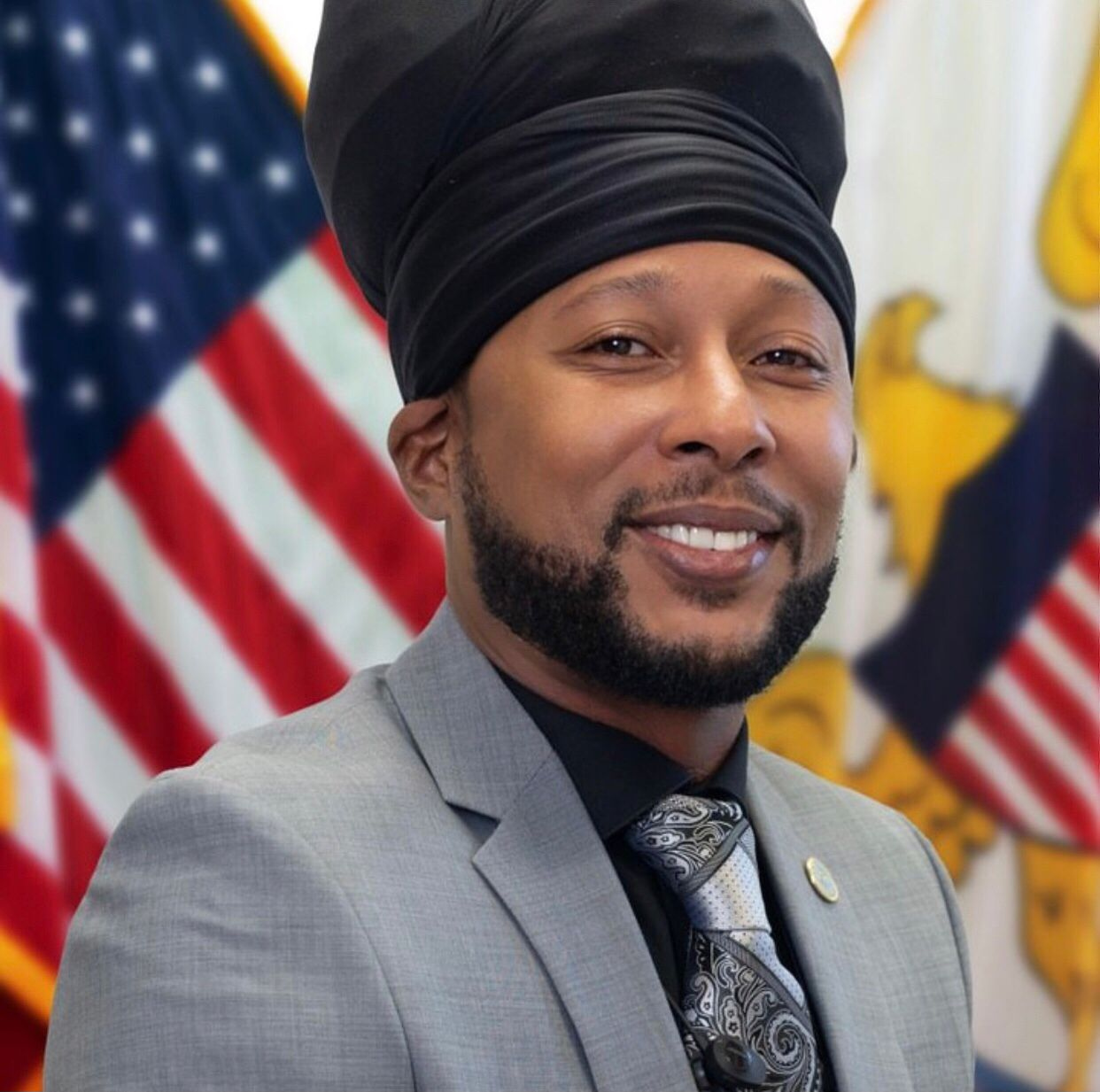
- Bolques in 2022

Member of the Virgin Islands Legislature from the at-large district
- Incumbent
- Assumed office July 25, 2022
- Preceded by: Steven Payne Sr.

Personal details
- Born: February 2, 1978 (age 48) Saint Croix, U.S. Virgin Islands
- Party: Democratic
- Spouse: Melisa Bolques
- Children: Faith Angelique Bolques, Cameron Bolques, Angel Bolques III, Ajahnai Bolques
- Website: www.angelbolquesjr.com

Angel Bolques Jr. is an American Virgin Islander politician. He serves as a Democratic member for the at-large district of the Virgin Islands Legislature.
