= Clifford A. Joseph =

American Virgin Islander politician

Member of the Virgin Islands Legislature from the St. Croix district
- Incumbent
- Assumed office January 13, 2025

Personal details
- Born: February 24, 1969 (age 57) St. Croix, United States Virgin Islands
- Party: Democratic

Clifford A. Joseph, Sr. is a U.S. Virgin Islands politician currently serving in the Virgin Islands Legislature from the St. Croix district. Before serving as a senator, Joseph served as Fire Marshall at the Virgin Islands Fire Service from 2012 to 2015. Joseph later served as Director of the Virgin Islands Fire Service.
