= Ray Fonseca (politician) =

United States Virgin Islands politician

Member of the Virgin Islands Legislature from the St. Thomas-St. John district
- Incumbent
- Assumed office January 9, 2023
- Preceded by: Janelle K. Sarauw

Personal details
- Born: March 10, 1959 (age 67) St. Thomas, U.S. Virgin Islands
- Party: Democratic
- Children: 4
- Education: Florida State University; University of the Virgin Islands

Ray Fonseca (born March 10, 1959) is a U.S. Virgin Islands politician and senator serving in the Legislature of the Virgin Islands from the St. Thomas-St. John District, since 2023.

== Early life and education ==
Fonseca was born in the Savan neighborhood of Charlotte Amalie. The son of David Fonseca from Dominican Republic and Linelle Bodman-Williams Fonseca from Tortola. Fonseca grew up in the Bovoni community on St. Thomas. He attended public school in the U.S. Virgin Islands where he graduated from the Ivanna Eudora Kean High School in 1976. Fonseca received his BA degree in Hotel Management and Accounting at Florida State University in 1980. He later went on to the University of the Virgin Islands, where he obtained a master's degree in Business Administration in 1987.

== Career ==
In 1985, Fonseca began working for the Virgin Islands Housing Authority as an Assistant Accounting Supervisor. He was promoted to the position of CEO at the housing agency. Fonseca then transitioned to Department of Health and became a Chief of Staff to the Commissioner.
