= Dwayne M. DeGraff =

American Virgin Islander politician

Dwayne DeGraff

Minority Leader of the Virgin Islands Legislature
- Incumbent
- Assumed office January 9, 2023

Member of the Virgin Islands Legislature from the St. Thomas-St. John district
- Incumbent
- Assumed office January 9, 2017

Personal details
- Born: Dwayne Maurice DeGraff; 1961 (age 64–65)
- Party: Independent
- Education: University of the Virgin Islands (attended)

Dwayne Maurice DeGraff (born 1961) is an American Virgin Islander politician. He serves as an Independent member for the St. Thomas-St. John district of the Virgin Islands Legislature. He attended the University of the Virgin Islands.
