= Legislature of the Virgin Islands =

Territorial legislature of the United States Virgin Islands

Legislature of the United States Virgin Islands
- 36th Legislature

Type
- Type: Unicameral

Leadership
- President: Milton E. Potter (D) since January 13, 2025
- Vice President: Kenneth Gittens (D) since January 13, 2025
- Majority Leader: Kurt Vialet (D) since January 13, 2025
- Minority Leader: Dwayne M. DeGraff (I) since January 9, 2023

Structure
- Seats: 15
- Political groups: Majority: Democratic (12); Minority: Independent (3)
- Length of term: 2 years (no term limits)
- Authority: Organic Act of the Virgin Islands
- Salary: $85,000

Elections
- Voting system: Plurality-at-large voting
- Last election: November 3, 2026
- Next election: November 7, 2028

Meeting place
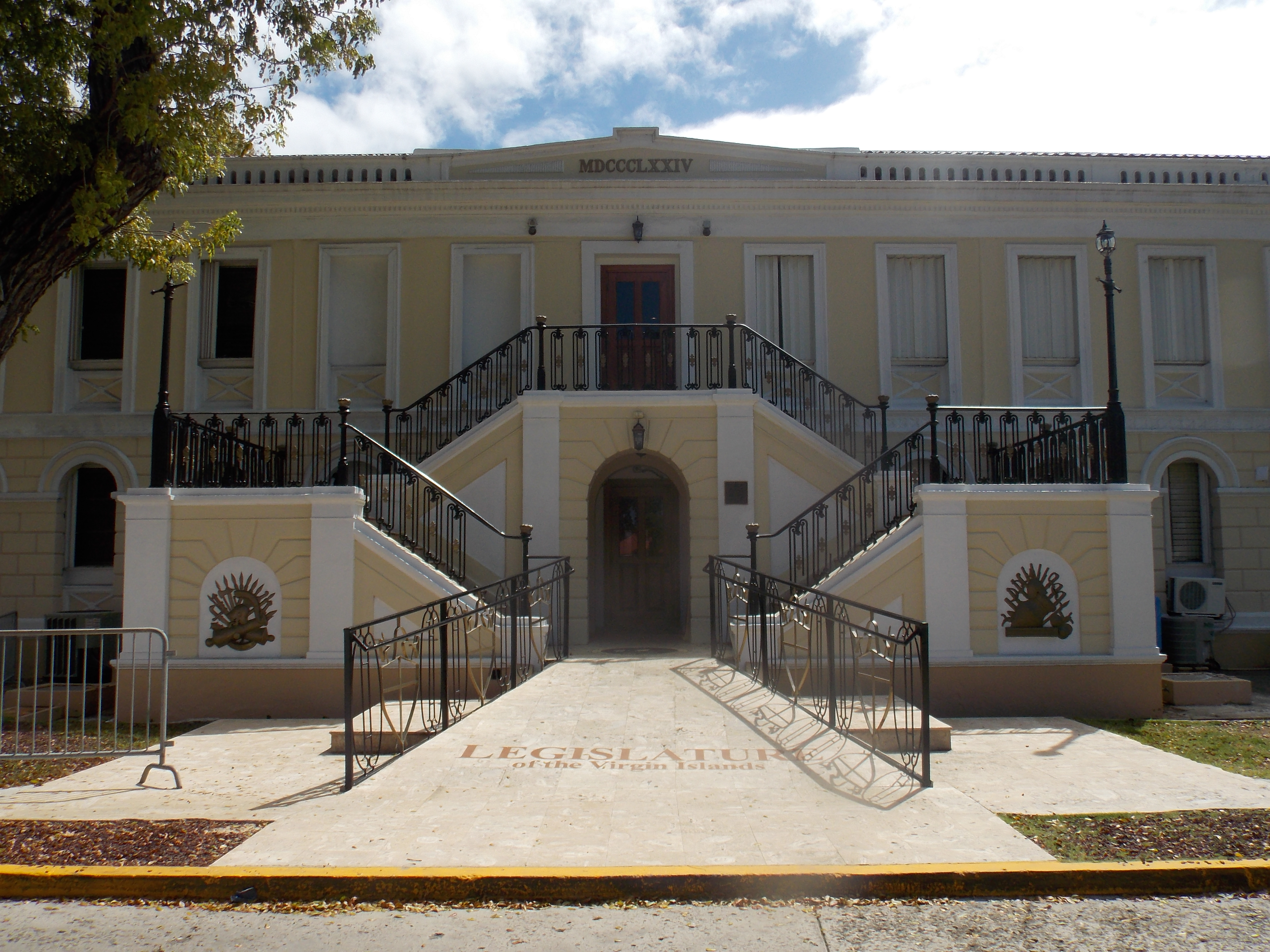
- The Legislature Building, Charlotte Amalie

Website
- legvi.org

The Legislature of the United States Virgin Islands is the territorial legislature of the United States Virgin Islands. The legislative branch of the unincorporated U.S. territory is unicameral, with a single house consisting of 15 senators, elected to two-year terms without term limits. The legislature meets in Charlotte Amalie on the island of St. Thomas.

== History ==
=== The Danish period: 1852–1917 ===
The roots of the modern legislature date to the passage of the Colonial Law in 1852 during the Danish colonial period. The law created a Colonial Assembly for the Danish West Indies, as well as the appointment of a vice-regent serving as the colony's governor executive, serving on behalf of the King of Denmark. Despite the name, the Colonial Assembly acted more as an advisory body than a true legislature. Vice-regents continued to reserve the right to reject or amend any law they did not see fit.

A further Colonial Law coming in 1863 broke the Assembly into two parts, creating a colonial council for the newly created St. Thomas and St. John Municipality, and a separate colonial council for the St. Croix Municipality. The 1863 law provided the councils to combine into a single legislature when called upon by the Vice-regent or by legislators themselves, and gave legislators greater say in the colony's finances. However, the Danish monarch still reserved the right to pick several members of the councils, giving Copenhagen a continued say in the colony's legislative affairs. The monarch-appointed vice-regent and the king also continued to reserve the right to pass or deny any colonial bills brought upon their desks. The voting franchise of this period remained low, hovering just under six percent.

=== The American period: 1917–present ===
Upon the U.S. purchase of the islands from Denmark in 1917 by fears of German expansion into the Caribbean, the renamed U.S. Virgin Islands government underwent a gradual overhaul. From 1917 to 1931, the U.S. Navy administered the islands, with a Navy officer serving gubernatorial duties, while the colonial councils for the territory's two municipalities created by the Danes fifty years earlier remained with little change. Islanders were granted American citizenship in 1927, and after popular discontent with incompetent naval rule, the islands came under the supervision of the federal Department of the Interior in 1931.

The U.S. Congress's passage of the 1936 Organic Act brought the greatest amount of self-government the islands had ever known. For the first time, all islanders above the age of 21 enjoyed universal suffrage. The colonial councils—now municipal councils—could combine when desired to form a Legislative Assembly. The Legislative Assembly now could override gubernatorial vetoes with a two-thirds majority, a parliamentary procedure endowed to the U.S. Congress and various state legislatures. The federal Congress and President, however, continued to reserve the right to veto territorial legislation.

=== Modern legislature ===
The Revised Organic Act of the Virgin Islands of 1954 dissolved the two Municipal Councils, creating a permanent unified and unicameral Legislature of the Virgin Islands. A revision in the territory's constitution in 1966 increased the number of legislators from its original amount of 11 to 15.

Today, the Legislature of the Virgin Islands is a territorial legislative body with the same rights and powers comparable to that of many state legislatures within the United States.

=== Legislature Building ===
The senate's home is the Legislature Building, a historic building built in 1828 as Danish police barracks, modified extensively in 1884, which is included in the Charlotte Amalie Historic District.

== Legislature ==
The legislature, referred to as the Senate, is a unicameral body, one of the four such legislative bodies in the United States, along with Nebraska, Guam and the District of Columbia. The legislature meets inside the Senate Building in Charlotte Amalie, a restored Danish and American military barracks building as well as a former high school.

It is composed of 15 senators, each serving two-year terms. The territory is divided into two multimember constituencies, with seven senators representing each, elected by block voting, while a single senator from St. John is elected at large.

Qualifications to be a senator include being at least 21 years of age, a U.S. citizen, a resident of the Virgin Islands for three years, and a qualified resident of their representing district.

=== Current composition ===
	Party (Shading indicates majority/plurality)			Total
	Democratic	Independent Citizens	Independent	Total
End of previous Legislature	11	0	4	15
Begin (January 13, 2025)	12	0	3	15
Latest voting share	80%	0%	20%	100%

=== Members ===
District	Name	Party	Start
At-large	Angel Bolques Jr.	Democratic	2022
St. Croix	Franklin D. Johnson	Independent	2021
St. Croix	Hubert L. Frederick	Democratic	2025
St. Croix	Clifford A. Joseph	Democratic	2025
St. Croix	Kenneth Gittens	Democratic	2019 (Note: Gittens was previously a member from 2013 to 2017.)
St. Croix	Marise James	Democratic	2023
St. Croix	Novelle Francis	Democratic	2015
St. Croix	Kurt Vialet	Democratic	2025 (Note: Vialet was previously a member from 2015 to 2023.)
St. Thomas/ St. John	Alma Francis-Heyliger	Independent	2021
St. Thomas/ St. John	Carla J. Joseph	Democratic	2021
St. Thomas/ St. John	Avery L. Lewis	Democratic	2025
St. Thomas/ St. John	Dwayne M. DeGraff	Independent	2017
St. Thomas/ St. John	Ray Fonseca	Democratic	2023
St. Thomas/ St. John	Marvin Blyden	Democratic	2015
St. Thomas/ St. John	Milton E. Potter	Democratic	2021

== Past composition of the Legislature ==
- 34th Virgin Islands Legislature (2021)
- 31st Virgin Islands Legislature (2015)
- 28th Virgin Islands Legislature (2009)

== See also ==
- List of state and territorial capitols in the United States
- List of Virgin Islands Legislatures
