= 2026 in the United States Virgin Islands =

- Decades: 2000s; 2010s; 2020s
- See also: History of the United States Virgin Islands; Outline of the United States Virgin Islands; List of years in the United States Virgin Islands; 2026 in the United States

Events in the year 2026 in the United States Virgin Islands.

== Incumbents ==
- Governor: Albert Bryan Jr. (D)
- House Delegate: Stacey Plaskett (D)

== Events ==
- January 8 – A woman from Detroit Lakes, Minnesota dies after losing her arm in a shark attack at a Frederiksted Southeast beach.
- January 19 – Three men are shot to death at a dumpsite in St. Croix.
- May 31 – A total blackout strikes St. Thomas and St. John.
- July 20 – The Trump administration suspends funding for the Virgin Islands Housing Authority, accusing it of corruption and mismanagement of funds granted to help the Virgin Islands recover from Hurricane Irma and Hurricane Maria.
- July 24 – Eustace Charles, a Virgin Islands Police officer assigned to Governor Bryan's security detail, is killed by multiple gunmen outside his home.
- August 21 – The federal government declares a drought disaster in the U.S. Virgin Islands.
- October 28 – The offices of Governor Albert Bryan and Delegate Stacey Plaskett issue statements condemning a recent video showing two people physically assaulting a gay teenager.
- November 3 – 2026 United States House of Representatives election in the United States Virgin Islands: Janelle Sarauw wins the election.
