= 2020 United States Virgin Islands constitutional convention referendum =

3 November 2020
- Are you in favor of the Legislature enacting legislation to convene a constitutional convention to adapt the Revised Organic Act of the Virgin Islands, 68 Stat. 497, or portions of it as the Constitution of the Virgin Islands?

Results
Choice	Votes	%
Yes	7,275	71.92%
No	2,840	28.08%
Valid votes	10,115	55.79%
Invalid or blank votes	8,015	44.21%
Total votes	18,130	100.00%
Registered voters/turnout	53,341	33.99%

A referendum on holding a constitutional convention was held in the US Virgin Islands on 3 November 2020 alongside general elections. 72% of voters responding to the referendum question voted in favor and turnout was above the 50% threshold required.

== Background ==
The islands' first constitutional convention was held from 1964 to 1965 after members were elected in 1964. Although the convention approved a draft constitution in February 1965, it was not adopted by the United States Congress, although some elements became law. A second convention was held in 1971–1972, and although the draft constitution was approved by a majority of voters in a 1972 referendum, VI delegate Ron de Lugo believed the low turnout meant the constitution did not have sufficient mandate from the people and did not take it to Congress.

The third constitution convention was held between 1977 and 1978, but this time voters rejected the draft document in a 1979 referendum. A fourth convention was held in 1980, with the draft again rejected by voters in a 1981 referendum. The fifth convention was held in 2009, but failed to agree on a draft by 2012 and was dissolved.

On 7 May 2020 the Legislature passed law 8308, which proposed a non-binding referendum on electing a constitutional convention. Governor Albert Bryan signed the law the following day. In order for the convention to be called at the Legislature's option, at least 50% of voters participating in the general election had to answer the referendum question, and a majority of those answering it had to vote in favor.

== Results ==
A total of 18,130 voters participated in the general election, of which 10,115 (56%) answered the referendum question. With a majority of those voting also voting in favor, the proposal was approved.

Choice	Votes	%
For	7,275	71.92
Against	2,840	28.08
Blank votes	8,015	-
Total	18,130	100
Registered voters/turnout	53,341	33.99
Source: VI Vote, Direct Democracy

== Aftermath ==
A bill on the calling of the sixth constitutional convention was approved on 29 December 2022, with members of the convention to be elected on 5 November 2024 during election day. The convention is planned to open in January 2025 and prepare a new constitution by 31 October 2025, followed by a referendum on it on 3 November 2026. If approved, the new constitution will enter into force on 31 March 2027.
