= Catherineberg Sugar Mill Ruins =

- Catherineberg-Jockumsdahl-Herman Farm
- U.S. National Register of Historic Places
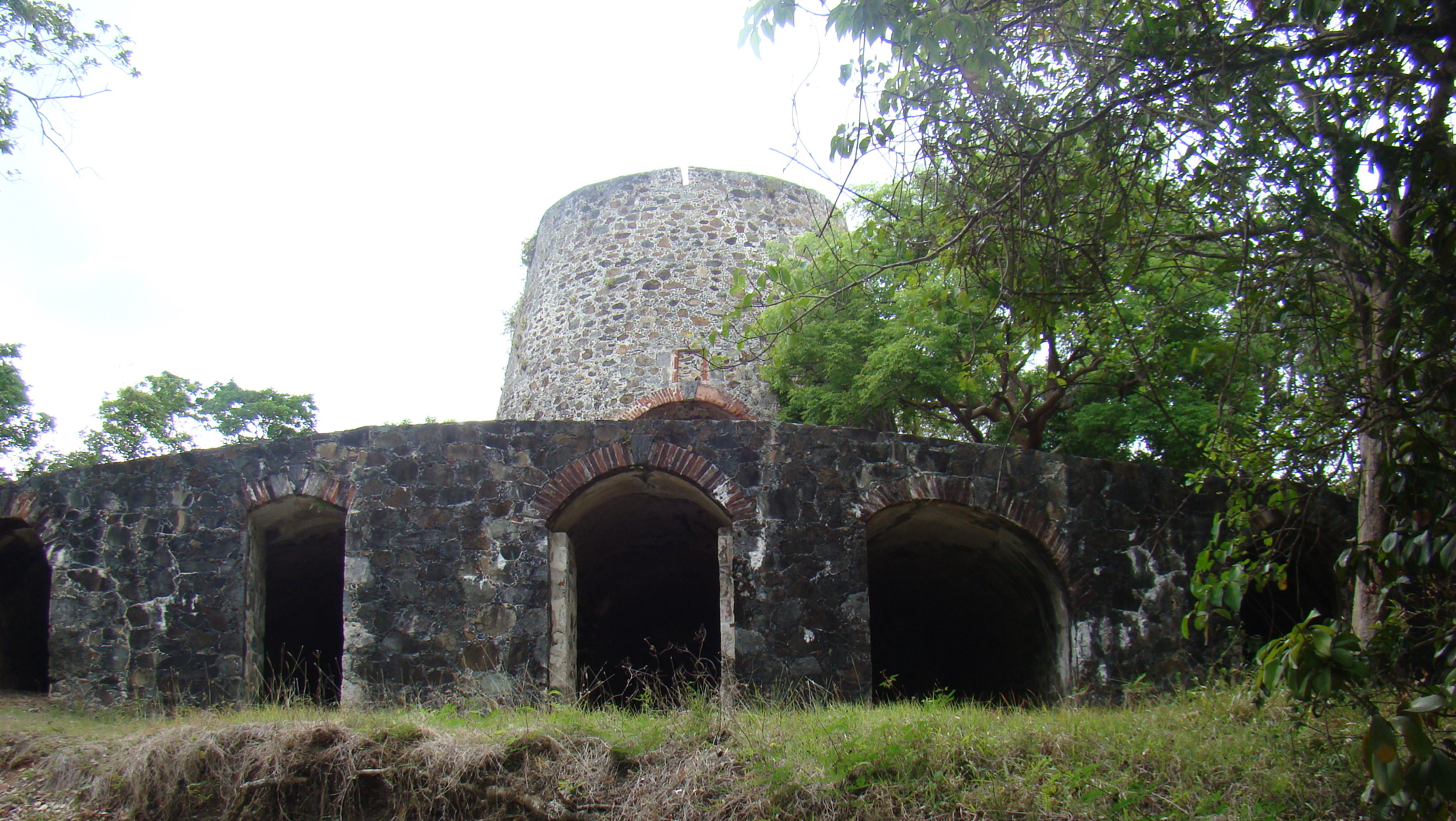
- Catherineberg Sugar Mill Ruins

- Location within the U.S. Virgin Islands
- Nearest city: Cruz Bay, U.S. Virgin Islands
- Coordinates: 18°20′48″N 64°45′41″W
- Area: 15 acres (6.1 ha)
- MPS: Virgin Islands National Park MRA
- NRHP reference No.: 78000270
- Added to NRHP: March 30, 1978

Catherineberg Sugar Mill Ruins is an historic site located in the Virgin Islands National Park, east of Cruz Bay on Saint John, U.S. Virgin Islands. The ruins are an example of an 18th-century sugar and rum factory.

To reach Catherineberg, turn north on John Head Road from Centerline Road. There is room for several cars to park right next to the windmill.

The "most impressive" ruin is that of an unusual windmill tower.

== History ==
A sugar plantation from the 18th to the 19th centuries, the farm eventually became land for grazing cattle.

In 1733 one of the first significant slave rebellions in the New World took place on Saint John when African slaves took over the island for six months. During the slave revolt, the farm was the headquarters of the Amina warriors.

Today the sugar mill ruins are located in a protected area in the Virgin Islands National Park. It is one of 17 properties in the park that were listed on the U.S. National Register of Historic Places by 1981. The property was added to the U.S. National Register of Historic Places on March 30, 1978.

== Architecture ==
Catherineberg Sugar Mill Ruins are an example of an 18th-century sugar and rum factory. The documented ruins on the site are the windmill, a still, a factory, a horse mill, a stable and oxpound, and two unidentified structures.

== Gallery ==
Scenes around the Catherineberg Sugar Mill Site:

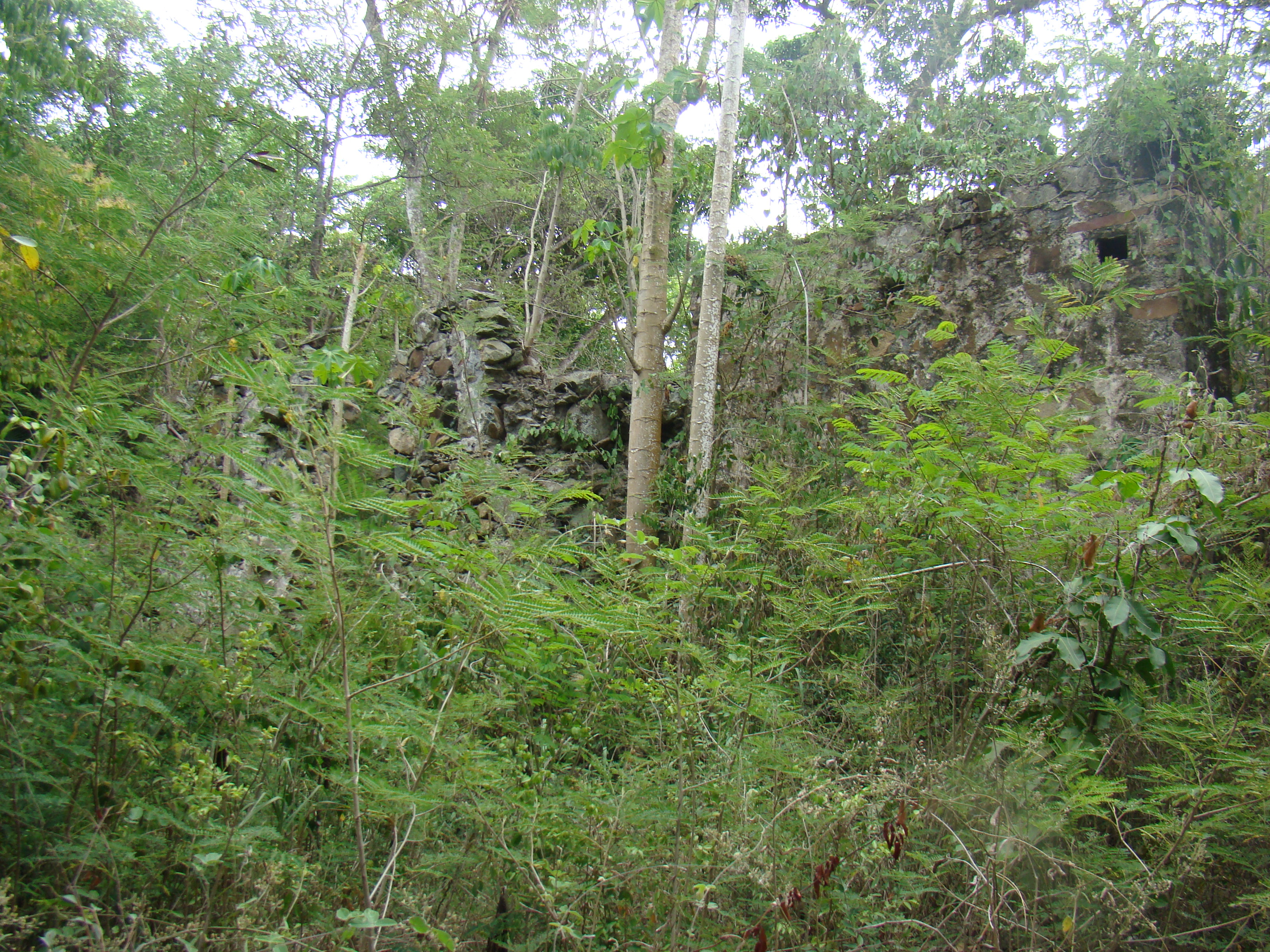
Ruins, overgrown, unrestored area

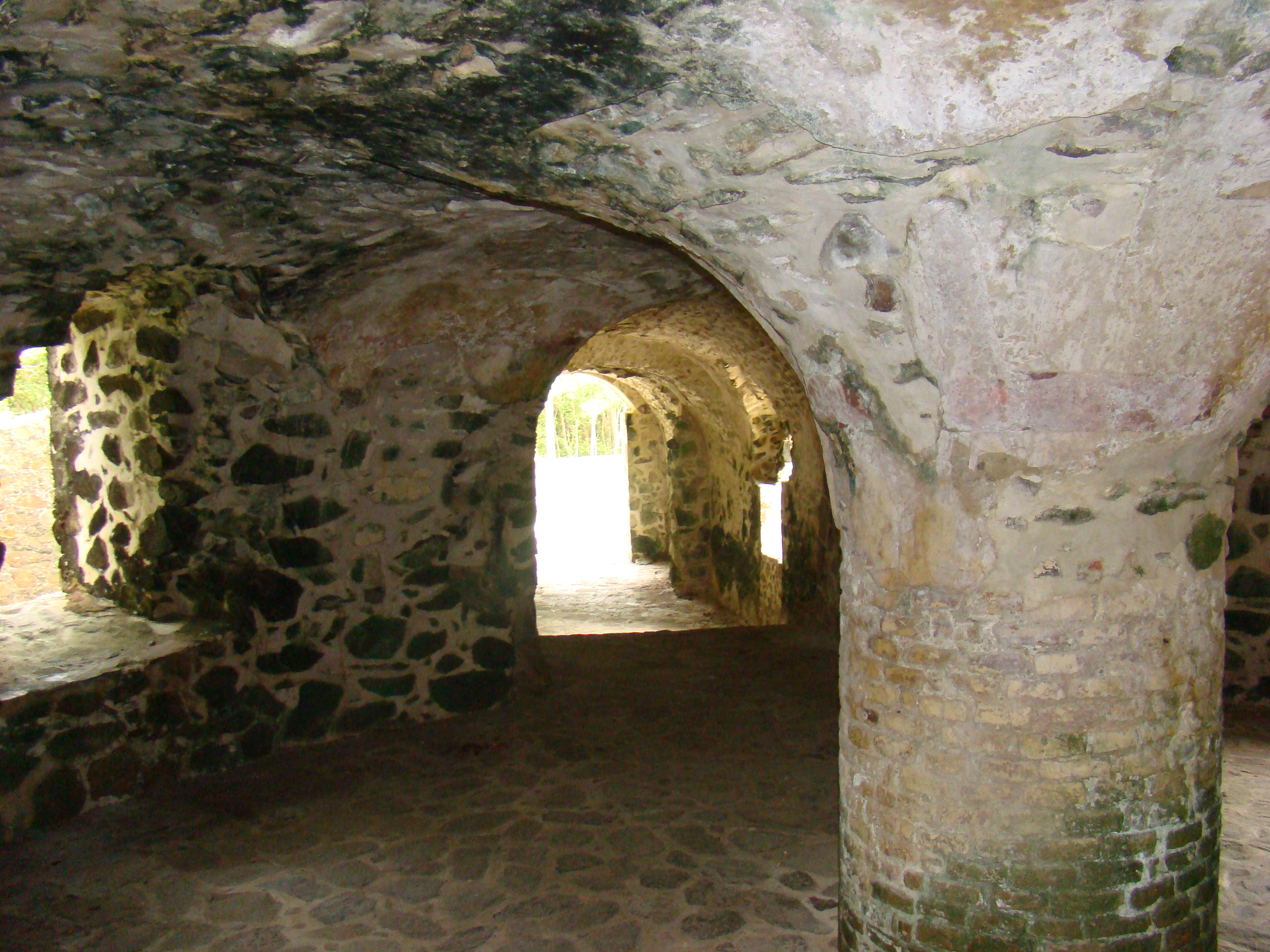
Interior view of including column details

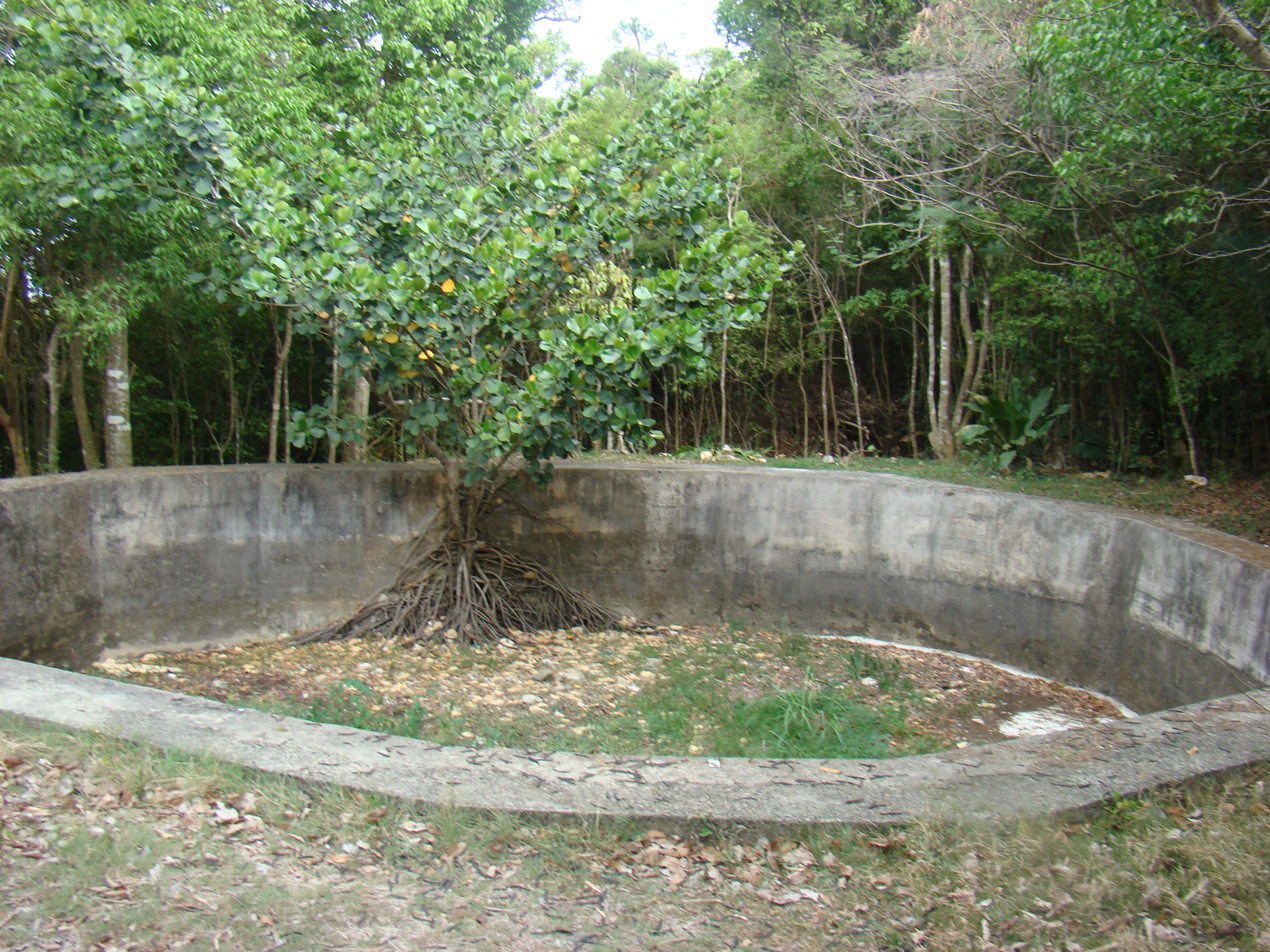
Storage vault

== See also ==
- Estate Catherineberg
- Sugar production in the Danish West Indies
- Danish West Indies topics
