= 2023 in the United States Virgin Islands =

- Decades: 2000s; 2010s; 2020s
- See also: History of the United States Virgin Islands; Outline of the United States Virgin Islands; List of years in the United States Virgin Islands; 2023 in the United States

Events in the year 2023 in the United States Virgin Islands.

== Incumbents ==
- President: Joe Biden (D)
- Governor: Albert Bryan Jr. (D)

== Sports ==
- 2022–23 U.S. Virgin Islands Association Club Championship
- Virgin Islands at the 2023 Parapan American Games
- 2023 Paradise Jam

== Holidays ==
- 1 January - New Year's Day
- 6 January - Epiphany
- 15 January - Martin Luther King Jr. Day
- 19 February – Presidents' Day
- 23 March - Emancipation Day
- 29 March – Good Friday
- 27 May – Memorial Day
- 4 July – Independence Day
- 2 September – Labor Day
- 14 October – Columbus Day
- 11 November – Veterans Day
- 17 November – Discovery Day
- 28 November – Thanksgiving Day
- 25 December – Christmas Day

== See also ==
- 2023 in the United States
- 2023 Atlantic hurricane season
- 2023 in the Caribbean
