= 2021 in the United States Virgin Islands =

- Decades: 2000s; 2010s; 2020s
- See also: History of the United States Virgin Islands; Outline of the United States Virgin Islands; List of years in the United States Virgin Islands; 2021 in the United States

Events in the year 2021 in the United States Virgin Islands.

== Incumbents ==
- President: Donald Trump (until 20 January); Joe Biden (D) onwards
- Governor: Albert Bryan Jr. (D)

== Events ==
Ongoing: COVID-19 pandemic in the United States Virgin Islands

- 8 March – Disappearance of Sarm Heslop

== Sports ==
- 2021 Paradise Jam
- Virgin Islands at the 2020 Summer Olympics

== Holidays ==
- 1 January – New Year's Day
- 6 January – Epiphany
- 15 January – Martin Luther King Jr. Day
- 19 February – Presidents' Day
- 23 March – Emancipation Day
- 29 March – Good Friday
- 27 May – Memorial Day
- 4 July – Independence Day
- 2 September – Labor Day
- 14 October – Columbus Day
- 11 November – Veterans Day
- 17 November – Discovery Day
- 28 November – Thanksgiving Day
- 25 December – Christmas Day

== See also ==
- 2021 in the United States
- 2021 Atlantic hurricane season
- 2021 in the Caribbean
