= History of the Virgin Islands =

The term history of the Virgin Islands could refer to:

- the history of the British Virgin Islands
- the history of the U.S. Virgin Islands
