= Estate Catherineberg =

Coordinates: 18°20′38″N 64°56′00″W

Estate Catherineberg is a historic mansion on Denmark Hill in Charlotte Amalie, on Saint Thomas island, in the territory of the United States Virgin Islands.

It is owned by the Virgin Islands territorial government and previously served as a residence for the governor of the U.S. Virgin Islands. The last governor to reside there was Charles Turnbull. After several years of vacancy, the territory's government announced in 2017 that the historic building would be opened to the public as a museum.

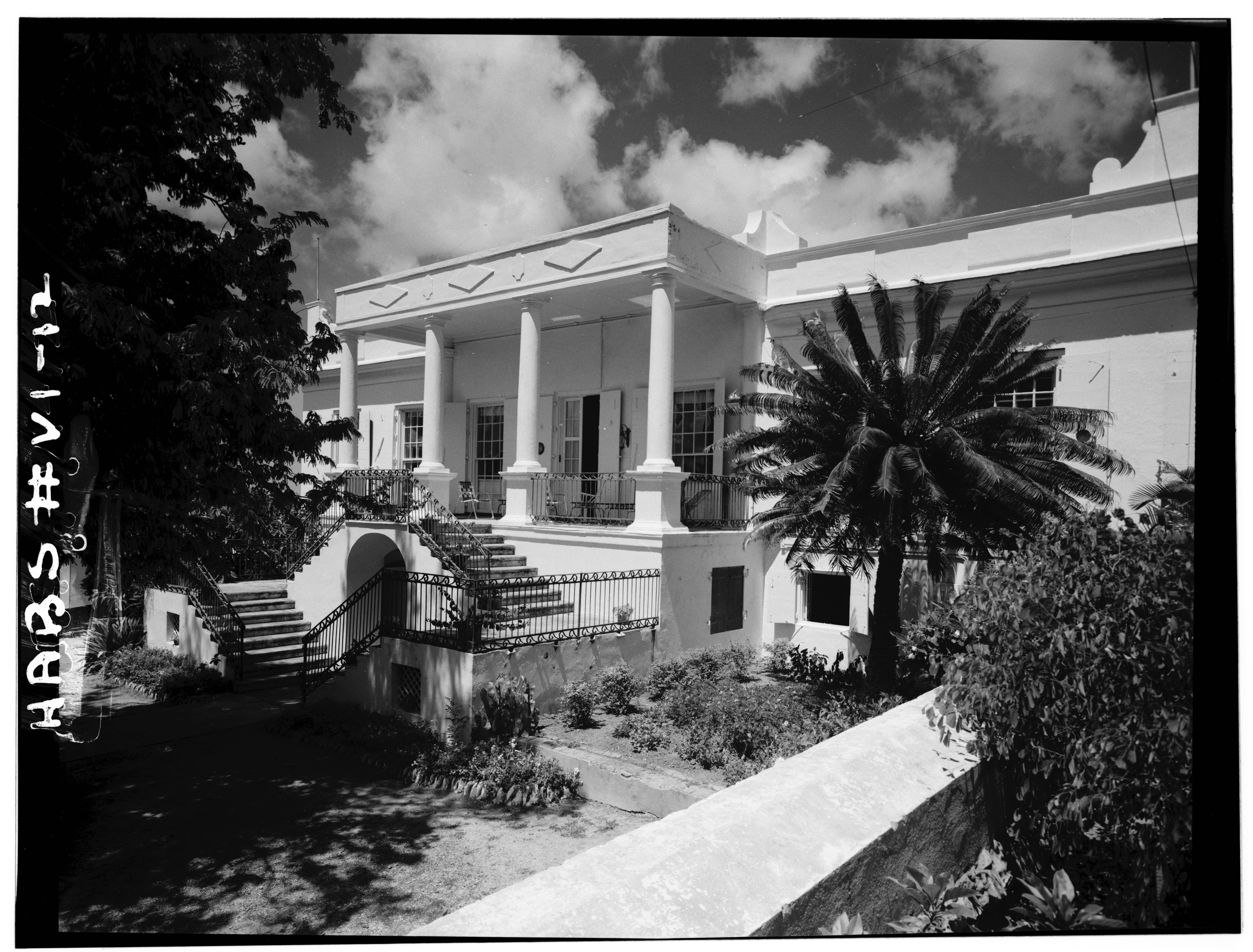
Catharineberg, Estate No. 8, Store Nordside Quarter, Charlotte Amalie, St. Thomas, VI HABS VI,3-CHAM,5-1

== History ==
Estate Catherineberg Plantation

It was the Danish colonial plantation house of the Estate Catherineberg plantation during the Danish West Indies period. The plantation grew sugarcane and processed it in the Catherineberg Sugar Mill complex on the estate. Estate Catherineberg was part of the Danish West Indies sugar industry.

== See also ==
- Mafolie Great House
- Catherineberg Sugar Mill Ruins
- Sugar production in the Danish West Indies
