= 1981 United States Virgin Islands constitutional referendum =

Ballot measure in the US Virgin Islands

3 November 1981

Results
Choice	Votes	%
Yes	4,821	40.25%
No	7,157	59.75%
Valid votes	11,978	100.00%
Invalid or blank votes	0	0.00%
Total votes	11,978	100.00%
Registered voters/turnout	25,485	47%

A constitutional referendum was held in the United States Virgin Islands on 3 November 1981. The 30-member Constitutional Council was elected in 1980. The Council drew up and then adopted a draft constitution, but as with previous attempts in 1972 and 1979, the draft constitution was rejected by the voters.

== Results ==
Choice	Votes	%
For	4,821	40.25
Against	7,157	59.75
Invalid votes		–
Total	11,978	100
Registered voters/turnout	25,485	47.00
Source: Direct Democracy
