= 1977 United States Virgin Islands Constitutional Convention election =

A Constitutional Convention election was held in the United States Virgin Islands on 14 June 1977.

The Constitutional Council wrote and then unanimously adopted a draft constitution which provided for an elected governor and treasurer, a 17-seat Legislature, a local justice system and protections for Virgin Islander culture.

The draft constitution was rejected by the voters in the referendum in 1979.

== Results ==
St. Thomas/St. John
Candidate	Votes	%
Alexander A. Farrelly	2,041	3.38
Michael Paiewonsky	1,664	2.76
Elmo D. Roebuck	1,647	2.73
Mario A. Watlington	1,620	2.68
John L. Maduro	1,415	2.34
Theovald E. Moorhead	1,410	2.33
Hugo Dennis Jr.	1,397	2.31
Gilbert A. Sprauve	1,386	2.29
Charles W. Turnbull	1,379	2.28
Lloyd L. Williams	1,356	2.25
Edith Quetel Bryan	1,241	2.05
Wilbur La Motta	1,241	2.05
Lucien Alanzo Moolenaar II	1,213	2.01
Geraldo Guirty	1,198	1.98
Roger C. Hill	1,174	1.94
Thyra Hodge Smith	1,165	1.93
Clarice A. Bryan	1,164	1.93
Mavis H. Brady	1,113	1.84
Alphonso A. Christian	1,091	1.81
Rudolph Krigger	1,048	1.74
Gerald E. Hodge Sr.	1,018	1.69
Ernest Schulterbrandt	1,008	1.67
Alfred H. Lockhart	1,006	1.67
Annie Callwood	999	1.65
Darwin D. Creque	996	1.65
Elma Davis Smith	987	1.63
Robert Moss	959	1.59
Vincen M. Clendinen	928	1.54
Ruby Simmonds	923	1.53
Louis J. Boschulte	903	1.50
Ive A. Swan	855	1.42
Catherine S. Farrelly	821	1.36
Fred Vialet Jr.	818	1.35
Florence C. Hill	803	1.33
John P. Collins	766	1.27
Stedmann Hodge	750	1.24
Samuel B. King	745	1.23
Zeathea E. Armstrong	740	1.23
Toya Andrew	733	1.21
Andre Ottley	733	1.21
Edward A. Phillips	696	1.15
Thomas W. Gibbs III	684	1.13
Flavius A. Ottley	674	1.12
Daniel W. Ambrose	621	1.03
Conrad Clark	608	1.01
Louis A. Holder Sr.	579	0.96
Ali J. Paul	565	0.94
Tom Lawrence	549	0.91
Jim Samuels	527	0.87
Neville La Borde	521	0.86
Barbara de Jongh Malo	504	0.83
John V. Watley	503	0.83
Leandre V. Roberts	491	0.81
Renaa Rhymer	491	0.81
Frank McLaughlin Jr.	476	0.79
Carmelo "Tito" Morales	469	0.78
Mary C. Holter	447	0.74
Eudelta Joseph	440	0.73
Constantinos Coulianos	435	0.72
Ray K. Joseph	434	0.72
Felecia Adams Brownlow	415	0.69
Glen J. Smith	399	0.66
Cletis Clendinen Sr.	394	0.65
Lucia C. Woods	391	0.65
Alvin Newton	336	0.56
Hector R. Francis	335	0.55
Louise Larcheveaux Ali	289	0.48
Miguel S. Farrington	265	0.44
Leonard Normil Sr.	256	0.42
David J. O'Connell	244	0.40
K. C. Jones	235	0.39
Gregory Kirchoff	218	0.36
John A. Richards Jr.	196	0.32
Vincent A. Rivera	183	0.30
James P. Goss	174	0.29
James J. Meehan	165	0.27
Douglas R. Gardner	137	0.23
Harthy Brothers	130	0.22
Charles Alphonso Bell	115	0.19
John J. Donnelly	105	0.17
Donald E. Stephens	102	0.17
Myrtle Edwards	79	0.13
Worthington G. Tyler	65	0.11
Total	60,396	100.00

St. Croix
Candidate	Votes	%
Sidney Lee	1,800	3.19
Alva C. McFarlane	1,748	3.10
Anrold M. Golden	1,743	3.09
Juan Luis	1,734	3.07
Ann E. Abramson	1,572	2.78
Williams S. Harvey	1,543	2.73
Jessica Tutein Moolenaar	1,406	2.49
Wilfrid A. James	1,383	2.45
Henry E. Rohlsen	1,357	2.40
Edgar M. Iles	1,325	2.35
Rupert W. Ross Jr.	1,297	2.30
Bent Lawaetz	1,172	2.08
Walter I. M. Hodge	1,099	1.95
Eulalie C. Rivera	1,081	1.91
Hilda B. England	1,075	1.90
James O'Neal Henderson	1,068	1.89
George G. O'Reilly	1,056	1.87
Adelbert Bryan	1,052	1.86
Clifford A. Christian	1,043	1.85
James H. Isherwood	1,018	1.80
Clemente Cintron Jr.	1,017	1.80
Juan Garcia Jr.	998	1.77
Leona B. Watson	893	1.58
Douglas D. Nesbitt	870	1.54
Edgar Mullgrav	859	1.52
Oran Roebuck	858	1.52
Octave "Snacky" David	850	1.51
Randall N. James	845	1.50
Wallace W. Phaire	836	1.48
Adelbert Anduze	805	1.43
Robert P. Cramer	794	1.41
Clarence A. Molloy Jr.	780	1.38
Joseph J. Christian	722	1.28
Felix I. Pitterson	694	1.23
Max Jacobs	691	1.22
Denise G. Richards	666	1.18
Priscilla Watkins	651	1.15
Teofilo Rivera Almestica	650	1.15
Lawrence A. Bastian	619	1.10
Yvonne Lang Lombardi	584	1.03
Alan J. Bronstein	517	0.92
Robert Bidelspacher	501	0.89
Victor C. Gomez	490	0.87
Annette F. Hendricks	487	0.86
Juanita Espinosa	474	0.84
Ira Jacobs Jr.	473	0.84
Leslie Chenet	467	0.83
Anastasia D. Armstrong	391	0.69
Jose de Diego Encarnacion	385	0.68
Teofilo Espinosa	385	0.68
Eric W. Stanley	384	0.68
Evelyn N. Cooper Whitney	366	0.65
Marion J. Christian	350	0.62
Lawrence J. C. Salter	340	0.60
Roy D. Roberts	329	0.58
Wilhelmine Marsh	325	0.58
Jaime Perez	322	0.57
Carmelo Velazquez	315	0.56
Wilfred Benjamin	303	0.54
William T. Holmes	300	0.53
Frank Prince	294	0.52
Delita M. W. Jacobs	294	0.52
John J. Sullivan	278	0.49
Helvia G. Encarnacion	277	0.49
Helen Joseph	262	0.46
Gregory E. Willocks	245	0.43
Cipriani Phillip	239	0.42
Alvin E. Claxton	231	0.41
David W. Thomson	230	0.41
Faith Dane Johnson	229	0.41
Ray Vance	228	0.40
Mrs. Richard S. Manno	222	0.39
Manuel Zurita II	217	0.38
Noreen Galvin	215	0.38
Charles E. Williams	215	0.38
Beatrice Jackson	213	0.38
Mr. Richard S. Manno	211	0.37
Gabriel Williams	208	0.37
Sharon C. Trefry	207	0.37
Ernesto Cortes	199	0.35
Norman Gussman	191	0.34
Monsita Ayala	176	0.31
Elmira McIntosh Espinosa	175	0.31
Susa Grumer	146	0.26
Wesley L. Browne	133	0.24
Anthony Bradshaw	133	0.24
Oliver Tompkins	129	0.23
Annamaria Carrera	128	0.23
Bertram L. Charles	112	0.20
Samuel Mark Bass	104	0.18
Alphonse A. Donastorg Jr.	92	0.16
Timothy J. Robinson	65	0.12
Total	56,456	100.00
