= Belvedere, U.S. Virgin Islands =

Belvedere
- Village
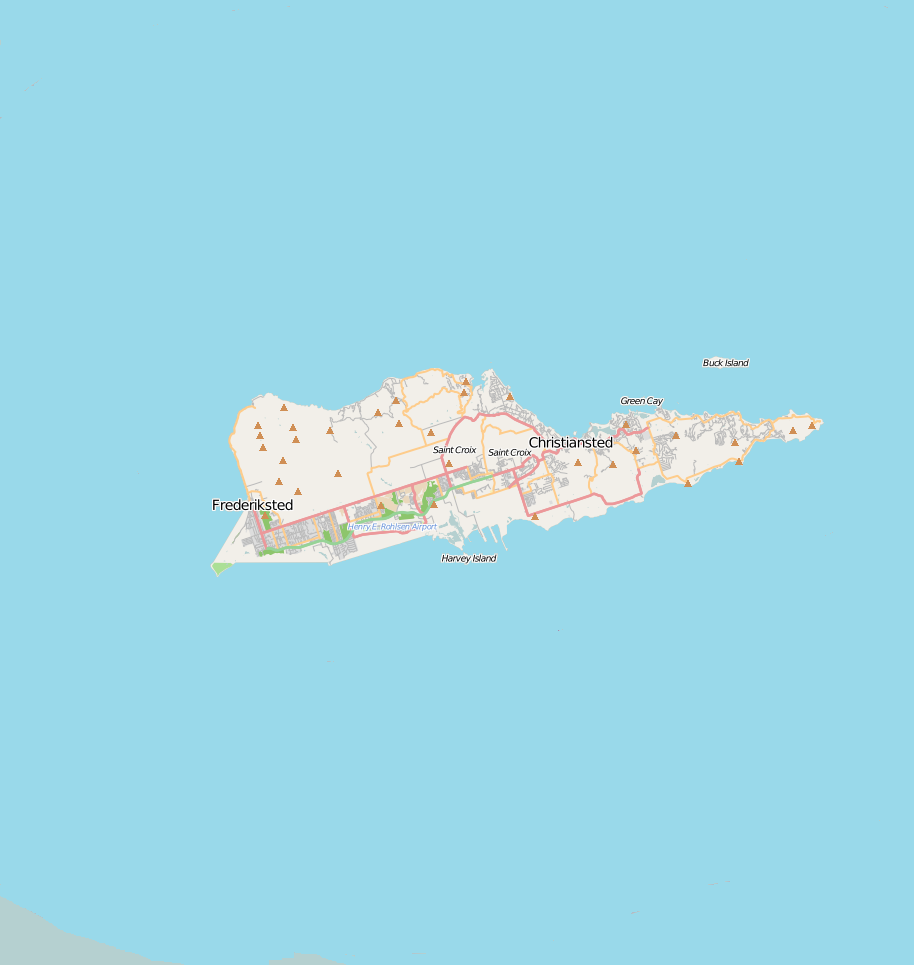
- Location in Saint Croix, United States Virgin Islands
- Coordinates: 17°46′35″N 64°47′56″W
- Country: United States Virgin Islands
- Island: Saint Croix
- Time zone: UTC-4 (AST)

Belvedere is a settlement on the north coast of the island of Saint Croix in the United States Virgin Islands. Belvedere lies along North Shore Road or Route 80.

== History ==
=== 18th century ===
The area was a major sugar producing area during the colonial period. Belvedere was exploited by the Danish at least as far back as 1763. Its former owners include lawyer and ship-owner Nicolai Adler Coppy (August 31, 1760 in Copenhagen – July 12, 1804). He is first mentioned on Saint Croix in 1779 and was licensed as a lawyer in 1785. He also owned the plantation Rust up Twist.

A sugar mill was built at Belvedere in 1795.

=== 19th century ===
In 1816, Belvedere (Northside Quarter Lt. B. No. 22, 23, Centre Police District, Christiansteds Jurisdiction) covered 300 acres of which 125 acres were planted with sugar canes and the other 175 acres were under other cultivation. A total of 117 enslaved labourers were present on the estate. On 25 September 1822, Belvedere was sold by auction to the Royal Loan Commission, for Ps. 50,000. On 6 September 1824, it was sold by the Royal Loan Commission to H. C. Knudsen for rigsdaler (Ps. 34,215). On 26 January 1852, Belvedere was sold to the State Treasury (mortgageholder, for $280,391 80 with interest from 31 December 1850) for 100 dollars. On 14 February 1852, Belvedere was sold by auction to Chamberlain Louis Rothe (1811-1871) for 15,800 dollars. Rothe served as Vice Governor of the islands. He died on St. Croix in 1871.

== Geography ==
To the west of the village is the aptly named Cane Bay. Belvedere lies along the Ram Head Trail which leads along the coast to Belvedere, overlooking the bay.

== Estate Belvedere ==
The sugar mill has been converted to Estate Belvedere, a luxury villa regularly used for wedding receptions; it retains much of its original structure. and covers 8,400 square feet. The villa has 6 bedrooms and accommodates 14 people, with king-sized beds and charges up to $1400 a night. It consists of several buildings; the main house contains a library and a gourmet kitchen and has 2 king bedrooms and a queen bedroom and there is a detached cottage which accommodates two people. Past the courtyard fountain is a two-story guesthouse with two suites, containing two queen sized beds and a kitchen. The estate is noted for its three and a half acres of gardens with flowering hibiscus and bougainvillea, multi level terraces and historical ruins. It also has one of the largest private pools on the island, measuring 40 by 20 feet (12.2 by 6.1 m). The villa also has a notable collection of Caribbean art and historical memorabilia and a powder room with a handpainted tropical mural.
