= 2025 in the United States Virgin Islands =

- Decades: 2000s; 2010s; 2020s
- See also: History of the United States Virgin Islands; Outline of the United States Virgin Islands; List of years in the United States Virgin Islands; 2025 in the United States

Events in the year 2025 in the United States Virgin Islands.

== Incumbents ==
- Governor: Albert Bryan Jr. (D)
- House Delegate: Stacey Plaskett (D)

== Events ==
- July 17 – Two police officers fatally shoot an unarmed 48-year-old man during a call at a St. Croix apartment complex.
- August 14 – The Virgin Islands begins sandbagging operations in response to Hurricane Erin, which passes near the islands.
- August 24 – Police kill a Seattle man during a burglary report in Frenchman's Bay.
- September – The only traffic light on Saint John is removed.
- November 21–28 – 2025 Paradise Jam
- December 16 – The U.S. government sues the Virgin Islands government over its gun ownership laws, arguing the violate the second amendment. The laws state that people who apply for a gun permit must have "good reason to fear death or great injury to his person or property" and have two people vouch for their need for a gun. Applicants are also required to have "good moral character" to obtain a permit.
