= Frederiksted Southeast, U.S. Virgin Islands =

Frederiksted Southeast
- Census-Designated Place
- Location within the United States Virgin Islands
- Coordinates: 17°42′11″N 64°52′35″W
- Country: United States
- Territory: U.S. Virgin Islands
- District: Saint Croix
- Elevation: 105 ft (32 m)

Population (2020)
  - Total: 1,746
- GNIS feature ID: 2414020

Frederiksted Southeast is a census designated place located on the island of St. Croix in the United States Virgin Islands.

== Demographics ==
=== 2020 Census ===
Frederiksted Southeast CDP, U.S. Virgin Islands – Racial and ethnic composition Note: the US Census treats Hispanic/Latino as an ethnic category. This table excludes Latinos from the racial categories and assigns them to a separate category. Hispanics/Latinos may be of any race.
Race / Ethnicity (NH = Non-Hispanic)	Pop 2020	% 2020
White alone (NH)	57	3.26%
Black or African American alone (NH)	1,320	75.60%
Native American or Alaska Native alone (NH)	1	0.06%
Asian alone (NH)	6	0.34%
Native Hawaiian or Pacific Islander alone (NH)	0	0.00%
Other race alone (NH)	2	0.11%
Mixed race or Multiracial (NH)	3	0.17%
Hispanic or Latino (any race)	357	20.45%
Total	1,746	100.00%
