= Salt River (United States Virgin Islands) =

- Location of mouth

Location
- Country: United States
- Territory: United States Virgin Islands
- Island: Saint Croix

Physical characteristics
- Mouth
  - coordinates: 17.7683°N 64.7599°W

The Salt River is a river in the United States Virgin Islands, located on Saint Croix island.
