= History of the United States Virgin Islands =

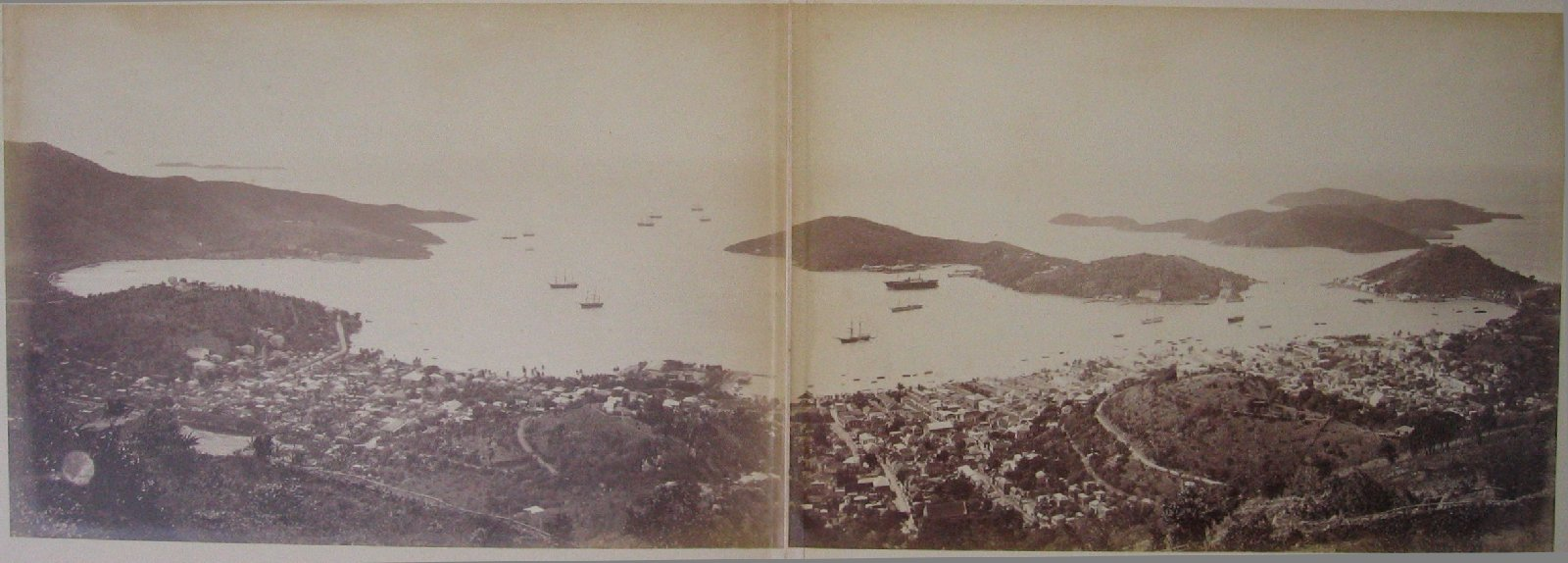
St. Thomas Harbor, c. 1874

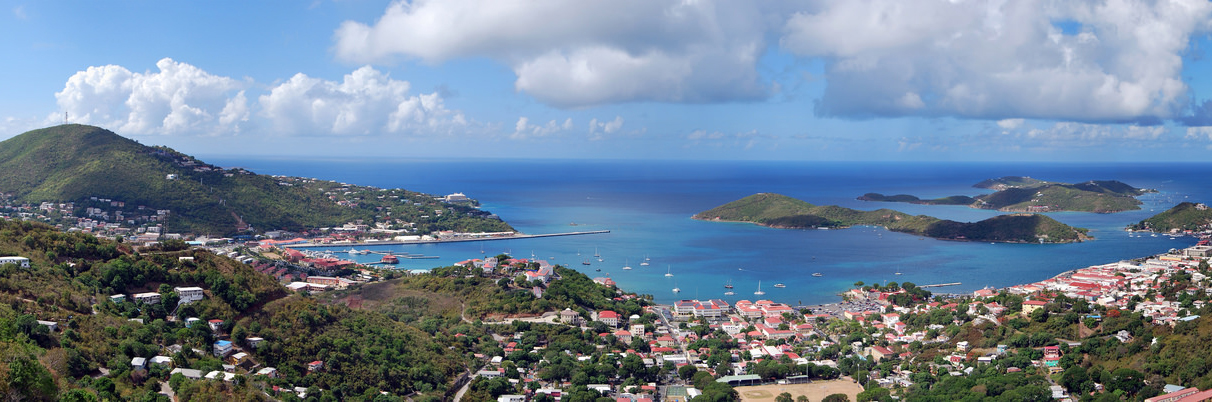
St. Thomas Harbor, 2015

The United States Virgin Islands, often abbreviated USVI, are a group of islands and cays located in the Lesser Antilles of the Eastern Caribbean, consisting of three main islands (Saint Croix, Saint John, and Saint Thomas) and fifty smaller islets and cays. Like many of their Caribbean neighbors, the history of the islands is characterized by native Amerindian settlement, European colonization, and the Atlantic slave trade.

Before the colonial period, the islands were inhabited at different times by the Arawak, Ciboney, and Kalinago peoples. Europeans first encountered the islands during Columbus' second voyage. Over the next century, settlers from across Western Europe laid claim to the land and the majority of Indigenous peoples either perished or were displaced. The islands initially profited from the triangular trade, and many enslaved peoples were brought to the islands, beginning in 1673.

The islands were acquired by the Danish West India Company between 1672 and 1733, eventually becoming known as the Danish West Indies in 1754 when they came under direct control of the King of Denmark. Following a slave rebellion in 1848, slavery was abolished in the Danish territories, and the plantation economy of the islands collapsed. Faced with mounting deficits, the Danish government repeatedly attempted to sell the islands. After decades of negotiations, the United States purchased the islands in 1917.

The United States Virgin Islands officially became an unincorporated U.S. territory in 1927, the same year Virgin Islanders were granted citizenship. Having been acquired primarily for strategic military purposes, the islands were initially under the control of the U.S. Navy and remained under its administration until 1931. Following the transition to a civilian government, it was not until 1968 that Virgin Islanders were granted the right to elect their own government. Although the islands were primarily agricultural throughout their colonial history, the tourism industry has dominated life since 1970 and is now its largest sector.

== Pre-Columbian history ==
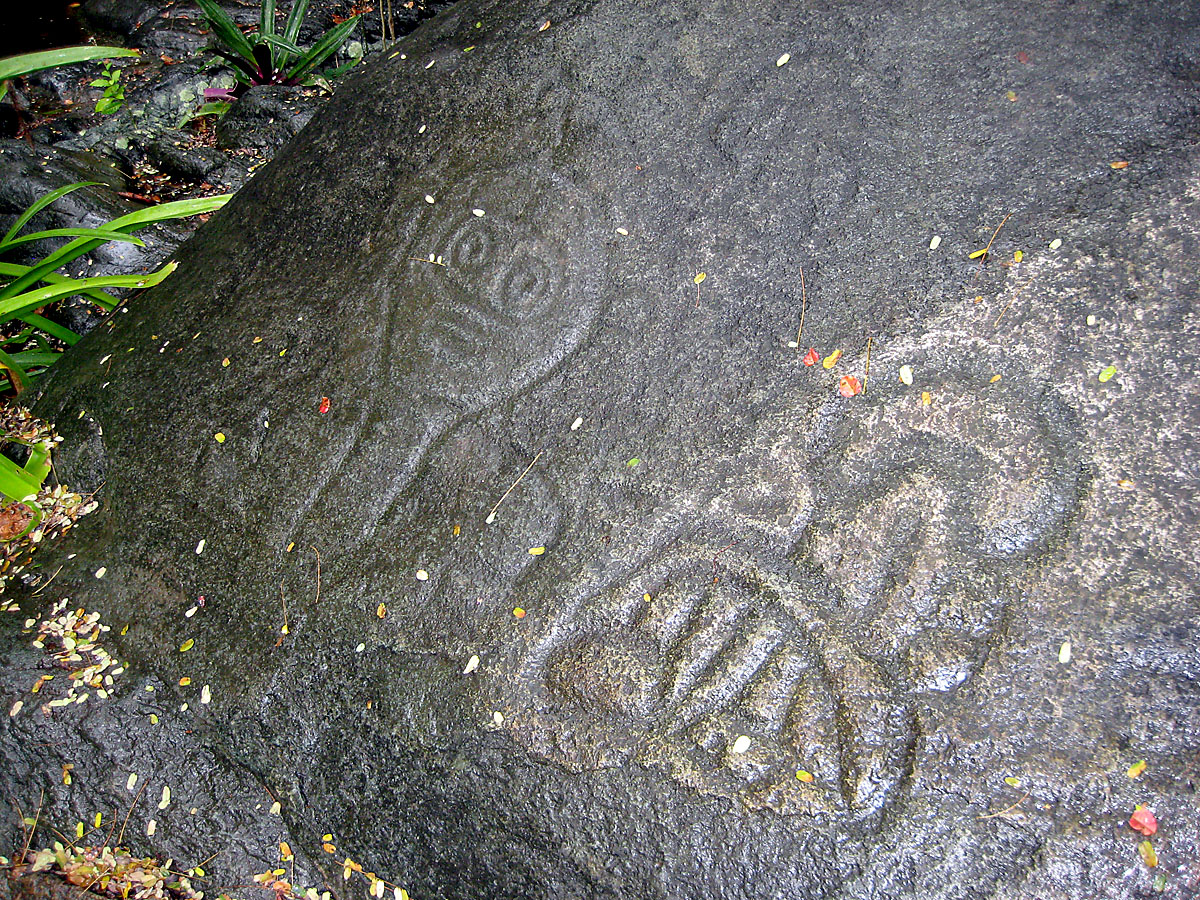
Reef Bay Trail petroglyphs in the Virgin Islands National Park

Archeological evidence shows that the Virgin Islands were inhabited for thousands of years before the arrival of Christopher Columbus. The earliest evidence of human presence on the islands comes from Saladoid-style ceramics dating back to c. 250 BCE.

The islands were inhabited at different times by the Arawak, Ciboney, and Kalinago peoples. These tribes were maritime peoples who subsisted primarily on hunting and gathering and used dugout canoes for transportation and fishing. The Ciboney people are thought to be the first to have settled the islands, around 300–400 BCE, followed by the Arawaks around 100–200 CE. The origins of the Ciboney people are unknown, though the Arawaks are believed to have originated from Central America, having traveled through the Lesser Antilles to reach the Virgin Islands.

The Saladoid culture was present in the Virgin Islands until c. 600 CE. This period was followed by the Ostionoid culture. An increase in the size of archeological sites dating to the Ostionoid period shows that the islands experienced population growth during this era. The majority of rock art on the Virgin Islands is dated to the Ostionoid period, after 1000 CE. A variety of such sites are preserved on the modern-day United States Virgin Islands; on outcroppings on the coast near Congo Cay, Botany Bay, and Robin Bay; petroglyphs at Salt River; and the Reef Bay figures at the base of a waterfall. The Reef Bay figures made by the Arawak peoples during this era are preserved at the Virgin Islands National Park on St. John.

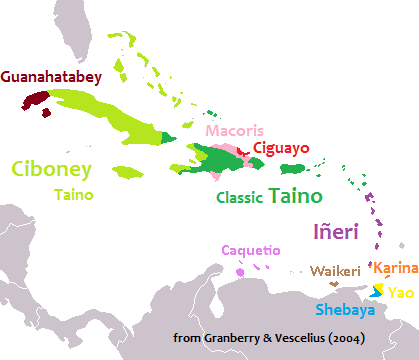
Languages of the Caribbean, 1500

During the 14th century, the Kalinago began settling the islands. Compared to the Arawak and Chiboney peoples, who had inhabited the islands for much of their history, the Kalinago had a more militant society. Archeological remains of bows with poisoned arrows, javelins, and clubs are dated to this era. At the time of their arrival, the existing Arawak society was comparatively more agrarian and primarily armed with spears. A significant number of the Arawak either fled or were killed by the Kalinago sometime before the arrival of Christopher Columbus in 1493. An archaeological site at Salt River Bay shows evidence that an Arawak religious center was taken over by the Kalinago during the 14th century. Remains of tools and everyday objects crafted from bone, shell, stone, cotton, grass, and hemp have also been discovered on the islands. Pottery from the Arawaks and Kalinago has also been preserved, while a lack of ceramic evidence suggests the Ciboneys did not work with clay. At the time of European arrival, the Taíno language was spoken throughout the Virgin Islands.

== Early colonial period, 1493–1733 ==
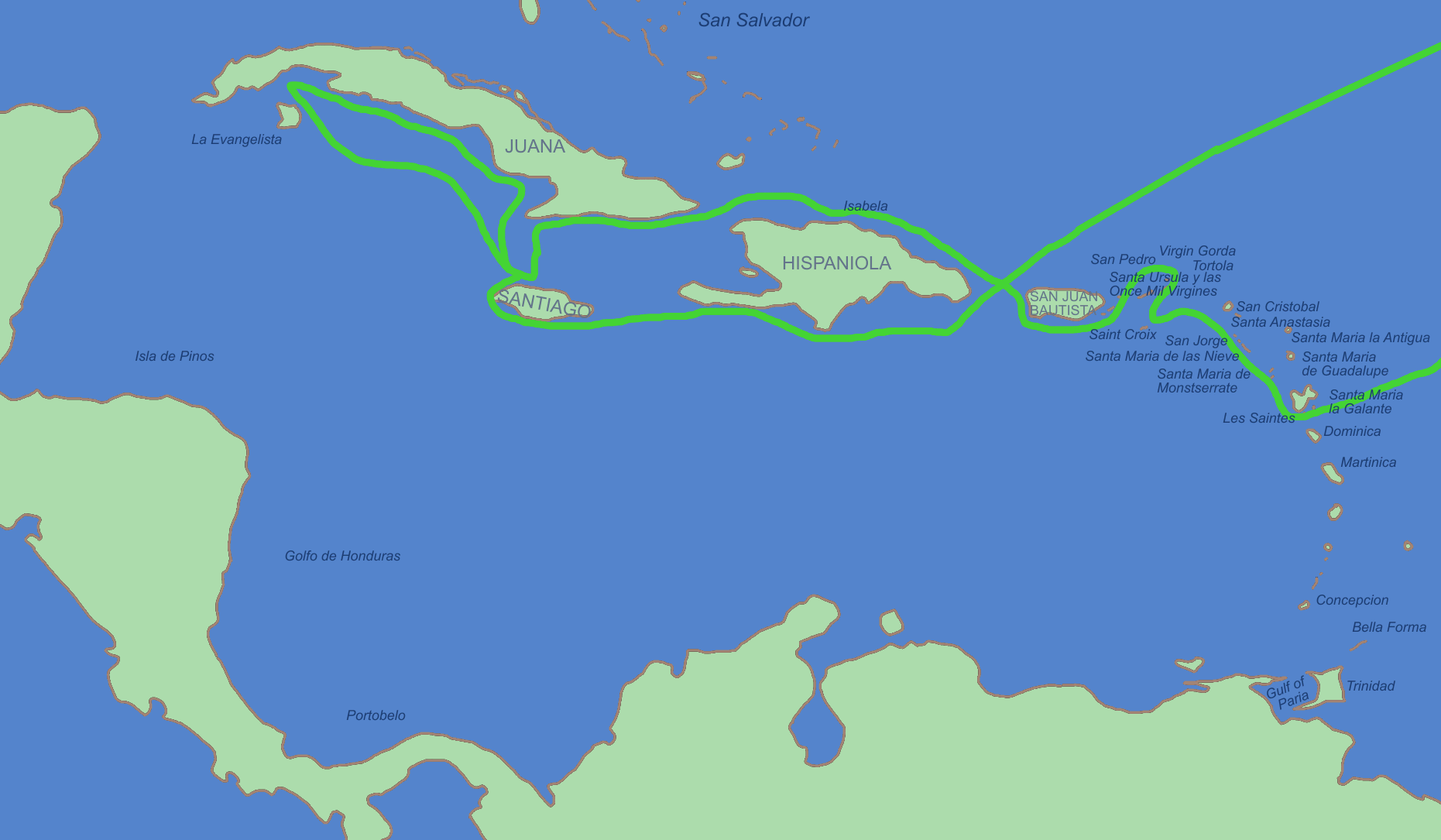
Map showing the route of Columbus' second voyage and the names he referred to islands as. The fleet arrived in the Caribbean at Guadeloupe, then traveling east towards Santa Ursula y las Once Mil Virgenes.

The first documented Europeans to visit the islands arrived with Christopher Columbus. Blown off course during his 1493–1496 voyage, Columbus encountered Saint Croix on November 14, 1493. A boat was sent ashore to the island, the crew of which was met by the native Amerindians. Their encounter quickly erupted into violence. Columbus' voyage continued north, exploring Saint Thomas and Saint John, without sending his crew ashore.

Columbus gave the islands their original Spanish names—Santa Cruz, San Tomas, and San Juan, all names with religious meanings. The collection of tiny islets, cays, and rocks dotting the sea around them reminded Columbus of Saint Ursula and her 11,000 virgin martyrs, which inspired him to name the archipelago Santa Ursula y las Once Mil Virgenes (English: Saint Ursula and her Eleven Thousand Virgins). According to Diego Álvarez Chanca, Columbus had chosen the name to "exaggerate his find" to the Spanish Crown. In practice, the name of the islands was shortened to Las Vîrgenes.

Disease, forced labor, assaults, and murders took an enormous toll on both the Arawak and Kalinago populations. Spanish forces frequently raided the Virgin Islands, enslaving the Indigenous people to work the mines of the Greater Antilles. Much of the population that was not captured eventually fled to the lower Caribbean islands. Around 1550, Charles V of Spain declared the native tribes enemies of the empire. As a result, most of the remaining Indigenous population either fled, were enslaved, or were killed soon thereafter.

While the islands of Saint Thomas and Saint John were not colonized until the 17th century, the island of Saint Croix saw several colonial settlements during the 16th century. Saint Croix's location, surrounded by possessions of the Spanish Empire meant that it was settled by "only the most desperate English, French or Dutch settlers." Passing Spanish ships often raided islands of the Lesser Antilles, but they favored a route through the northern Virgin Islands which frequently spared St. Croix.

In 1625, English and Dutch settlers took joint possession of Saint Croix. The island was later settled by the French too, leaving all three of these populations living in separate settlements. A 1645 conflict between the Dutch and English settlers resulted in the Dutch population fleeing to the Islands of St. Eustatius and St. Martin. The French population sided with the Dutch and relocated to the island of Guadeloupe. Following the incident, the English colonists remained the sole political claimants to the island until 1650, when they were ambushed by Spanish forces from Puerto Rico. After the Spanish had forced the English settlers to flee, the Dutch thought the island safe to return to, but upon their return were also attacked by the Puerto Rican authorities.

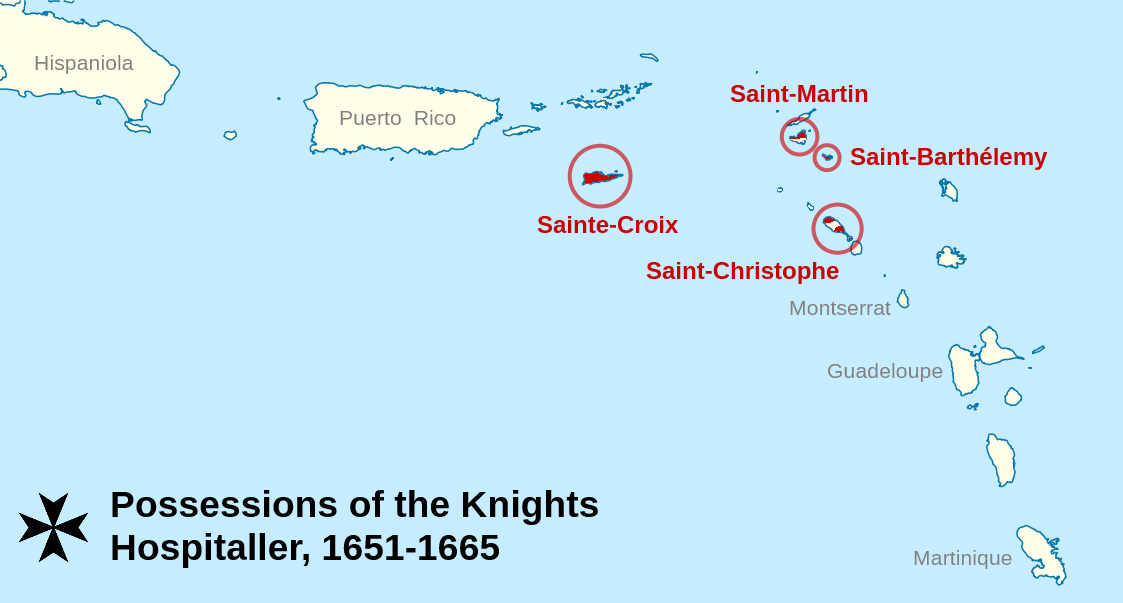
Hospitaller colonization of the Americas

Upon learning that the English had been expelled from St. Croix, the French Governor General of St. Christopher, Phillippe de Lonvilliers de Poincy, organized a military annexation of the island, which defeated the Spanish forces. Approximately 300 French colonists were then sent to resettle on the island. The colony was never profitable for the French despite further settlements in 1659 and 1661. During this time, administration of the island passed through several organizations: the Company of the American Islands (1650), Knights Hospitaller (1651–1665), and the French West India Company (1665–1696). Due to high mortality rates and economic losses, the island was abandoned in 1696, and the remaining colonists were relocated to Saint-Domingue.

== Danish colonial period, 1672–1917 ==
=== Danish West India Company ===
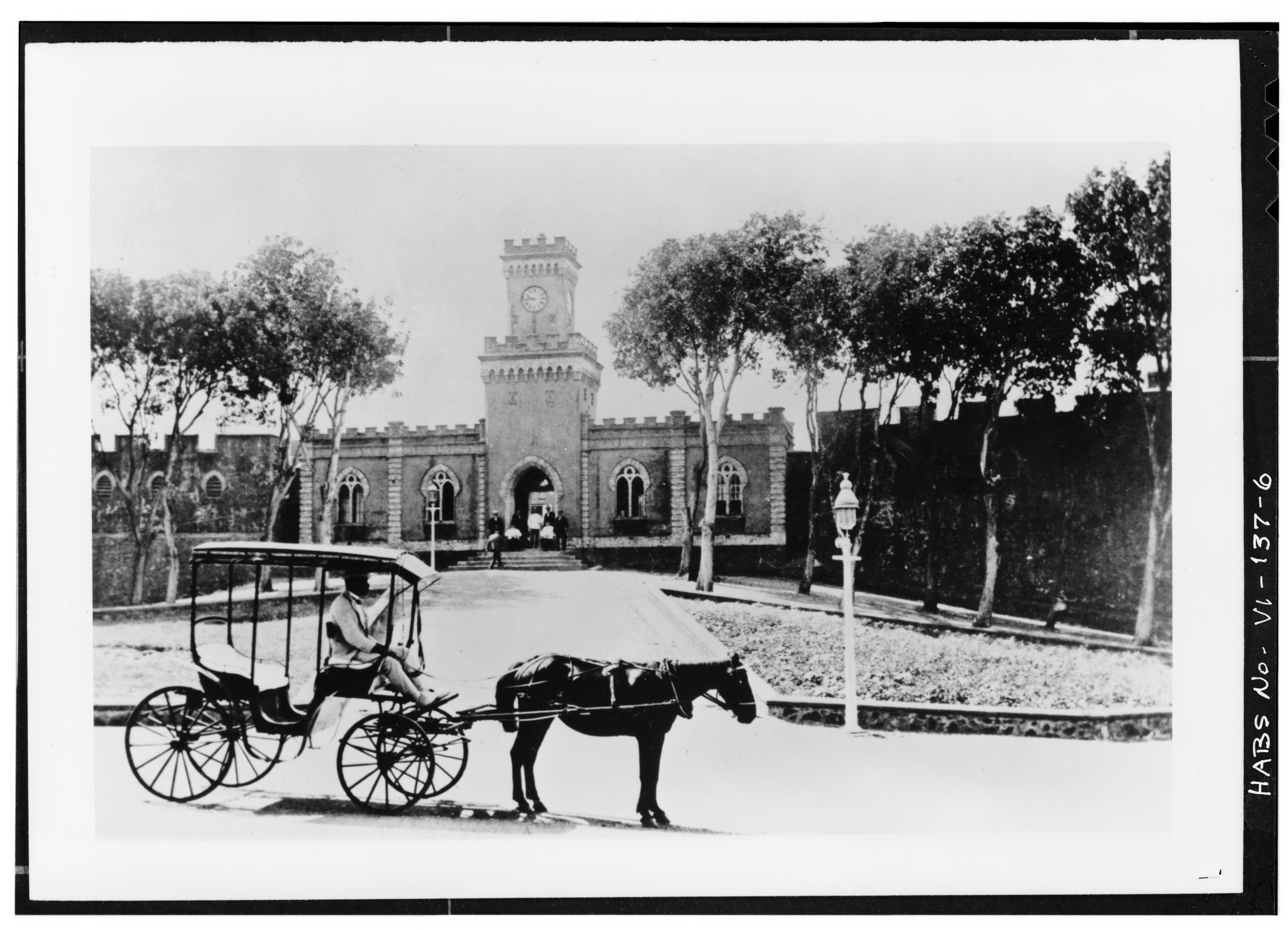
Fort Christian, originally built during the 1670s, photographed c. 1900

Following the Treaty of Copenhagen in 1670, the Danish West India Company was chartered by King Christian V in 1671. Through the charter, the company was permitted to annex any islands "as might be uninhabited and suitable for plantations, or if inhabited, then by such people who have no knowledge concerning us." (Note: The phrase "such people who have no knowledge concerning us" was used in reference to indigenous populations, who were not considered a geo-political threat to the state or recognized as valid claimants to their lands.) In particular, the charter authorized the company to occupy Saint Thomas, which was then annexed in 1672. Beginning in 1673, enslaved peoples were brought from Africa to work on the plantations of St. Thomas.

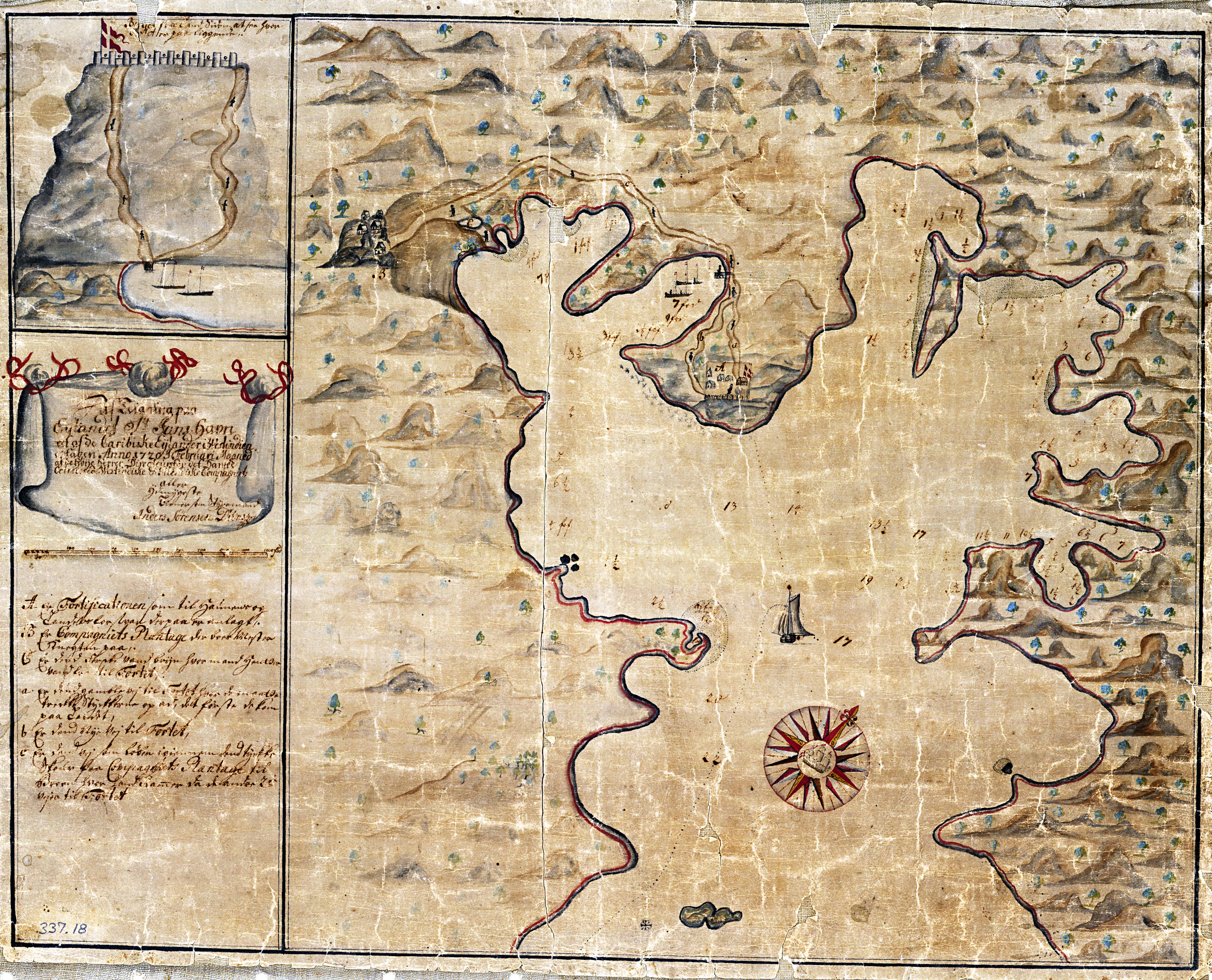
Map of St. John and Coral Bay, 1720

From 1675 and onwards, the company made several unsuccessful attempts to colonize Saint John. Governor Jørgen Iversen Dyppel stationed two men on the island in 1675, but no permanent settlement was made. In 1684, Governor Adolph Esmit employed two merchants from Barbados who then sent 40 men to occupy the island. Esmit had hoped that by involving English subjects in a seemingly economic endeavor, he would avoid any military opposition. However, two sloops were promptly sent by Governor William Stapleton of the nearby English Leeward Islands, which drove away the men occupying the island. In 1718, the company successfully annexed Saint John by establishing a settlement in Coral Bay. By 1733, St. John had a population of 1,295, 84% of which were enslaved peoples.

Following a drought in the late 1720s, the Danish West India Company sought to expand to the nearby island of St. Croix to acquire more arable land. The island had been unoccupied by its French owners since 1696. The French were willing to sell the island to the Danish to secure their neutrality and money for the War of the Polish Succession. In 1733, the Danish West India Company purchased Saint Croix from the French West India Company in exchange for 750,000 livres. The treaty which gave Denmark sovereignty stipulated that the islands could not be sold to another nation in the future without the consent of the French government. This would become relevant 132 years later when the island was sold to the United States in 1917. When the Danish acquired it, there were approximately 150 British settlers and 400–500 enslaved people on Saint Croix, who were allowed to remain if they swore allegiance to the king of Denmark.

However, the Danish West India Company faced continued financial problems and shareholders began to consider drastic measures in order to preserve their assets. As early as 1746, it was proposed that the king take over the company's collective assets at the general assembly of shareholders. In 1754, John William Schopen presented King Frederick V with a petition on behalf of St. Croix's burgher council, urgently requesting for the colonists on St. Croix to be placed under the direct jurisdiction of the king. On May 9, 1754, the Board of Trade announced its support for the proposal. By this point, the company's debts were estimated at 1,000,000 rigsdaler.

=== Royal colonies ===
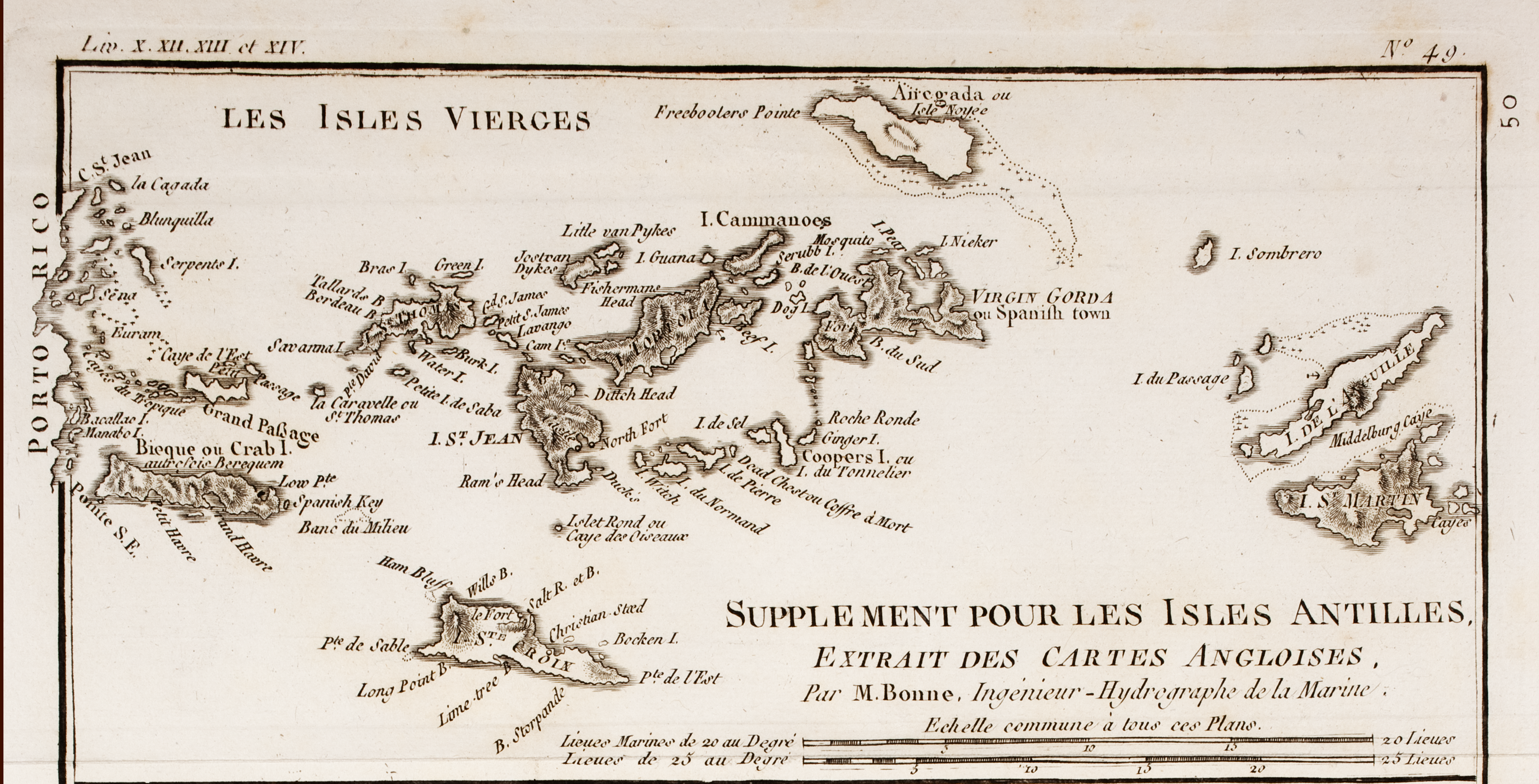
Map of the Virgin Islands, 1780

King Frederick V of Denmark–Norway assumed direct control of the former territories of the Danish West India Company in 1754, inheriting all of its assets and debts. Although the crown had acquired the company's assets, it had no intention of maintaining the islands as a public enterprise. The crown paid the par value for the 1,250 shares of the company, coming to a total of 1,250,000 rigsdalers. Collectively, the islands became known as the Danish West Indian Islands (Danish: De dansk-vestindiske øer). In 1766, the Danish West Indian rigsdaler was minted for the first time. It remained in use as the islands' currency until 1849, when it was replaced by the daler. Sugar production in the Danish West Indies drove the economy of the islands during royal control. At its peak in the late 18th century, more than 58% of the land area on St. Croix was in use for sugar cultivation. Across the islands, cotton, indigo, and tobacco plantations were also prevalent. These plantations relied almost exclusively on slave labor.

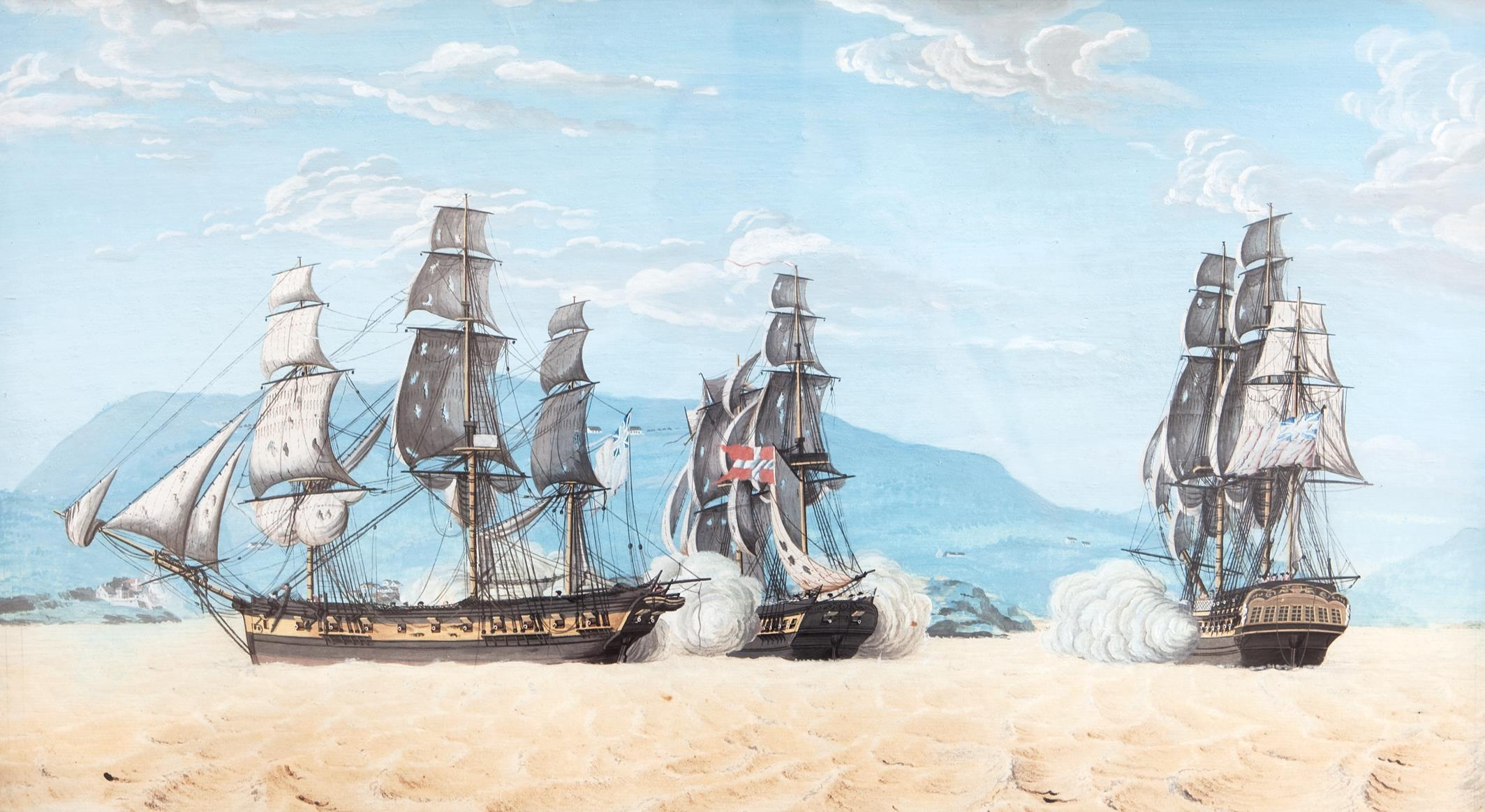
The Battle of West Kay, March 3, 1801

British forces occupied the Danish West Indies in 1801–1802 and again from 1807 to 1815 during the French Revolutionary and Napoleonic Wars. Because Denmark was effectively allied with Napoleon, Britain occupied the islands to prevent them from possible military use by the French Empire. On both occasions, the islands had minimal naval protection and quickly surrendered to British forces. The first occupation officially ended in 1802 with the Treaty of Amiens. The second occupation began in 1807 and lasted until 1815, when they were returned to Denmark in exchange for Heligoland through the Treaty of Paris.

=== Slavery and emancipation ===
Under the Danish West India Company, the islands expanded their reliance on a plantation economy and slave labor. Trading posts were set up on the islands by the company, trading in sugar, enslaved people, and other goods. The difficult conditions and enslavers' inhumane treatment created discontent. In 1733 a long drought, a devastating hurricane, and the new slave codes enforced by Governor Philip Gardelin pushed enslaved people in St. John to a breaking point. In November of that year, approximately 150 enslaved members of the Akwamu tribe revolted, seizing control of the island. The Danish company enlisted the help of French and Swiss troops from Martinique to regain control. The rebellion officially ended in late August 1734, after all rebels on the island were captured. Controls on the colony's Afro-Caribbean population were increased after the revolt. The population, however, was not immobilized and at least 14 slave rebellions were raised between 1733 and 1776.

Some escaped slaves, or maroons, established a community known as Maroonberg (lit. 'Maroon Mountain' or 'Maroon Hill') in the remote ridges of northwestern St. Croix. The settlement was built into the dense vegetation of the forest and was likely at its largest in the early 1700s. Others escaped the nearby islands of Puerto Rico or Tortola by constructing makeshift boats, stealing ships, or hijacking vessels they had been forced to man. An estimated 300 enslaved people escaped to Puerto Rico from the Danish West Indies through these means.

By 1778, it was estimated that 3,000 enslaved Africans had been brought to the Danish West Indies yearly. In 1789, enslaved people constituted 88% of the islands' population. As the mercantile interests of the islands became more profitable, an increasing number of enslaved peoples worked in ports instead of agricultural plantations. A 1792 decree issued by King Christian VII attempted to prohibit the transatlantic slave trade, though the practice was not actually abolished within the kingdom until 1803. The delay in prohibiting international trade was reportedly to give plantation owners a chance to "stock up". For example, on St. John the number of enslaved people increased by 40% during the 11-year period. Even after 1803, the slave trade continued within the Danish West Indies, although importation was prohibited. By 1838, a total of more than 100,000 enslaved people had been imported to the Danish West Indies; some of whom were then sold to other colonies.

Pressure mounted in the following decades as other colonial regimes in the Caribbean abolished slavery completely: Great Britain in 1833 and France in 1848. The Governor General of the Danish West Indies, Peter von Scholten, traveled to Denmark to petition for the emancipation of enslaved peoples within the kingdom in 1833. Though his petition was unsuccessful, in 1834 von Scholten secured an ordinance which allowed an enslaved person to purchase their freedom without the expressed consent of the slaveholder.

It is likely that von Scholten's views were influenced by his free-colored mistress Anna Heegaard. At the time, there was a growing free-colored population on the islands, which by 1835 represented 25% of the total population. Though not enslaved, this population was subject to strict regulations and restrictions which limited their rights and segregated them from the ruling class.

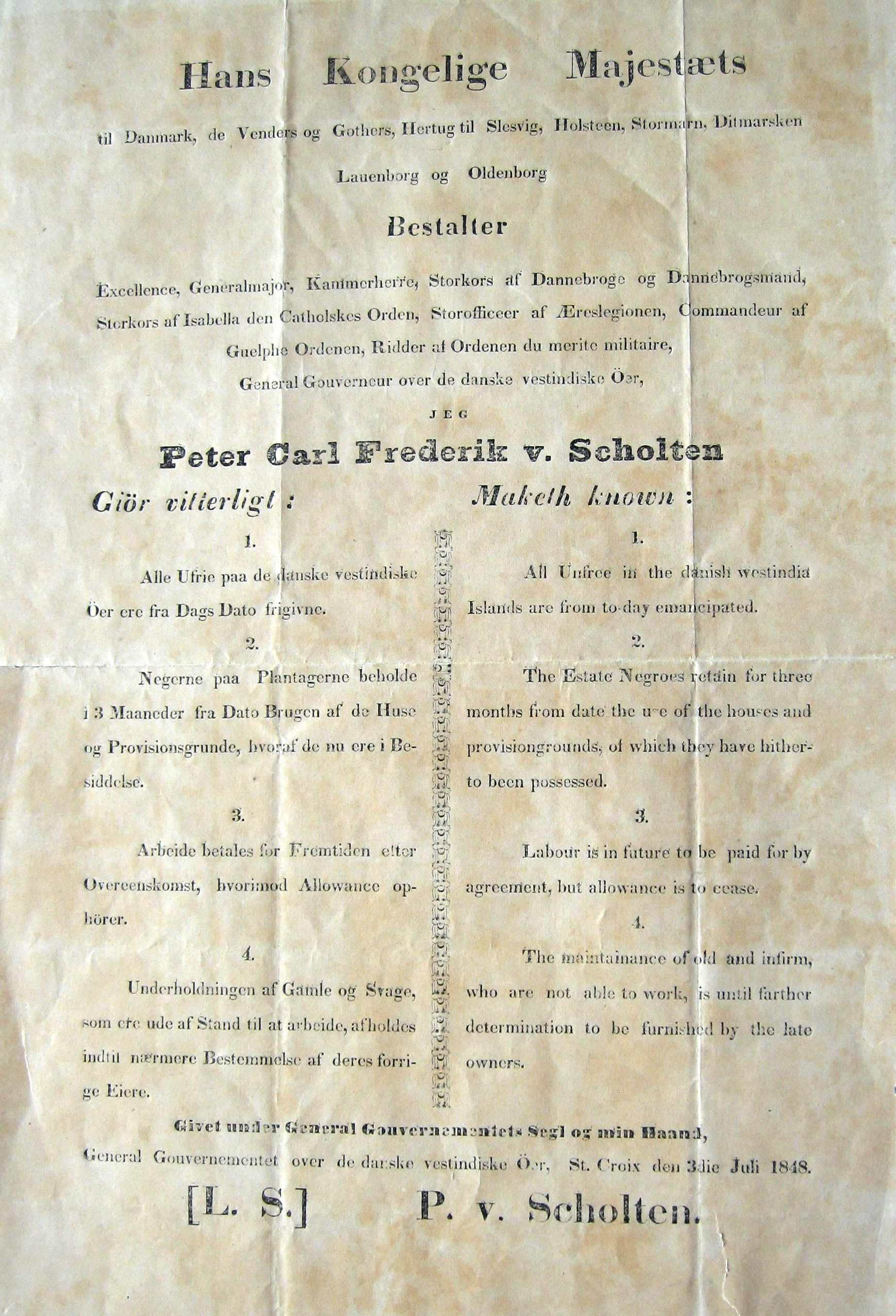
Emancipation proclamation distributed by Governor-General Peter von Scholten, July 1848

In 1848, King Christian VIII enacted a gradual abolition of slavery, ruling that every child born would be free from birth and promising that slavery would be entirely abolished at a later date. Dissatisfied by these meager appeasements, the enslaved population of the islands remained in a state of unrest. General Buddhoe (Moses Gottlieb) and Admiral Martin King organized a rebellion, and on July 2, 1848, approximately 8,000 people gathered outside of Fort Frederik. On July 3, 1848, General Buddhoe delivered an ultimatum, declaring that the crowd would burn down the surrounding town of Frederiksted unless emancipation was declared within the next four hours. Governor Von Scholten promptly announced that "all unfree in the Danish West Indies are from today emancipated." Today, July 3 is celebrated in the U.S. Virgin Islands as Emancipation Day. In reality, the Governor-General did not have the authority to abolish slavery.

As a result of his actions, von Scholten was denounced by slaveowners and members of the Danish government who stood to lose a large part of their wealth through emancipation. He was forced to resign from his position and return to Denmark on July 14. There, he was court-martialed and found guilty of dereliction of duty. Despite convicting von Scholten, a royal proclamation was issued on September 22, 1848 confirming the legality of his declaration of emancipation. His conviction was unanimously reversed by the Supreme Court in 1852.

Despite repeated petitions made by plantation owners requesting compensation for the loss of their slave labor, the Danish government was reluctant to acknowledge their claims. In 1853, the Danish Parliament awarded enslavers compensation, at 50 dollars per enslaved person, which was largely paid out in government bonds.

=== Post-emancipation labor and migration ===
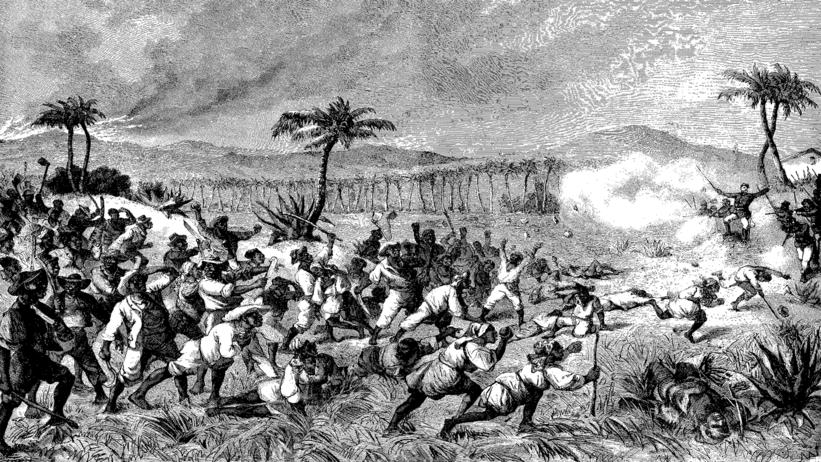
From The Revolt on St. Croix from Illustreret Tidende, November 1878

After the abolition of slavery in 1848, conditions for formerly enslaved workers on the islands did not improve significantly. Workers were paid meager rates, struggled to provide for themselves, and in many cases, were forced to work at the same plantations as before the rebellion. Regulations proposed by planters to maintain their labor force eventually resulted in the Labor Act of 1849. The act created a system of serfdom which gave plantation owners sweeping rights over their contract laborers. To much of the freed population, this system was merely a new form of bondage, and their continued struggle eventually led to the 1878 St. Croix labor riot, in which most of Frederiksted and around 50 surrounding plantations were destroyed by fire. Conditions and pay improved slightly after the rebellion, though they continued to be exploited and discriminated against.

Although many former slaves remained employed on plantations after emancipation, a significant number sought employment in urban areas working at the docks, as porters, and as coal carriers, among other occupations. Restrictive labor laws and unemployment spurred others to immigrate to the British Virgin Islands and Puerto Rico. The movement of former slaves away from plantation work, compounded by high death rates among the freed population, created a labor vacuum on the islands' plantations. A form of indentured labour was designed to replace slave labor, whereby an estimated 10,000 "contract workers" migrated to the islands between 1849 and 1917. The majority of these indentured workers arrived to the islands in the decades immediately following emancipation, between the 1850s and 1870s.

Most migrants during this era were young working men who only stayed on the islands temporarily to fulfil their working contract. Some, however, stayed after their contract had elapsed. Of the estimated 10,000 workers who came to the islands during this era, more than 90% were from the Lesser Antilles, with the majority coming from Barbados, which was then experiencing a labor surplus. Significant numbers of workers from the Madeira Islands and India also migrated under this scheme.

== Negotiations of sale ==
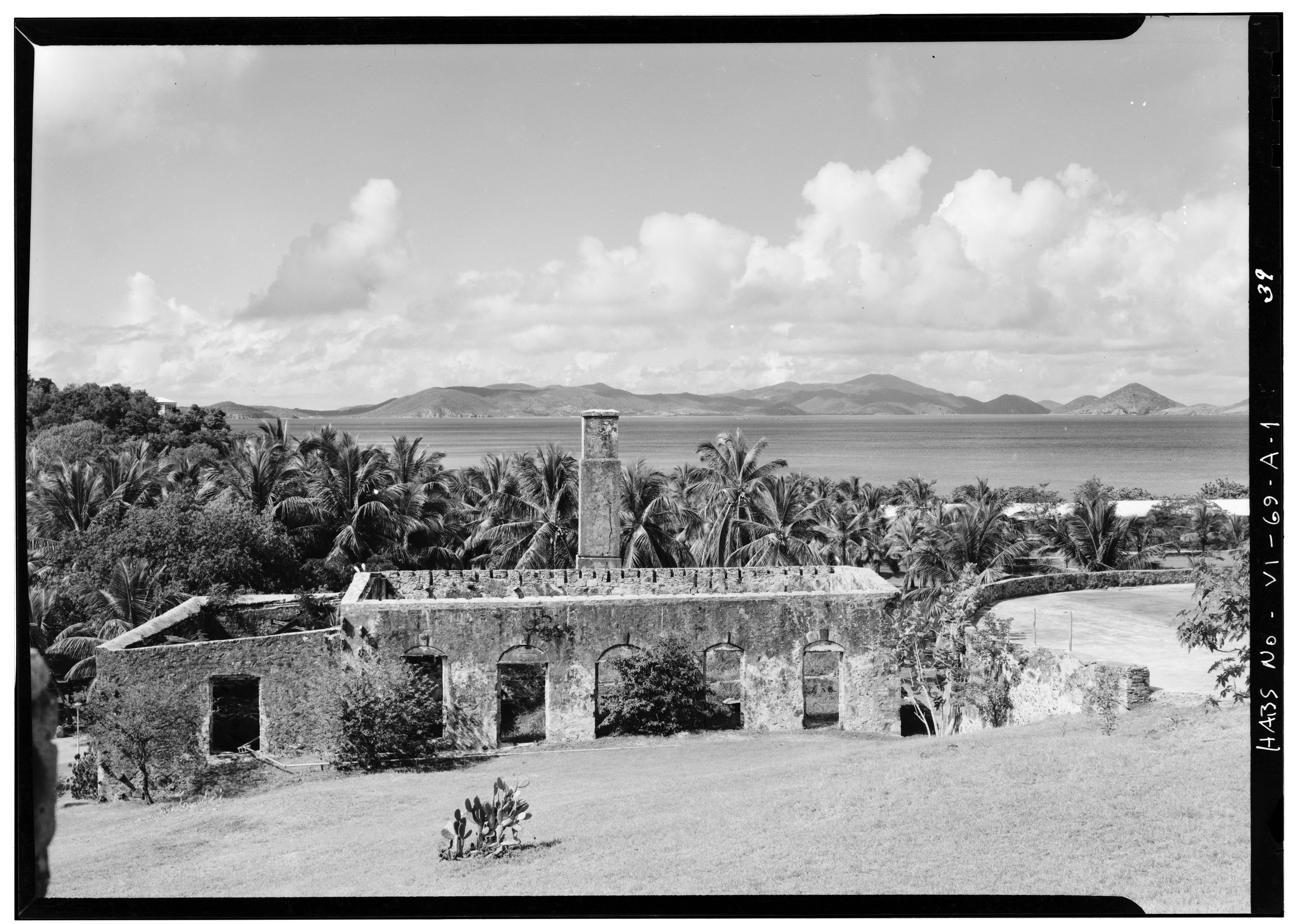
Ruins of the Caneel Bay plantation's sugar factory, c. 1933

After the abolition of slavery in the islands, the plantation economy of the islands collapsed. Sugar produced in St. Croix was met with intense competition on the global market, while shipping and trade on St. Thomas had already declined. The islands became a strategic and financial burden to the Danish state. Meanwhile, the United States had developed a strategic military interest in the islands in order to strengthen their position in the Caribbean. On-and-off negotiations with the United States to sell the islands began in 1866 and were not fully concluded until 1917.

Spurred on by fears that Prussia and Austria would annex the islands after defeating Denmark in the Second Schleswig War, William H. Seward entered into negotiations with Waldemar Raasløff in 1866. As a result of their talks, a treaty was signed on October 24, 1867, in which the Americans would acquire St. Thomas and St. John in exchange for 7.5 million dollars in gold. At the King's behest, a referendum was held on the islands on January 9, 1868. An overwhelming majority voted in favor of the sale. Despite widespread support for the treaty, the United States Senate refused to ratify it before its deadline in April 1870. The agreement for purchase then elapsed.

American interest in the colonies was renewed in 1898 when rumors spread that they might be sold to Germany. Danish Captain Walter Christmas' recent attempts to sell the islands to Germany had failed, but caused great alarm in the U.S. The U.S. offered Denmark $3.5 million in gold for all three islands. Negotiations on the sale price and the privileges of the island populations then ensued. On January 24, 1902, an agreement was finally reached, and a treaty was signed. The United States Congress ratified the treaty in February. In Denmark, the lower house approved the sale on March 14 by a vote of 88 to 7, but the conservative upper house found itself at an impasse. A vote on October 22, 1902, was evenly split, with 32 votes for the sale and 32 against it. As a result, the treaty was not ratified and met the same fate as its 1868 predecessor. The United States' first secretary in London, Henry White, attributed the failure to the influence of Wilhelm II, Kaiser of the ascendant German Empire.

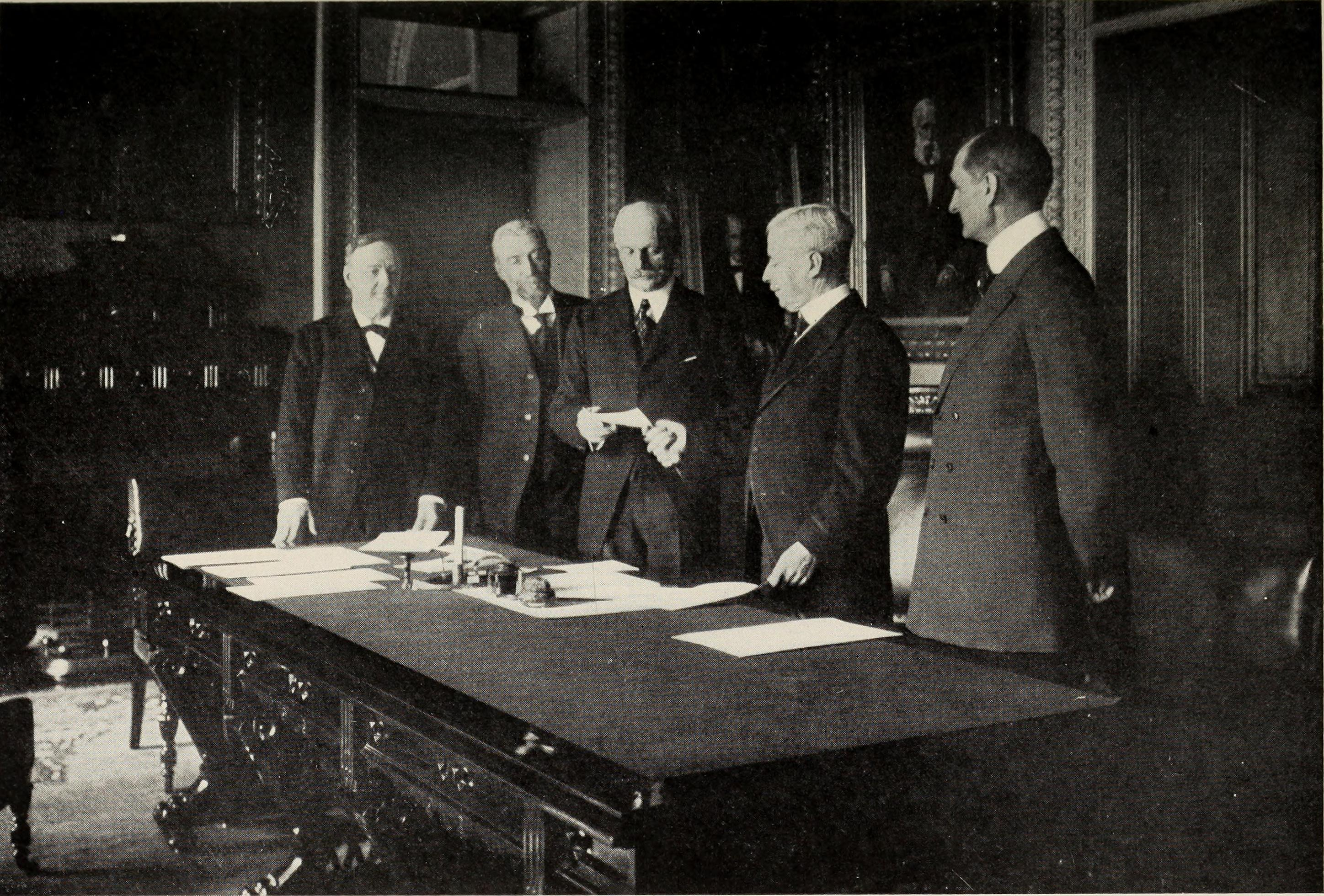
Ambassador Brun receives a check for $25 million, finalizing the sale of the Danish West Indies to the United States, March 31, 1917.

During World War I, US interest in the islands was revived by fear of German expansion into the Caribbean. In particular, it was feared that Germany would seize the islands for use as a U-boat base or coaling station. The islands' location on the Atlantic approach to the newly completed Panama Canal was strategically important for the United States. The US offered $25,000,000, and the third sales treaty was signed on August 4, 1916. On August 17, an unofficial referendum on the sale of the islands to the United States was held in the Danish West Indies, in which 99% of voters within the islands were in favor of the sale. The population of the islands were largely dissatisfied with Danish colonial rule which they saw as negligent and ineffective, and anticipated a better relationship with the United States which had a vested interest in the region.

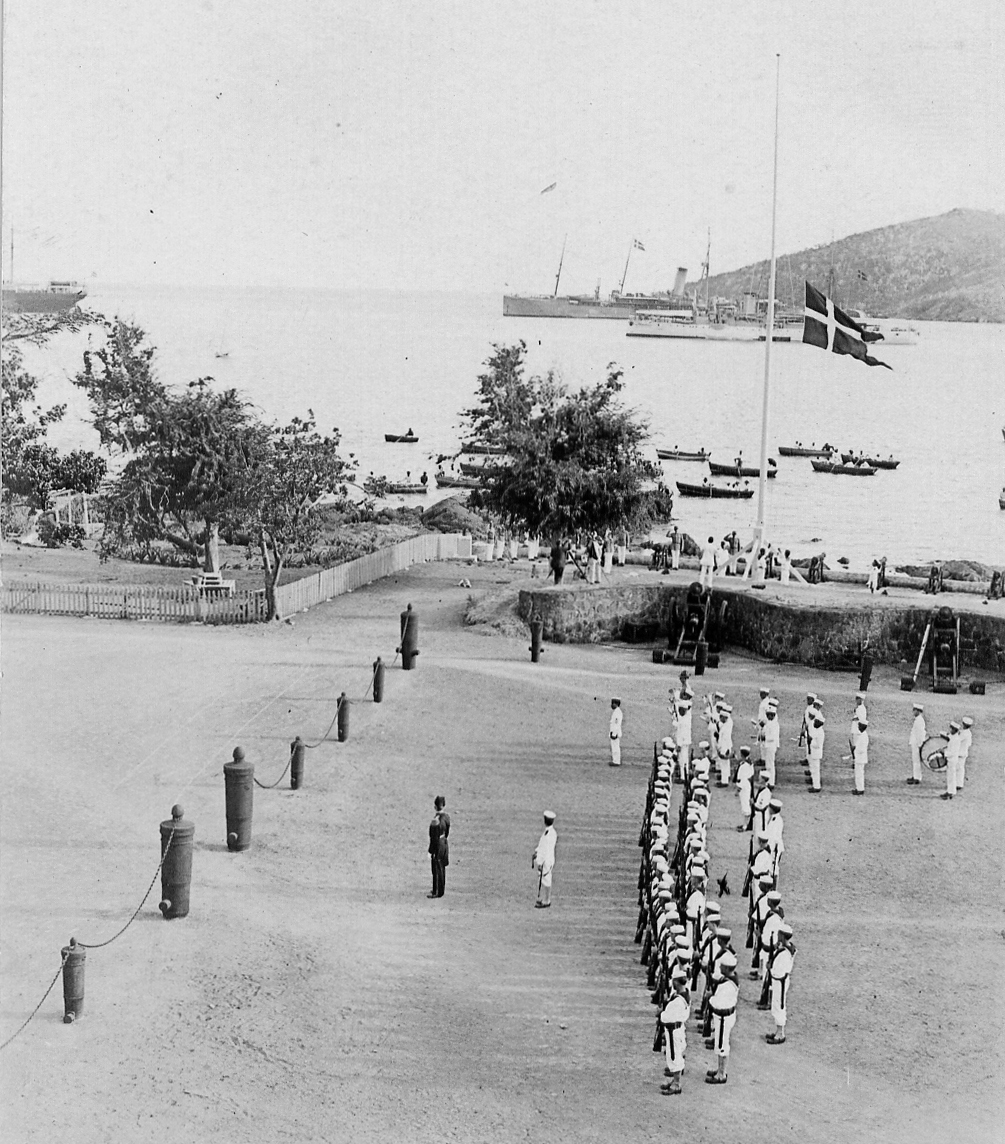
The Danish flag is lowered at the Governor's Mansion for the last time, March 31, 1917.

At the following non-binding referendum held in Denmark on December 14, 64% of the public also voted in favor of the sale. The treaty was subsequently ratified by the Danish parliament on December 20, 1916, signed by both the King of Denmark on December 22, and by the US president on January 16, 1917. The United States officially took possession of the islands on March 31, 1917, when Danish ambassador Constantin Brun was presented with a warrant for the agreed $25 million in gold. At the same time the United States agreed that they would "not object to the Danish Government extending their political and economic interests to the whole of Greenland", reciprocally ceding interest in that island for a larger sphere of influence in the Caribbean. Thus, nearly 250 years of Danish administration ended

== American period, 1917–present ==
After the United States officially took possession of the islands, they were renamed the Virgin Islands of the United States. March 31 is celebrated annually as Transfer Day. Rear Admiral Sumner Kitelle ordered yeoman Percival Wilson Sparks, who was known to be interested in graphic design, to design a new flag for the territory. Sparks had his wife, St. Thomas resident Grace Joseph Sparks, and her sister, Blanche Joseph Sasso, sew the first flag as professionally made flags had to be manufactured in the States and would take weeks to arrive by ship.

Racist cartoon published in the Danish magazine Klods-Hans in January 1917 about the treaty of the Danish West Indies. It depicts Woodrow Wilson as having "adopted" the three islands of St. Thomas, St. John and St. Croix (depicted as pickaninnies) from Denmark.

The treaty which transferred the islands to the United States stipulated Virgin Islanders needed to declare a desire to maintain Danish citizenship within one year of the transfer, or would be assumed to have renounced it in favor of American citizenship. To the frustration of the population, Congress did not grant citizenship to most Virgin Islanders until February 25, 1927, the same year the islands officially became an unincorporated U.S. territory. The Danish West Indian daler remained the currency of the U.S. Virgin Islands until 1934, when the United States dollar became legal tender.

=== Naval administration ===
The islands were acquired by the United States just one week before the country declared war on Germany and entered World War I. Having been primarily acquired out of fear that Germany would gain territory in the Caribbean, the islands were initially envisioned as a naval base. Although the islands were not an official possession of the navy, the president, by appointing naval officers to run the territory, granted the navy de facto control of them.

Under naval administration the public health and civil infrastructure of the islands improved. Efforts were also made to improve public education. However, the navy sought to use this educational program to "Americanize" the Virgin Island population, suppressing the use of languages other than English and rejecting accommodations to the existing cultures. While these programs were of some benefit to the islands, the navy was otherwise ill-equipped to provide for the civilian population, and under its care the islands' economy struggled. Demands for reforms to the failing agricultural industry went unanswered by the navy. As a result, the total cultivated area on the islands dropped by approximately 60% under naval administration. Virgin Islanders left seeking work elsewhere in the Caribbean and the continental United States, causing the population to fall by approximately 16% despite improved mortality rates. The economic decline of the islands meant that the islands required significant federal aid and were a financial burden on the national government.

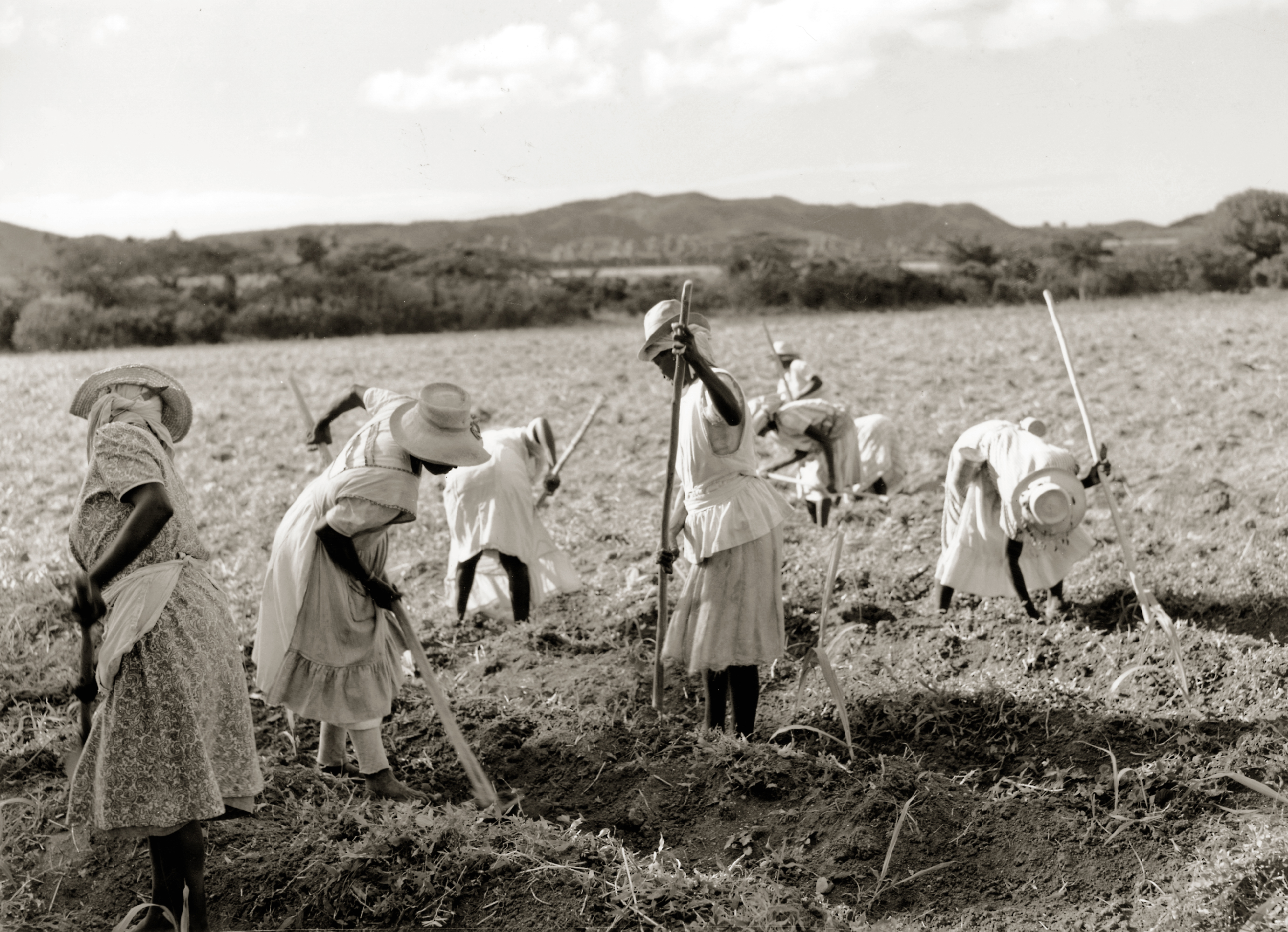
Women cultivating sugarcane, c. 1940

After visiting the islands in March 1931, President Herbert Hoover sought to redevelop the economy and encourage financial independence. That year, following recommendations from the Bureau of Efficiency, direct control of the islands was transferred from the Department of the Navy to the Department of the Interior and the naval station on St. Thomas was decommissioned. This transfer began the transition of the islands away from militarization and towards a permanent civilian government.

=== Constitutional conventions ===
An organic act (Pub. L. 64–389, 39 Stat. 1132) was passed by the U.S. Congress on March 3, 1917, pre-emptively establishing the governance of the islands before they were officially acquired. The act was meant to establish a temporary government, yet remained in place until it was replaced on June 22, 1936. The resulting Organic Act of the Virgin Islands of the United States (Pub. L. 74–749, 49 Stat. 1807) was then replaced by the Revised Organic Act of the Virgin Islands in 1954.

On October 21, 1976, President Gerald Ford signed Pub. L. 94–584, granting the citizens of the islands the right to organize their own government and establish a constitution. Though none have succeeded, at least four constitutional conventions have since attempted to establish a constitution for the islands: in 1972, 1979, 1981, and 2009. The Fifth Constitutional Convention of the U.S. Virgin Islands passed a proposed constitution on May 26, 2009. The draft was eventually forwarded to President Barack Obama in December, who then submitted it to the United States Congress on February 26, 2010. The office of the President, the U.S. Congress, and the U.S. Department of Justice took issue with several aspects of the document. Congress did not ratify the constitution and instead urged the convention to revise the document. Governor de Jongh issued an act convening the Fifth Revision Convention on September 11, 2012. The delegates met in October 2012 but disagreed on a new draft. As a result, the Revised Organic Act of the Virgin Islands from 1954 remains the article that defines the islands' government.

=== Civilian government ===
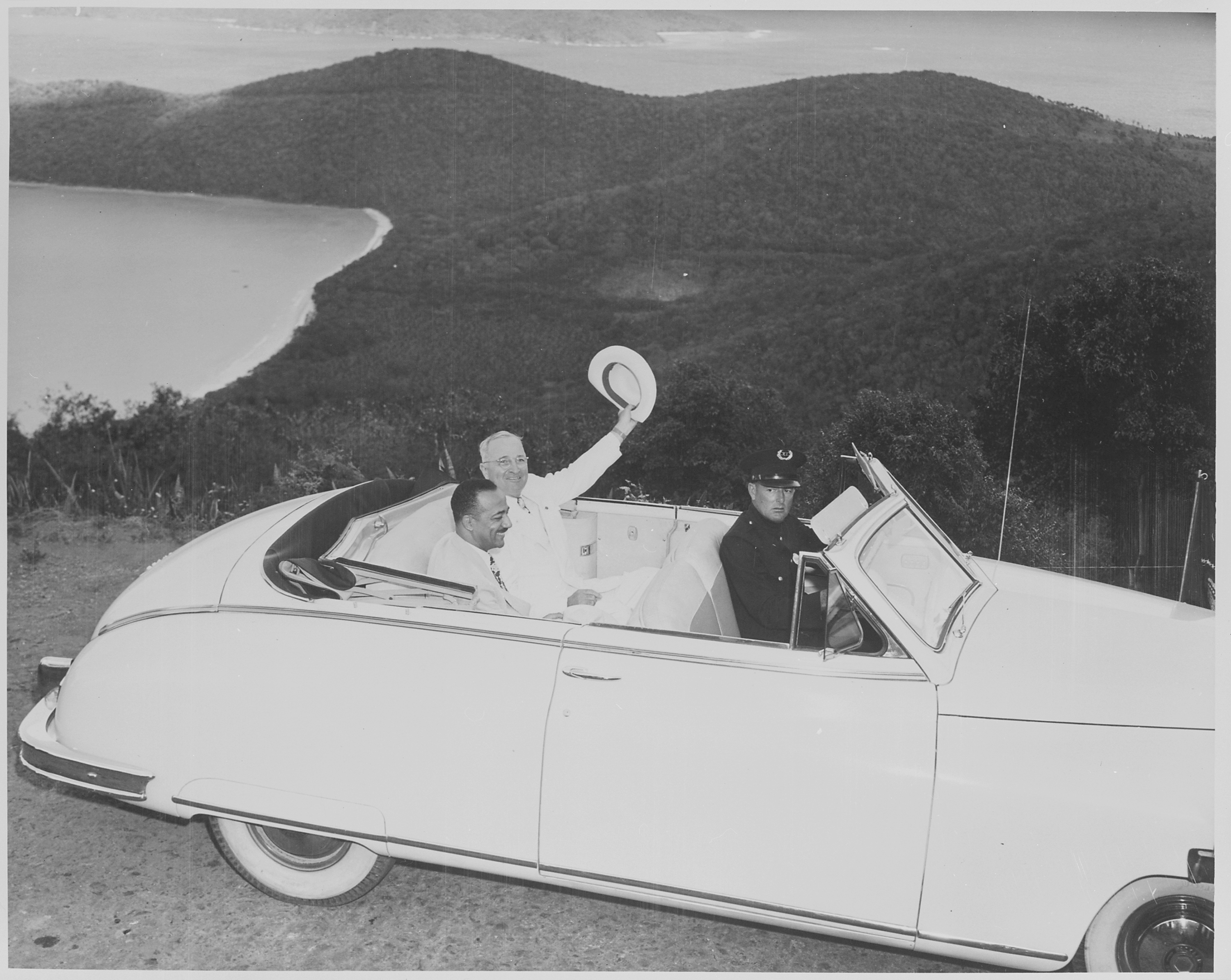
President Truman and Governor William H. Hastie on St. Thomas, February 22, 1948

Initially, the islands were overseen by an appointed governor who was selected by the president on the advice and consent of the senate. As the islands were under the control of the navy, the first seven governors of the islands were naval officers. Their first civilian governor, Paul Martin Pearson, was appointed by Herbert Hoover and inaugurated in 1931. On May 18, 1946, President Harry Truman appointed William H. Hastie as governor of the islands. Hastie thus became the first black governor in the United States.

A 1948 referendum which asked the population if they were in favor of a democratically elected governor failed, with 77% of voters against the proposal. Voters likely believed that a governor appointed by the federal government would have more influence in Washington and be able to advocate more effectively on their behalf than a locally elected official. Residents were granted the right to elect their own governor in 1968. Since 1972, the islands have been permitted to elect a non-voting delegate to Congress.

While the Danish West Indies had been purchased from Denmark in 1917, Water Island, off the coast of St. Thomas, remained under private administration by the East Asiatic Company. The Danish had first settled the island in the late 17th century. Amid growing fear that the company might be used as a front for a German naval base, the U.S. purchased the island on June 19, 1944, for $10,000. From 1944 to 1996, Water Island remained a federal property. Control of it was transferred to the United States Virgin Islands government on December 12, 1996, for $25 million. Archeological surveys conducted in 1998 identified several historical sites on the island, including the remains of pre-colonial shell middens, 18th- and 19th-century plantations, and a WWII fort.

=== Tourism and modern immigration ===
After the islands became a possession of the United States, they experienced a period of out-migration, wherein their population decreased by 16% between 1917 and 1930 under naval administration. Most emigrants from the Virgin Islands during this era relocated to the mainland United States. By the 1930s, the islands were faced with a labor shortage. The repeal of prohibition had increased demand for plantation workers and the construction of a submarine base on St. Thomas created new jobs while the islands were still faced with habitual out-migration. Labor shortages drew a large number of migrants from Puerto Rico. At the same time, thousands of seasonal migrants from the Lesser Antillies were employed on sugarcane plantations on St. Croix. Because the islands have a continuous history of migration, their population is highly diverse.

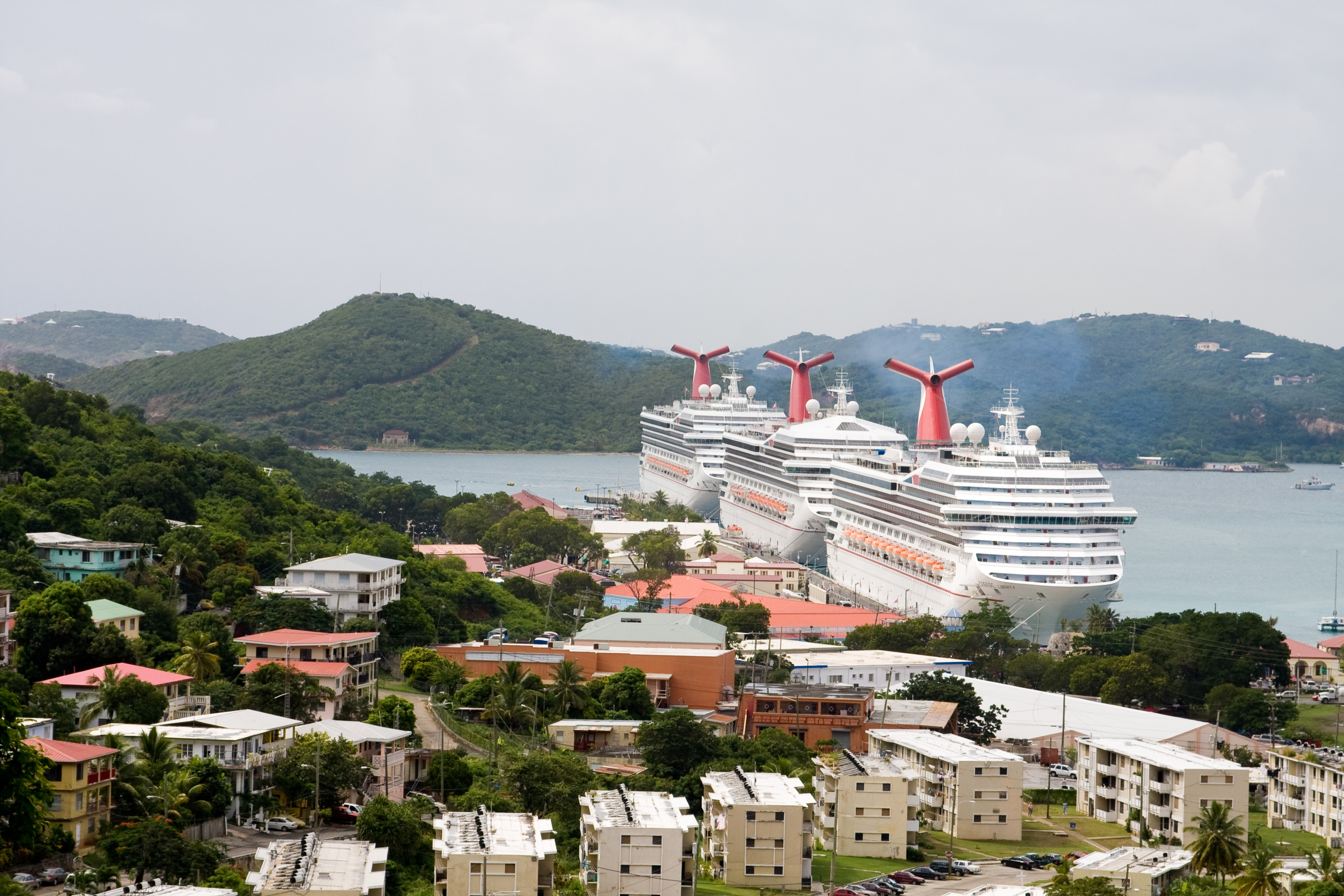
Cruise ships docked in St. Thomas, 2007

Up until the mid-20th century, the economy of the islands was tied to agriculture, trade, and the use of its harbors. During the 1960s the economy of the islands began to shift away from agriculture towards industrial production, partly as a result of the growth of the tourism sector. The travel restrictions imposed by the embargo against Cuba—which had been a major tourist destination among Americans—boosted tourism on other Caribbean islands. The dramatic increase in demand in the tourism industry created new labor demands on the islands, leading to an influx of English-speaking migrants from the Lesser Antillies.

Since the 1970s, the tourism industry has dominated life in the United States Virgin Islands. Tourism constitutes the largest industry of the islands. As of 2022, they have a permanent population of approximately 105,400 people, yet annually receive 2.5–3 million tourists, primarily from cruise ships.

== See also ==
- Outline of the United States Virgin Islands
- Danish West Indies
- History of the Caribbean
