= 1979 United States Virgin Islands constitutional referendum =

Ballot measure in the US Virgin Islands

6 March 1979

Results
Choice	Votes	%
Yes	4,696	43.96%
No	5,986	56.04%
Valid votes	10,682	100.00%
Invalid or blank votes	0	0.00%
Total votes	10,682	100.00%
Registered voters/turnout	27,732	38.52%

A constitutional referendum was held in the United States Virgin Islands on 6 March 1979. Federal law passed by the United States Congress authorized the Virgin Islands and Guam to pass constitutions and form governments. A Constitutional Council had subsequently been elected in the 1977 general elections. The Council wrote and then unanimously adopted a draft constitution which provided for an elected governor and treasurer, a 17-seat Legislature, a local justice system and protections for Virgin Islander culture.

The draft constitution was rejected by the voters in the referendum.

== Results ==
Choice	Votes	%
Approve new constitution	4,696	43.96
Reject new constitution	5,986	56.04
Invalid votes		–
Total	10,682	100
Registered voters/turnout	27,732	38.23
Source: Direct Democracy
