= Sugar production in the Danish West Indies =

Historical sugar production in the US Virgin Islands

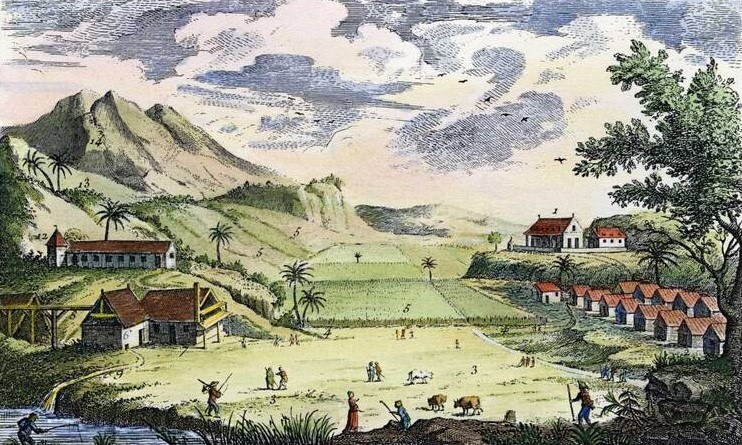
A typical sugar plantation in West Indies

Sugar production in the Danish West Indies, now the United States Virgin Islands, was an important part of the economy of the islands for over two hundred years. Long before the islands became part of the United States in 1917, the islands, in particular the island of Saint Croix, was exploited by the Danish from the early 18th century, and by 1800 over 30,000 acres were under cultivation, earning Saint Croix a reputation as the "Garden of the West Indies". Since the closing of the last sugar factory on Saint Croix in 1966, the industry has become only a memory.

== History ==
The island of Saint Croix has long been associated with sugar production and has been the dominant cash crop for the economy for over two hundred years. Due to its considerable accomplishments in agriculture, the island of Saint Croix became one of the wealthiest sugar producing islands and gained a reputation as "The Garden of the West Indies". The Caribbean island of Saint Croix in the United States Virgin Islands was a major sugar producing area from at least 1734 when the Danish West India and Guinea Company bought the islands from the French. The Danish colonists exploited the island, including the area around Belvedere on the north coast of the island from 1763. There is a historic sugar plantation located at Belvedere and sugar mill which was built by the Danish. When the Danes arrived on Saint Croix they found a number of British families raising cane and making rum. The Danes divided the islands into 150 and 300 acre plantations and into nine quarters but faced stiff competition from the British who at one point owned five times as many plantations as the Danish. Due to extremely low land costs and tax benefits, planters came to Saint Croix from the surrounding islands of St. Thomas, Tortola, Virgin Gorda, Montserrat and elsewhere and by 1755 the island had a population of over 10,000. Although the Danes almost went bankrupt in 1753, they steadily grew to dominate Saint Croix, operating 375 plantations not only cultivating sugar, but also cotton, indigo and tobacco. The sugar industry reached its peak between 1795 and 1800 after the Danes declared the slave trade in 1792 which ensured a plentiful supply of African labor, coinciding with high prices on the world market. At the peak of output in sugar production in the Virgin Islands at the close of the 18th century, more than 30,000 acres of Saint Croix were under sugar cultivation. The island of St. Croix contained nearly 150 sugar mills during this period; 115 of which are still standing today.

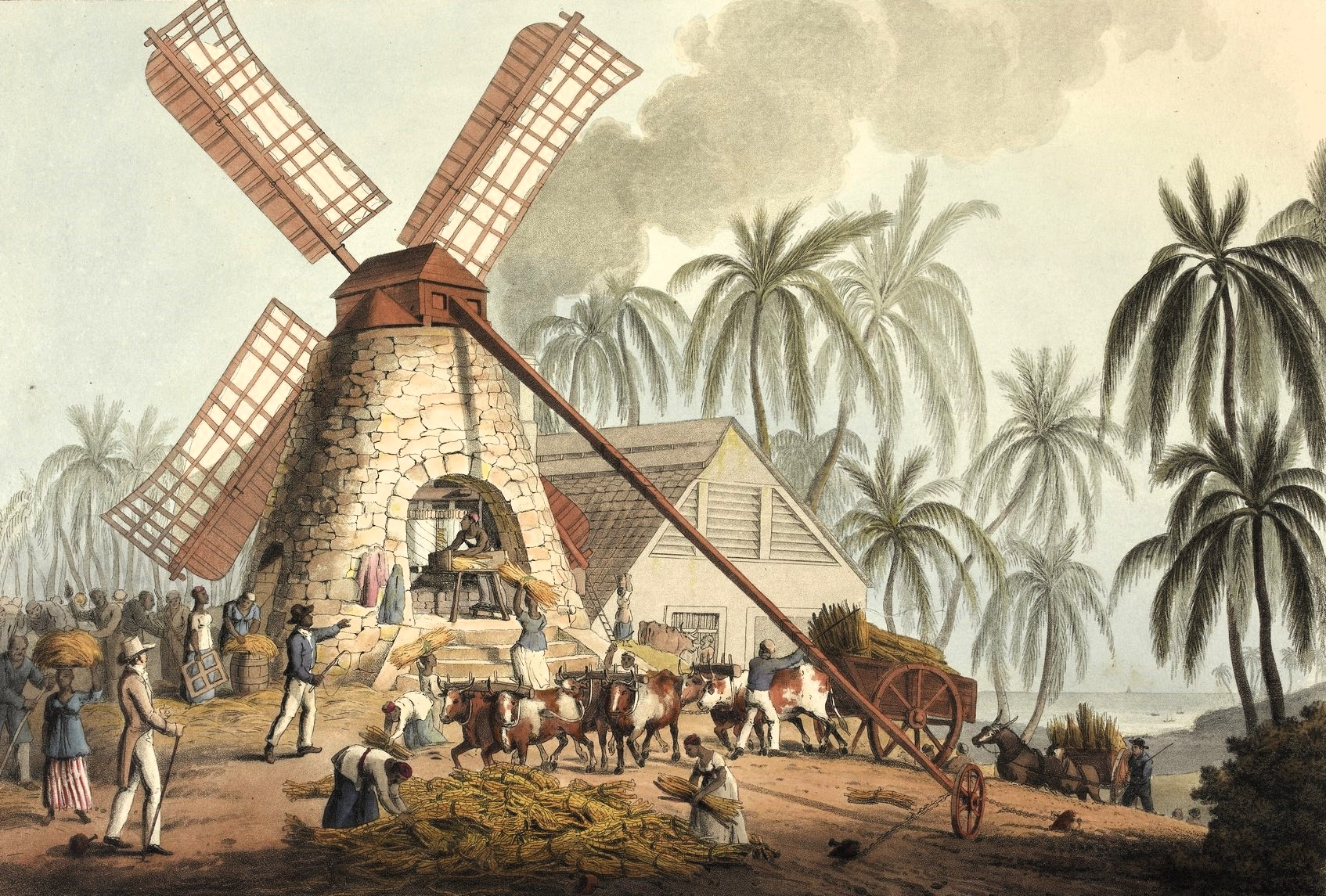
Sugar mill

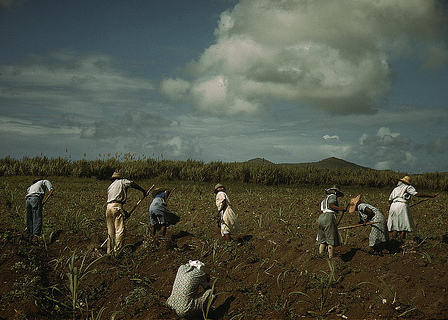
Sugar farmers in Bethlehem, Saint Croix in December 1941

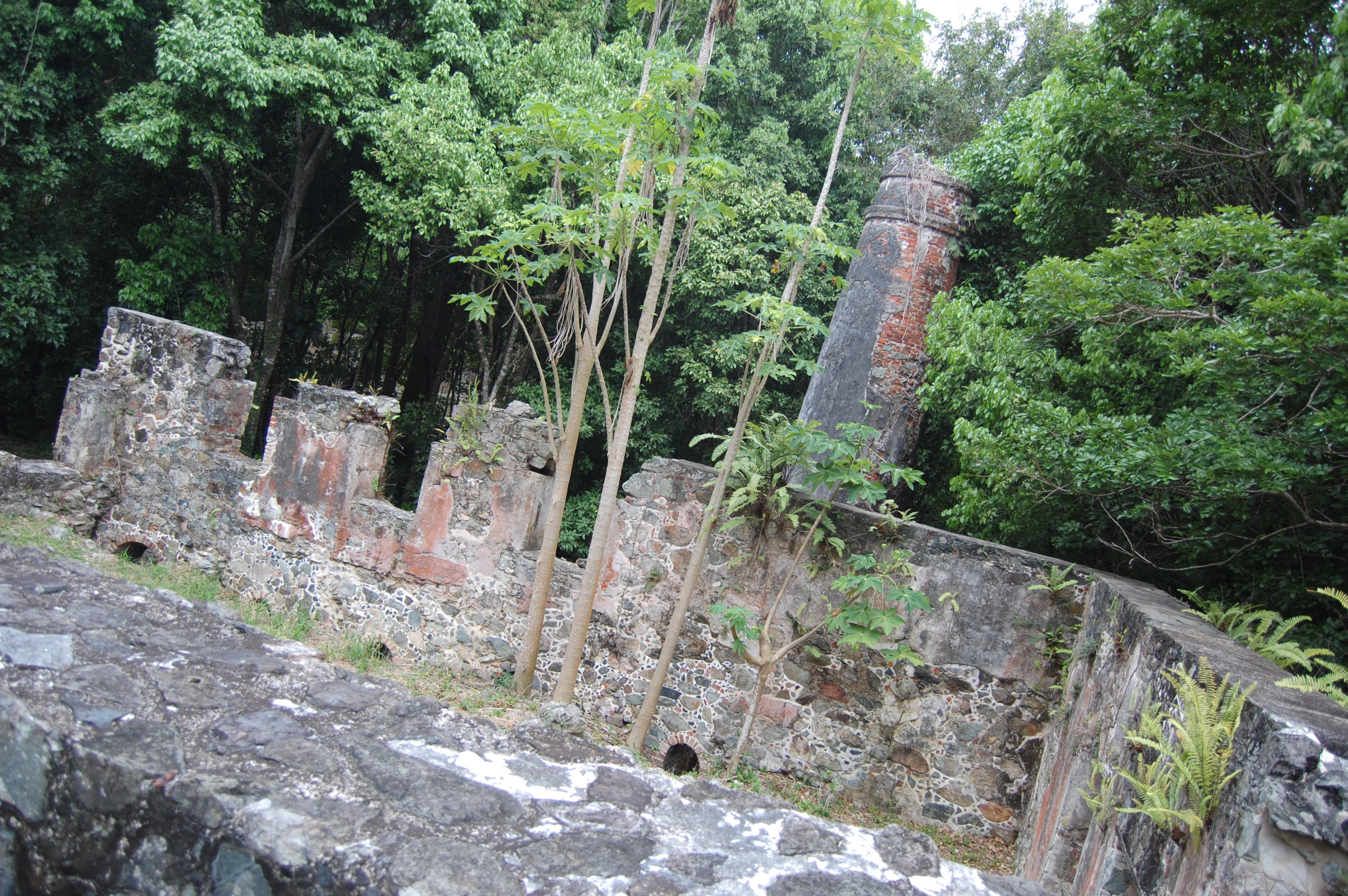
The ruined remains of a sugar mill in the US Virgin Islands

The Danish Crown formally abolished the transatlantic slave trade in 1803, but not the selling of slaves within the Virgin Islands, the statute prohibiting importation having been passed 11 years earlier. In the 19th century the sugar industry began to decline. However, it is evident that slaves continued to be used to propel the industry, even if illegally, as in 1848, Governor von Scholten freed the slaves on St. Croix, after rioting broke out. During the Napoleonic wars, the Danish were at odds with the British, snatching the island back off of them after a conflict in 1801 and again after the Napoleonic Wars in 1815. However, over the next few decades the economy declined miserably, with the sugar industry plagued by drought and coinciding with political and economic uncertainty in Europe, its most important market and after 1810 faced serious competition from beet sugar producers and from the East Indies. In the 1860s and 1870s a series of disasters deeply affected the sugar industry in St. Croix, with a major fire in Christiansted in February 1866, an earthquake and tsunami in 1867, and a major hurricane which destroyed crops and buildings in 1872. The same year, De Danske Sukkerfabrikker (the Danish Sugar Factories) were founded in Copenhagen, and were initially dependent on raw sugar from the Danish West Indies prior to focusing on beet sugar. In 1875, the Danish government funded a Central Sugar Factory on St. Croix in a bid to help the industry out of depression. However, prices continued to fall due to the increasing competition from beet sugar and from the East Indies. After the United States bought the islands in 1917, production diminished considerably. According to the 1930 census, only 5,823 acres (2,356 ha) were under sugar cultivation in 1929, and the annual yield was 56,400 tons as compared to 84,000 in 1917.

== See also ==
- Sugar plantations in the Caribbean
- Estate Rust Op Twist
