= 1972 United States Virgin Islands constitutional referendum =

- 7 November 1972
- Outcome: Failed due to insufficient turnout

Results
Choice	Votes	%
Yes	7,279	56.88%
No	5,518	43.12%

A constitutional referendum was held in the United States Virgin Islands on 7 November 1972. Federal law passed by the United States Congress suggested that a second Constitutional Convention be called after the failure of the previous proposed constitution.

Whilst the new constitution received a majority of votes in favor, turnout was too low and it did not enter into force.

== Results ==
Choice	Votes	%
For	7,279	56.88
Against	5,518	43.12
Total	12,797	100.00
Registered voters/turnout	21,641	–
Source: Direct Democracy
