= Kurt Vialet =

United States Virgin Islands politician

Majority Leader of the Legislature of the Virgin Islands
- Incumbent
- Assumed office January 13, 2025
- Preceded by: Kenneth Gittens

Member of the Virgin Islands Legislature from the St. Croix district
- Incumbent
- Assumed office January 13, 2025
- Preceded by: Diane T. Capehart
- In office January 12, 2015 – January 9, 2023
- Succeeded by: Diane T. Capehart

Personal details
- Born: Kurt Anthony Vialet; May 26, 1964 (age 62) St. Croix, Virgin Islands, U.S.
- Party: Democratic (before 2022, 2024–present); Independent (2022–2024)
- Spouse: Wanda Figueroa
- Children: 2
- Education: University of the Virgin Islands (BA, MA)

Kurt Anthony Vialet (born May 26, 1964) is an American politician and former educator who is a member of the Legislature of the Virgin Islands from St. Croix. He previously served from 2015 to 2023. Vialet ran as an independent candidate for governor in the 2022 election but lost to incumbent Governor Albert Bryan. Vialet won the 2024 senate election as the top vote getter on St. Croix.

== Early life and education ==
Kurt Vialet was born on May 26, 1964, in St. Croix to Roy Vialet from St. Thomas and Helena Matta-Vialet from Fajardo, Puerto Rico. He attended public school in the Virgin Islands where he graduated from St. Croix Central High School in 1982. Vialet attained his Bachelor of Arts in Mathematics from the University of the Virgin Islands and a Master of Arts in Administration and Supervision in 1992.

== Career ==
Immediately after graduation from the University of the Virgin Islands, Vialet began working at the Virgin Islands Department of Education. He has occupied the position of a Teacher and an Assistant Principal at the Elena L. Christian Junior High School, a Principal at the St. Croix Educational Complex High School and Principal of the Arthur A. Richards Junior High School. In August 1995, Vialet was given the duty of designing and structuring the St. Croix Educational Complex and became the first principal to open the island’s second high school.

== Political career ==
=== 2014 ===
A newcomer entering politics for the first time, Vialet topped number one with 3,184 votes in the August 2 Democratic primary. He maintained first place with 8,288 votes in the general election on November 4, 2014.

=== 2016 ===
Vialet secured first place in the Democratic primary with 1,544 votes. He went on to win re-election with 5,818 votes in the general election.

=== 2018 ===
Vialet came in fourth place behind of Senator Novelle Francis Jr., who tied 1,842 votes with him.

=== 2020 ===
Vialet retained his number one spot while receiving 4,421 votes.

=== 2022 ===
Vialet did not run for reelection to the Legislature of the Virgin Islands, and ran for Governor of the United States Virgin Islands, ultimately losing to incumbent Governor Albert Bryan Jr.

=== 2024 ===
Vialet announced a run to return to the Legislature of the Virgin Islands. In the St. Croix Democratic Primary, he was the highest vote getter, receiving 1,233 votes. In the General Election, Vialet was the highest vote getter in the St. Croix District, receiving 4,825 votes.

=== Personal life ===
Vialet is married to Wanda Figueroa and they have two daughters, Kurrisa and Kyminis Vialet.

Legislature of the Virgin Islands
Preceded by Kenneth Gittens	Majority Leader of the Virgin Islands Legislature; 2025–present	Incumbent
