= 2022 United States Virgin Islands gubernatorial election =

- November 8, 2022
- Registered: 39,910
- Turnout: 56.52%
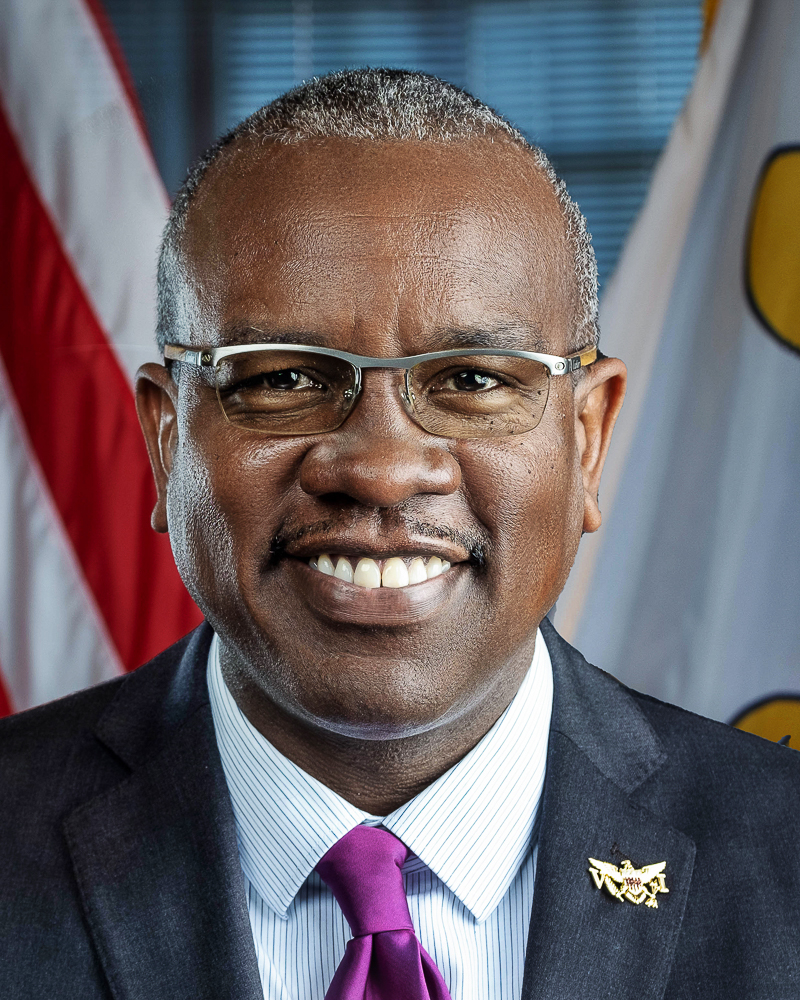
Nominee	Albert Bryan	Kurt Vialet
Party	Democratic	Independent
Running mate	Tregenza Roach	Janelle Sarauw
Popular vote	12,157	8,244
Percentage	56.14%	38.07%
- Results by district Bryan: Vialet
Governor before election
Albert Bryan
Democratic
Elected Governor
Albert Bryan
Democratic

The 2022 U.S. Virgin Islands gubernatorial election took place on November 8, 2022, to elect the governor of the United States Virgin Islands. The election was held concurrently with the 2022 United States midterm elections.

Incumbent Democratic governor Albert Bryan won a second four-year term in office, receiving 56% of the vote. He defeated Independent candidate and territorial senator Kurt Vialet, independent activist Ronald Pickard, and former senator Stephen Frett of the Independent Citizens Movement.

== Democratic primary ==
=== Candidates ===
- Governor: Albert Bryan, incumbent Governor
  - Lieutenant Governor: Tregenza Roach, incumbent Lieutenant Governor

==== Defeated in primary ====
- Kent Bernier Sr.
  - Oakland Benta, former Virgin Islands Senator

The 2022 Democratic primary for governor was held on August 6, 2022. Incumbents Governor Albert Bryan and Lieutenant Governor Tregenza Roach were challenged by Kent Bernier Sr. and his running mate, Oakland Benta. Early voting took place July 18 through August 1, 2022. On election night, unofficial results indicated Bryan won the nomination with 4,016 votes over Bernier, who received 2,146 votes.

=== Debates ===
The Democratic Party of the Virgin Islands scheduled a gubernatorial forum with WTJX for July 14, 2022. Three days prior, the Bernier-Benta team withdrew from the forum and insisted a debate with Bryan and Roach.

=== Endorsements ===
Albert Bryan

Organizations

- Democratic Governors Association
- Democratic Party of the Virgin Islands
- West End Democratic Club

Individuals

- Donna Christian-Christensen, former Delegate to the U.S. House of Representatives (1997-2015)

=== Polling ===
Poll source	Date(s) administered	Sample size	Margin of error	Albert Bryan (D)	Kent Bernier (D)	None
I AM LLC	June 5, 2022	752	±3.53	61%	23%	15%
I AM LLC	June 30, 2022	752	±3.53	59%	24%	15%

=== Results ===
==== Territorial ====
Candidate	Running mate	Party	Votes	%
Albert Bryan Jr.	Tregenza Roach	Democratic	4,269	65.04
Kent Bernier Sr.	Oakland Benta	Democratic	2,255	34.35
Write in			40	0.61
Total			6,564	100.00

==== St. Croix ====
Candidate	Running mate	Party	Votes	%
Albert Bryan Jr.	Tregenza Roach	Democratic	1,656	53.33
Kent Bernier Sr.	Oakland Benta	Democratic	1,432	46.12
Write in			17	0.55
Total			3,105	100.00

==== St. Thomas/St. John ====
Candidate	Running mate	Party	Votes	%
Albert Bryan Jr.	Tregenza Roach	Democratic	2,613	75.54
Kent Bernier Sr.	Oakland Benta	Democratic	823	23.79
Write in			23	0.66
Total			3,459	100.00

==== By precinct ====
Precinct	Bryan	Bernier	Write-in	Total
Alexander Henderson	178	178	—	356
Claude O. Markoe	98	129	5	232
Evelyn M. Williams	141	158	2	301
Eulalie R. Rivera	81	95	1	177
Alfredo Andrews	60	47	1	108
St. Croix Educational Complex	121	125	2	248
Ricardo Richards	174	128	1	303
Lew Muckle	135	127	2	264
Juanita Gardine	183	125	—	308
John F. Kennedy Terrace	41	39	1	81
Elena L. Christian	159	99	2	260
Pearl B. Larsen	173	72	—	245
Florence Williams Library	57	48	—	105
Ivanna Eudora Kean	128	38	—	166
Joseph A. Gomez	200	54	1	255
Bertha C. Boschulte	136	50	4	190
CAHS Gym	278	113	3	394
Oswald Harris Court	53	18	1	72
Winston Raymo Rec. Center	126	48	—	174
Gladys A. Abraham	430	121	2	553
Addelita Cancryn	346	126	5	477
Joseph Sibilly	242	62	1	305
Charles W. Turnbull Regional Library	401	114	3	518
Julius E. Sprauve	106	34	3	143
Guy Benjamin	13	2	—	15
STX Absentee	55	50	—	105
STX Provisional	—	—	—	—
STT/STJ Absentee	127	32	—	159
STT/STJ Provisional	—	—	—	—

== General election ==
The general election was held on November 8, 2022, with incumbent governor Albert Bryan facing three candidates: St. Croix Senator Kurt Vialet, former police officer Ronald Pickard, and former senator Stephen Frett. Early voting started October 10 and ran through October 31, 2022.

Another divisive election, Sarauw again faced questions about her tenure at CAHS as a teacher, which was mentioned during her 2016 senatorial bid. She pushed back by stating the reprimand letter was for being the most inspiring teacher during the 2009–2010 school year, and an honor from the Middle States Association and any unbecoming behavior she may have exhibited during her tenure as an educator at CAHS, could also be attributed to her age, 21 at the time. "I was 21, I was a baby. I was 21 then, I'm making 37 in two days, and people grow, evolve and they mature."

At a virtual campaign rally, Bryan supporter & Calypsonian King Derby referred to Sarauw as "he/she" and Vialet as "that long-neck fella." The commentary drew outcry from the community, which led to Bryan apologizing days later.

On election day, incumbents Governor Albert Bryan and Lieutenant Governor Tregenza Roach won 12,157 votes (56.14%), while their closest rivals, Kurt Vialet and Janelle Sarauw, received 8,244 votes (38.07%). Election results were certified a few days later. In December 2022, the FBI conducted an investigation into the 2022 election vote count following complaints.

The Bryan-Roach campaign was fined $2,000 by the Elections System for fundraising with Dominica Prime Minister Roosevelt Skerrit on September 27, 2022.

=== Debates ===
2022 AARP VI & WTJX gubernatorial forum
No.	Date	Host	Moderator	Link	Participants		
P Participant A Absent N Non-invitee I Invitee W Withdrawn							
P Participant A Absent N Non-invitee I Invitee W Withdrawn					Albert Bryan	Kurt Vialet	Ronald Pickard
1	October 1, 2022	WTJX-TV	LaVerne E. Ragster, Susan V. Ellis	PBS	P	P	P

2022 Virgin Islands Consortium & WTJX lieutenant gubernatorial debate
No.	Date	Host	Moderator	Link	Participants	
P Participant A Absent N Non-invitee I Invitee W Withdrawn						
P Participant A Absent N Non-invitee I Invitee W Withdrawn					Tregenza Roach	Janelle Sarauw
1	October 10, 2022	WTJX-TV	Ernice Gilbert	PBS	P	P

2022 Virgin Islands Consortium & WTJX gubernatorial debate
No.	Date	Host	Moderator	Link	Participants	
P Participant A Absent N Non-invitee I Invitee W Withdrawn						
P Participant A Absent N Non-invitee I Invitee W Withdrawn					Albert Bryan	Kurt Vialet
1	October 13, 2022	WTJX-TV	Ernice Gilbert	PBS	P	P

=== Endorsements ===
Albert Bryan (D)
- Jaime Harrison, Chair of the Democratic National Committee (2021–2025)
- Pedro Pierluisi, Governor of Puerto Rico (2021–2025)
- Roosevelt Skerrit, Prime Minister of Dominica (2004-present)
Kurt Vialet (I)
- Cedric Armstrong, owner of Armstrong Ice Cream
- Dr. Brittany Dawson, certified nurse‐midwife
- Nereida Rivera-O'Reilly, former St. Croix Senator (2009–2019)

=== Polling ===
Poll source	Date(s) administered	Respondents	Sample size	Margin of error	Kurt Vialet (I)	Albert Bryan (D)	Stephen Frett (ICM)	Ronald Pickard (I)	Undecided None
I AM LLC	May 10, 2022	Territorial	400	–	29%	33%	–	9%	16%
I AM LLC	May 10, 2022	St. Croix	400	–	44%	20%			
I AM LLC	May 10, 2022	St. Thomas/St. John	400	–	14%	46%			
VI Tech Stack	September 7–13, 2022	Territorial	± 3.82%	650	25%	48%	1%	1%	23%
VI Tech Stack	September 7–13, 2022	St. Thomas/St. John	400	± 4.86%	18%	58%	0%	1%	21%
VI Tech Stack	September 7–13, 2022	St. Croix	250	± 6.17%	34%	37%	0%	1%	25%
I AM LLC	October 31, 2022	Territorial	423	± 4.74%	44%	40%	4%	0%	10%
I AM LLC	October 31, 2022	St. Croix	224	± 6.53%	46%	42%	6%	1%	3%
I AM LLC	October 31, 2022	St. Thomas	199	± 6.92%	38%	38%	3%	0%	19%
I AM LLC	October 31, 2022	St. John	199	± 6.92%	66%	22%	0%	0%	11%

Poll source	School district	Date(s) administered	Vialet / Sarauw	Bryan / Roach	Pickard / Turnbull	Frett / Miller
IEKHS	St. Thomas/St. John	October 21, 2022	167	155	87	46
CAHS	St. Thomas/St. John	October 21–25, 2022	185	173	79	29
St. Croix Educational Complex	St. Croix	October 21, 2022	283	120	16	42
St. Croix Central High School	St. Croix	October 28, 2022	279	226	23	38
Lew Muckle Elementary School	St. Croix	—	53	26	6	0

== Results ==
Candidate	Running mate	Party	Votes	%
Albert Bryan Jr.	Tregenza Roach	Democratic Party	12,157	56.14
Kurt Vialet	Janelle K. Sarauw	Independent	8,244	38.07
Stephen "Smokey" Frett	Gregory R. Miller Jr.	Independent Citizens Movement	740	3.42
Ronald Pickard	Elroy Turnbull	Independent	243	1.12
Write in			272	1.26
Total			21,656	100.00
Total votes			22,557	–
Registered voters/turnout			39,910	56.52

=== By district ===
District	Bryan (D)	Vialet (I)	Frett (I)	Pickard (I)	Write-in	Total
St. Croix	4,502 (43.35%)	5,378 (51.79%)	213 (2.05%)	126 (1.21%)	166 (1.6%)	10,385
St. Thomas/St. John	7,042 (68.48%)	2,548 (24.78%)	492 (4.78%)	112 (1.09%)	90 (0.88%)	10,284

=== By precinct ===
- Note: Pearl B. Larsen precinct flipped from Independent to Democratic. While Guy Benjamin precinct flipped from Democratic hold to Independent for the first time.

Precinct	Bryan	Vialet	Frett	Pickard	Write-in	Total
Alexander Henderson	428	587	37	12	21	1,085
Claude O. Markoe	292	442	30	12	20	796
Evelyn Williams	421	529	9	11	33	1,003
Eulalie R. Rivera	285	399	10	8	8	710
Alfredo Andrews	205	231	6	8	3	450
St. Croix Educational Complex	376	544	33	10	20	983
Ricardo Richards	492	473	13	9	12	999
Lew Muckle	338	510	18	14	8	888
Juanita Gardine	442	483	17	16	10	968
John F. Kennedy Terrace	117	165	1	4	4	291
Elena L. Christian	455	494	15	5	9	978
Pearl B. Larsen	516	321	14	8	8	867
Florence A. Williams Library	157	181	10	9	10	367
Ivanna Eudora Kean	435	143	29	5	4	616
Joseph A. Gomez	497	169	33	6	4	709
Bertha C. Boschulte	438	148	31	11	3	631
CAHS Gymnasium	739	242	61	18	9	1,069
Oswald Harris Court	156	87	18	4	2	267
Winston Raymo Rec. Center	357	110	26	6	10	509
Gladys Abraham	1,066	352	64	12	18	1,512
Addelita Cancryn	1,023	350	98	19	16	1,506
Joseph Sibilly	767	258	34	9	8	1,076
Charles W. Turnbull Library	1,145	367	81	16	16	1,625
Julius E. Sprauve	360	230	14	2	0	606
Guy Benjamin	59	92	3	4	0	158
STX Absentee	165	204	6	2	4	381
STT/STJ Absentee	397	91	28	2	11	529
STT/STJ Provisional	51	23	1	1	1	77
