= Lists of school districts in the United States =

School district

These are lists of school districts in the United States.

== States ==
- Alabama
- Alaska
- Arizona
- Arkansas
- California
- Colorado
- Connecticut
- Delaware
- Florida
- Georgia
- Idaho
- Illinois
- Indiana
- Iowa
- Kansas
- Kentucky
- Louisiana
- Maine
- Maryland
- Massachusetts
- Michigan
- Minnesota
- Mississippi
- Missouri
- Montana
- Nebraska
- Nevada
- New Hampshire
- New Jersey
- New Mexico
- New York
- North Carolina
- North Dakota
- Ohio
- Oklahoma
- Oregon
- Pennsylvania
- Rhode Island
- South Carolina
- South Dakota
- Tennessee
- Texas
- Utah
- Vermont
- Virginia
- Washington
- West Virginia
- Wisconsin
- Wyoming

There is one provider of public education in the State of Hawaii, the Hawaii Department of Education (HIDOE), dependent on the Hawaiian state government. The word "school districts" in Hawaii is instead used to refer to internal divisions within HIDOE, and the U.S. Census Bureau does not count these as local governments.

=== District of Columbia ===
- District of Columbia: District of Columbia Public Schools

== Insular areas ==
- American Samoa: American Samoa Department of Education
- Guam: Guam Department of Education
- Northern Mariana Islands: Commonwealth of the Northern Mariana Islands Public School System
- Puerto Rico: Puerto Rico Department of Education
- List of school districts in the United States Virgin Islands

== Student population ==
- List of the largest school districts in the United States by enrollment
