= Ronald Pickard =

American swimmer (born 1969)

Personal information
- Born: August 23, 1969 (age 57) St. Croix, U.S. Virgin Islands, U.S.
- Education: Saint Leo University
- Height: 190 cm (6 ft 3 in)
- Weight: 74 kg (163 lb)

Sport
- Sport: Swimming

Ronald Pickard (born August 23, 1969) is a swimmer who represented the United States Virgin Islands at three events during the 1988 Summer Olympics. He ran for governor and a seat in the United States House of Representatives in the 2022 and 2024 elections.

== Early life and athletics ==
Ronald Pickard was born in Christiansted, U.S. Virgin Islands, on August 23, 1969, to Mary Ann Pickard. His mother and sister served in the Legislature of the Virgin Islands. He graduated from the West Indies Academy.

At the 1986 World Aquatics Championships and 1987 Pan American Games Pickard participated in swimming events. At the 1988 Summer Olympics Pickard participated in three swimming events as part of the Virgin Islands team. He placed 13th in the 4 x 200 metre freestyle relay, 47th in the 50 metre freestyle, and 58th in the 100 metre freestyle. He signed onto the swimming team of Alabama A&M University in 1988, but could not come to school for the first three weeks due to the Olympics.

== Criminal trial ==
Pickard and Dean Bates, both members of the United States Virgin Islands Police Department, were charged with the May 10, 1999, alleged rape of a nightclub dancer. In August, a grand jury indicted Pickard and Bates on sixteen counts of first-degree rape, civil rights violations, and firearms violations. Bates and Pickard's civil rights violations dated back to December 1996. Another grand jury indicted Bates, Pickard, Victor Suarez, and Renaldo Philbert on fifteen counts of assault and intimidation of witnesses in February 2000. However, eight of the charges were dropped due to the statute of limitations ending.

On July 26, 2000, a jury ruled Suarez not guilty on all charges, Bates found guilty on four charges, Philbert found guilty on three charges, and Pickard found guilty on seven charges. Pickard and Bates were found not guilty on the two charges of rape. On July 5, 2001, Pickard was sentenced to serve 8 years and 10 months.

During their prison sentence Pickard, Bates, and Philbert were accused of trying to arrange the murder of a FBI agent and his family. Pickard served ten years of his sentence in a federal prison. After leaving prison he graduated from Saint Leo University with a bachelor's degree and master's degree. He attempted to enter a law school in Georgia, but family issues prevented him.

Pickard later stated that the police department was corrupt and had more mobsters than the mafia. He claimed that he was set up for opposing corruption in the department.

== Politics ==
Pickard was initially a member of the Democratic Party and once chaired the Young Democrats of America, but later joined the Republican Party. He was a member of the U.S. Virgin Islands' delegation to the 2024 Republican National Convention.

On July 24, 2022, Pickard announced that he would run for governor in the 2022 election as an independent candidate with Elroy Turnbull as his running mate. Democratic nominee Albert Bryan Jr. won the election while Pickard and Turnbull placed fourth. Pickard filed a complaint to the Virgin Islands Elections System accusing people of being paid to register to vote and purchasing of votes.

Pickard was the Republican nominee for the United States Virgin Islands' at-large congressional district in the 2024 election. He lost to Democratic nominee Stacey Plaskett. During the election he raised $19,683 and spent $18,463.

== Electoral history ==
Electoral history of Kurt Wright
Year	Office	Party	Primary			General			Result	Ref.
Year	Office	Party	Total	%	P.	Total	%	P.	Result	Ref.
2022	Governor of the United States Virgin Islands	Independent	No primary			243	1.12%	4th	Lost	
2024	United States House of Representatives (USVI at-large)	Republican	No primary			1,311	9.63%	3rd	Lost	

== Works cited ==
=== News ===
- "3 Cops Get Prison For Civil-Rights Violations". St. John Source. July 5, 2001. Archived from the original on May 30, 2026.
- "Cop Rape Case: Time Runs Out On 8 Counts". St. John Source. April 20, 2000. Archived from the original on May 30, 2026.
- "Jury Convicts Three of Four St. Croix Cops". St. John Source. July 27, 2000. Archived from the original on May 30, 2026.
- "Jury Still Out in Trial of Cops". St. John Source. July 26, 2000. Archived from the original on May 30, 2026.
- "Pickard Mounts Campaign Against Son's Rape Indictment". St. John Source. August 5, 1999. Archived from the original on May 30, 2026.
- "Snitches, Hits and the Almighty Latin Kings". St. John Source. July 6, 2001. Archived from the original on May 30, 2026.
- Carlson, Suzanne (November 22, 2022). "Elections System reviewing complaints from unsuccessful candidates". The Virgin Islands Daily News. Archived from the original on November 23, 2022.
- Lee, Bethaney (July 27, 2022). "Pickard believes his past makes him keenly aware of and fixing V.I. pitfalls". The Virgin Islands Daily News. Archived from the original on August 7, 2022.
- McCarthy, John (July 20, 2024). "Virgin Islands Republican Party leaves Milwaukee confident of victory in November". Virgin Islands Free Press. Archived from the original on May 30, 2026.
- Terry, Yvonne (August 25, 1988). "Swimming is back at Alabama A&M". The Huntsville Times. p. 3C – via Newspapers.com.

=== Web ===
- "Governor and Lieutenant Governor • Territory of U.S. Virgin Islands". Election System of the Virgin Islands. Archived from the original on May 30, 2026.
- "Ronald Pickard". Ballotpedia. Archived from the original on May 30, 2026.
- "Ronald Pickard". International Olympic Committee. Archived from the original on May 30, 2026.
- "Ronald Pickard". Olympedia. Archived from the original on May 30, 2026.
- "Ronald Pickard". World Aquatics Championships. Archived from the original on May 30, 2026.
- "U.S. House • Congressional District U.S. Virgin Islands". Election System of the Virgin Islands. Archived from the original on May 30, 2026.
