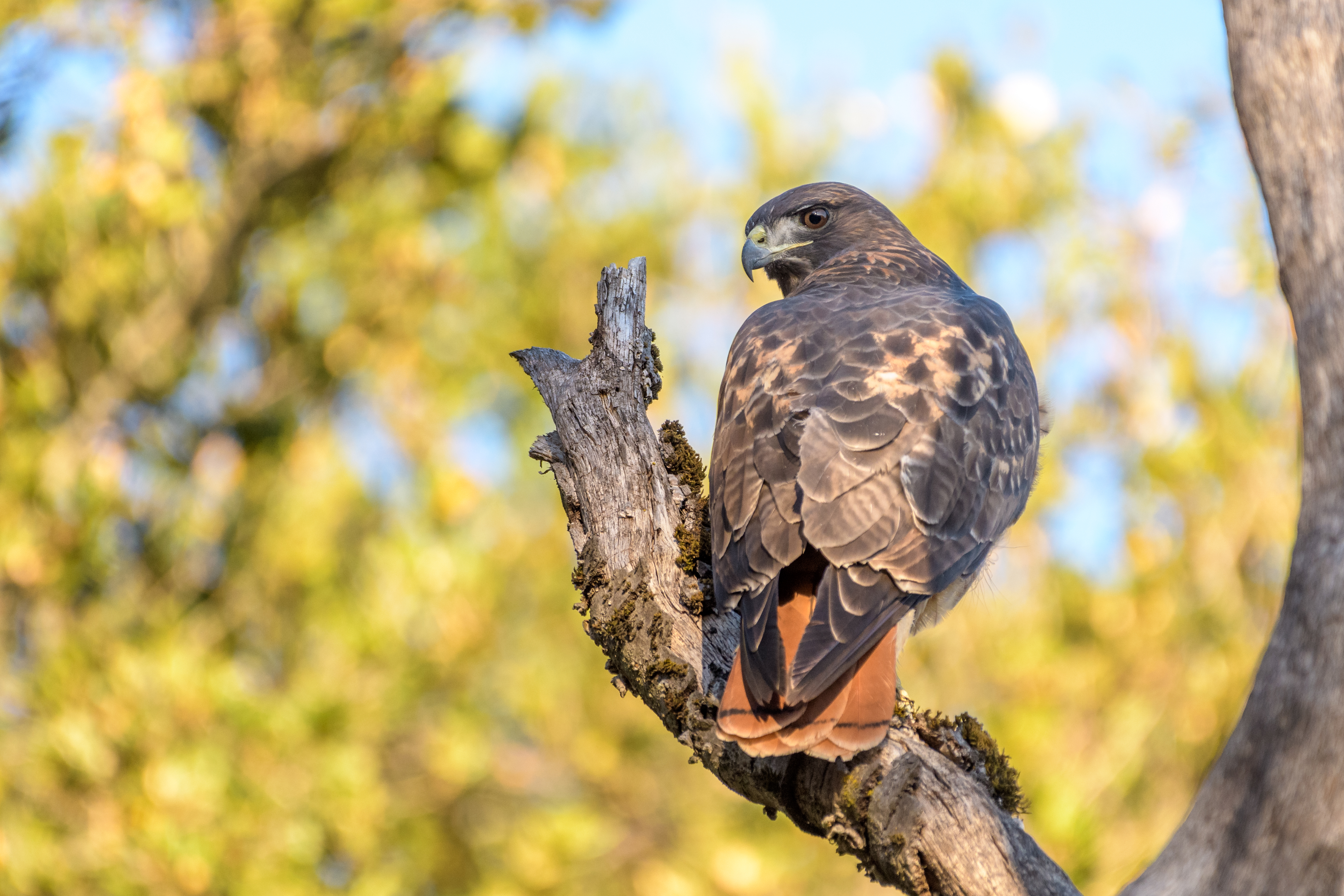
- Adult in Contra Costa County, California

Conservation status
- Least Concern (IUCN 3.1)

Scientific classification
- Kingdom: Animalia
- Phylum: Chordata
- Class: Aves
- Order: Accipitriformes
- Family: Accipitridae
- Genus: Buteo
- Species: B. jamaicensis

Binomial name
- Buteo jamaicensis (Gmelin, 1788)

Synonyms
- Buteo borealis; Buteo broealis (lapsus); Falco borealis Gmelin; Falco harlani Audubon; Falco jamaicensis Gmelin

Audio
- Red-tailed hawk call

= Red-tailed hawk =

Species of bird

The red-tailed hawk (Buteo jamaicensis) is a bird of prey and one of the most common hawks in North America. In the United States, it is one of three species colloquially known as the "chickenhawk". The red-tailed hawk breeds throughout most of the continent, from western Alaska and northern Canada to as far south as Panama and the West Indies. The red-tailed hawk occupies a wide range of habitats and altitudes, including deserts, grasslands, coniferous and deciduous forests, agricultural fields, and urban areas. It is absent in areas of unbroken forest and in the high arctic. It is legally protected in Canada, Mexico, and the United States by the Migratory Bird Treaty.

The red-tailed hawk is one of the largest members of the genus Buteo in North America, typically weighing from 690 to 1,600 g (1.5 to 3.5 lb) and measuring 45–65 cm (18–26 in) in length, with a wingspan from 110–145 cm (43–57 in). Females are about 25% heavier than males. It has a stocky body with broad wings and can be distinguished from other North American hawks by the eponymous tail, which is uniformly brick-red above and light buff-orange below. The species feeds on a wide range of small animals, such as rodents, birds, and reptiles. Pairs stay together for life, taking a new mate only when the original mate dies. The pair constructs a stick nest in a high tree, in which a clutch of one to three eggs is laid.

The 14 recognized subspecies vary in appearance and range. The subspecies Harlan's hawk (B. j. harlani) is sometimes considered a separate species (B. harlani). Because they are so common and easily trained as capable hunters, most hawks captured for falconry in the United States are red-tailed hawks. The feathers and other parts of the red-tailed hawk are considered sacred to many American indigenous people.

== Taxonomy ==
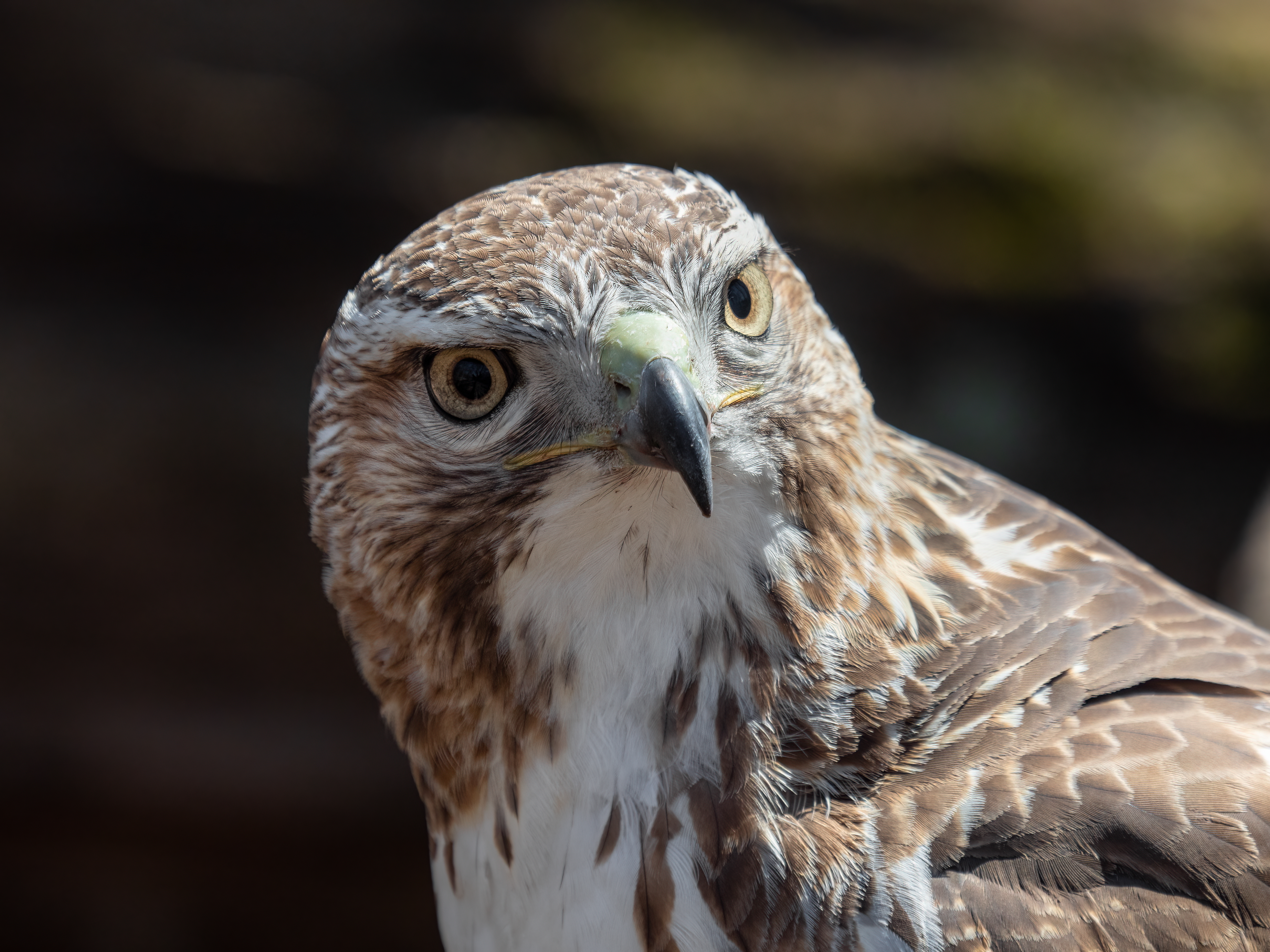
Close-up of an adult head

The red-tailed hawk was scientifically described in 1788 by German naturalist Johann Friedrich Gmelin under the name Falco jamaicensis. Gmelin based his description on the "cream-coloured buzzard" described in 1781 by John Latham in his A General Synopsis of Birds, based on a specimen from Jamaica that a friend had sent to him. The red-tailed hawk is one of 28 species in the genus Buteo, which was named by French naturalist Bernard Germain de Lacépède in 1799. Members of the genus Buteo are medium-sized raptors with robust bodies and broad wings. They are known as "buzzards" in Europe, but as "hawks" in North America.

The genus name Buteo is derived from the Latin būteō meaning 'buzzard'. The specific name jamaicensis refers to the island of Jamaica, which derives from the Taíno word Xaymaca meaning 'land of woods and water'. "Red-tailed hawk" is the official English common name designated by the International Ornithologists' Union. In the United States, the red-tailed hawk is one of three species colloquially known as the "chickenhawk", though it rarely preys on adult chickens.

The at least 14 recognized subspecies of Buteo jamaicensis vary in range and coloration: The subspecies Harlan's hawk (B. j. harlani) is sometimes considered a separate species (B. harlani).

- B. j. jamaicensis, the nominate subspecies, occurs in the northern West Indies.
- B. j. alascensis breeds (probably resident) from southeastern coastal Alaska to Haida Gwaii and Vancouver Island in British Columbia.
- B. j. borealis group (eastern red-tailed hawk) breeds from southeast Canada and Maine south through eastern Texas and east to northern Florida. It winters from southern Ontario east to southern Maine and south to the Gulf coast and Florida.
- B. j. calurus breeds from central interior Alaska, through western Canada south to Baja California. It winters from southwestern British Columbia southwest to Guatemala and northern Nicaragua. Paler individuals of northern Mexico may lack the dark wing marking.
- B. j. costaricensis is resident from Nicaragua to Panama. This subspecies is dark brown above with cinnamon flanks, wing linings and sides, and some birds have rufous underparts. The chest is much less heavily streaked than in northern migrants (B. j. calurus) to Central America.
- B. j. fuertesi breeds from northern Chihuahua to southern Texas. It winters in Arizona, New Mexico, and southern Louisiana. The belly is unstreaked or only lightly streaked, and the tail is pale.
- B. j. fumosus, Islas Marías, Mexico
- B. j. hadropus, Mexican Highlands
- B. j. harlani, is markedly different from all other red-tails. In both color morphs, the plumage is blackish and white, lacking warm tones (save the tail). The tail may be reddish, dusky, whitish, or gray and can be longitudinally streaked, mottled, or barred. Shorter primaries result in wingtips that don't reach the tail in perched birds. It breeds in Alaska and northwestern Canada and winters from Nebraska and Kansas to Texas and northern Louisiana. This population may well be a separate species.
- B. j. kemsiesi is a dark subspecies resident from Chiapas to Nicaragua. The dark wing marking may not be distinct in paler birds.
- B. j. kriderii is paler than other red-tails, especially on the head; the tail may be pinkish or white. In the breeding season, it occurs from southern Alberta, southern Saskatchewan, southern Manitoba, and extreme western Ontario south to south-central Montana, Wyoming, western Nebraska, and western Minnesota. In winter, it occurs from South Dakota and southern Minnesota south to Arizona, New Mexico, Texas, and Louisiana.
- B. j. socorroensis, Socorro Island, Mexico
- B. j. solitudinus, Bahamas and Cuba
- B. j. umbrinus occurs year-round in peninsular Florida north to Tampa Bay and the Kissimmee Prairie. It is similar in appearance to B. j. calurus.

== Description ==
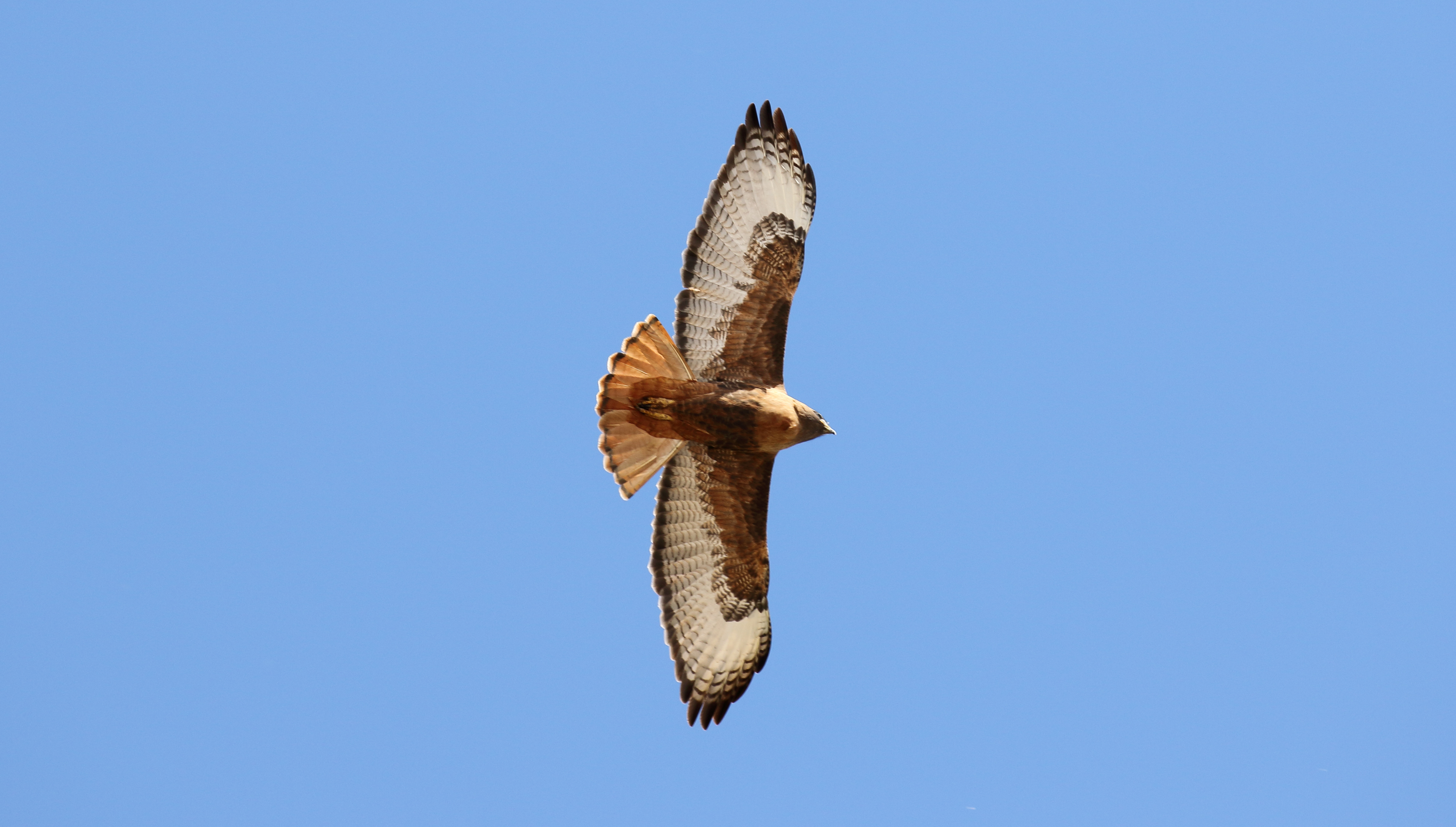
In flight, showing the red tail

Red-tailed hawk hovers in the wind

The red-tailed hawk is dimorphic in size, as females are up to 25% larger than males. As is typical in large raptors, frequently reported mean body mass for red-tailed hawks is somewhat higher than expansive research reveals. Part of this weight is highly seasonally variable and due to clinal variation; male red-tailed hawks may weigh from 690 to 1,300 g (1.52 to 2.87 lb) and females from 900 to 2,000 g (2.0 to 4.4 lb). Nine studies occurring at migration sites in the United States and two breeding studies, one from the smallest race in Puerto Rico, the other from larger races in Wisconsin, show that males weigh 837 g (1.845 lb) and females weigh 1,040.7 g (2.294 lb) on average, about 15% lighter than prior species-wide published weights. The heaviest surveyed weights came from migrants in Cape May, New Jersey, where females averaged 1,278 g (2.818 lb), while males averaged 990.8 g (2.184 lb) in weight. The lightest were from the breeding population in forest openings of Puerto Rico, where the females and males weighed an average of 1,023 g (2.255 lb) and 795 g (1.753 lb), respectively, also the highest size sexual dimorphism in the species.

Size variation in body mass reveals that the red-tailed hawks typically vary only a modest amount; racial variation in average weights of great horned owls show that mean body mass is nearly twice (the heaviest race is about 36% heavier than the lightest known race on average) as variable as that of the hawk (where the heaviest race is only just over 18% heavier on average than the lightest). Males can reportedly measure 45 to 60 cm (18 to 24 in) in total length, females measuring 48 to 65 cm (19 to 26 in) long. The wingspan can range from 105 to 141 cm (41 to 56 in) and, in the standard scientific method of measuring wing size, the wing chord is 325.1–444.5 mm (12.80–17.50 in) long. The tail measures 188 to 258.7 mm (7.40 to 10.19 in) in length. The middle toe (excluding talon) can range from 38.3 to 53.8 mm (1.51 to 2.12 in), with the hallux-claw (the talon of the rear toe, which has evolved to be the largest in accipitrids) measuring from 24.1 to 33.6 mm (0.95 to 1.32 in) in length.

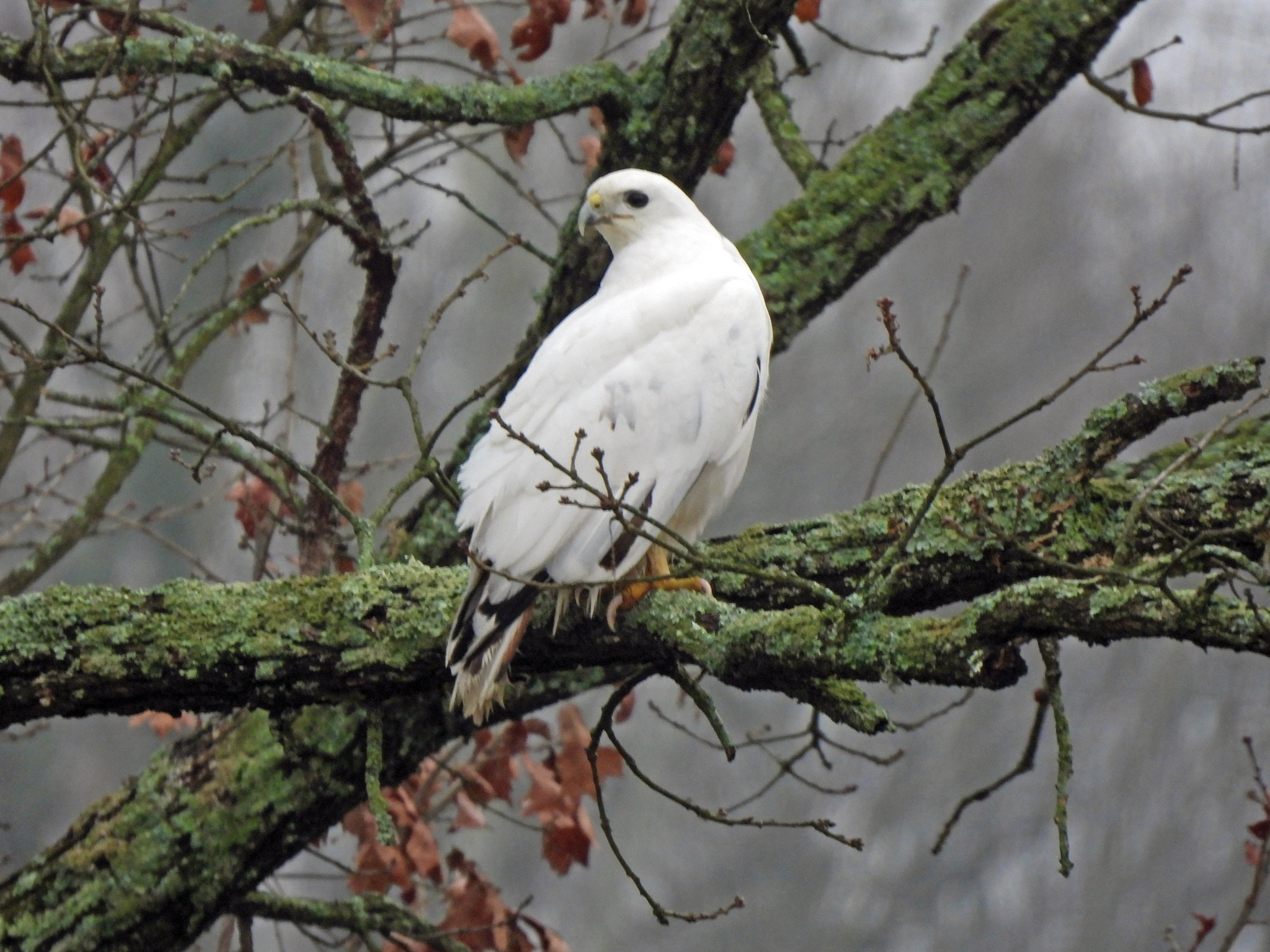
Leucistic individual, in Kentucky

Red-tailed hawk plumage can be variable, depending on the subspecies and the region. These color variations are morphs, so are not related to molting. The western North American population, B. j. calurus, is the most variable subspecies and has three color morphs - light, dark, and intermediate or rufus. The dark and intermediate morphs constitute 10–20% of the population.

Though the markings and hue vary across the subspecies, the basic appearance of the red-tailed hawk is consistent. Overall, this species is blocky and broad in shape and often heavier than other Buteo species of similar length. A whitish underbelly with a dark brown band across the belly, formed by horizontal streaks in feather patterning, is present in most color variations. Especially in younger birds, the underside may be otherwise covered with dark brown spotting. The red tail, which gives this species its name, is uniformly brick-red above and light buff-orange below. The bill is short and dark, in the hooked shape characteristic of raptors, and the head can sometimes appear small in size against the thick body frame. They have relatively short, broad tails and thick, chunky wings. The cere, legs, and feet of the red-tailed hawk are all yellow.

Adults are usually easy to identify by their red tails that end in a single black band. Immature birds are more difficult to identify, and their tails are patterned with about six darker bars. Their flight silhouette gives important clues for identification, and at close range, their yellowish irises are characteristic. As the bird attains full maturity over the course of 3–4 years, the iris slowly darkens into a reddish-brown hue.

== Distribution and ecology ==
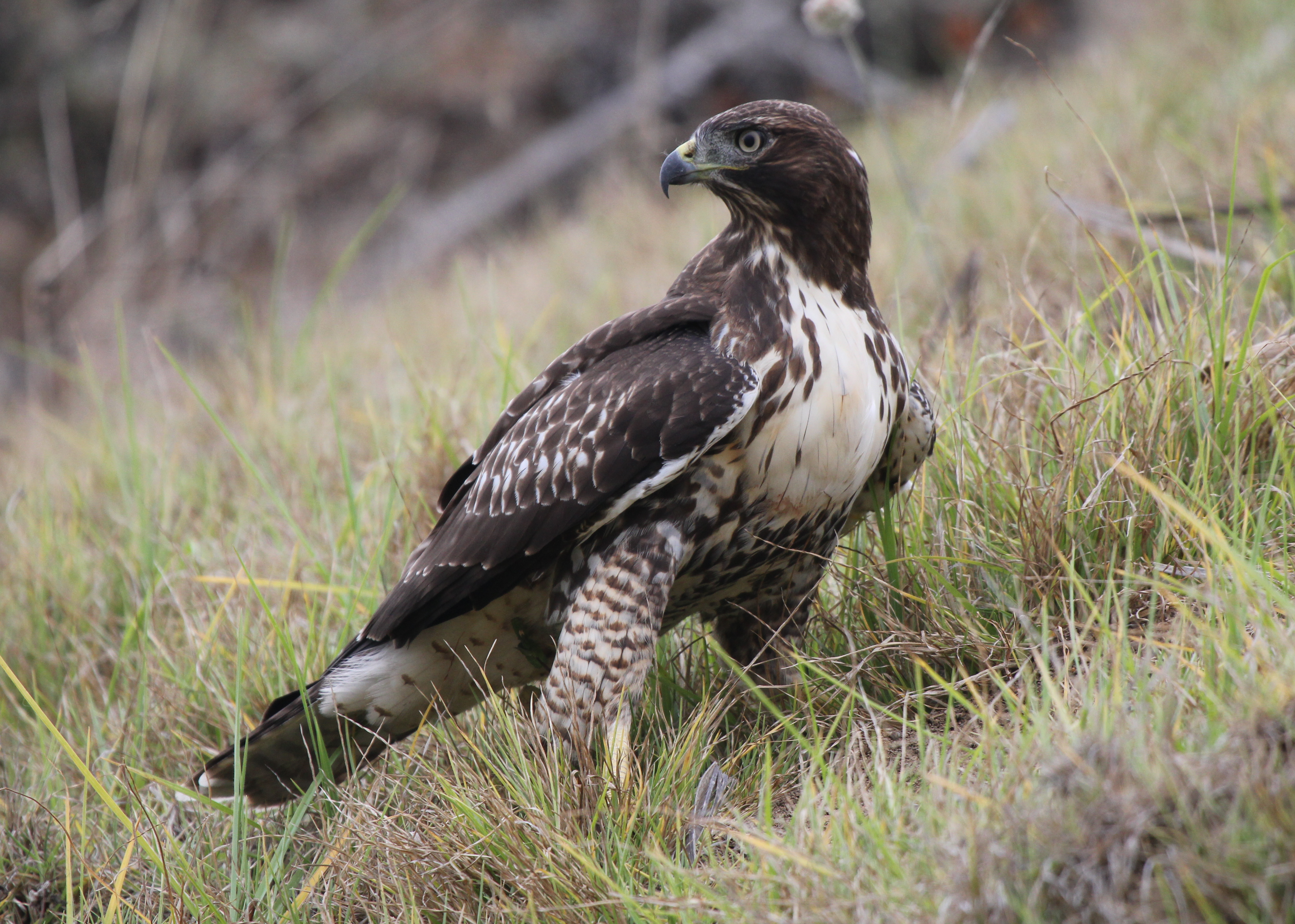
Immature in California

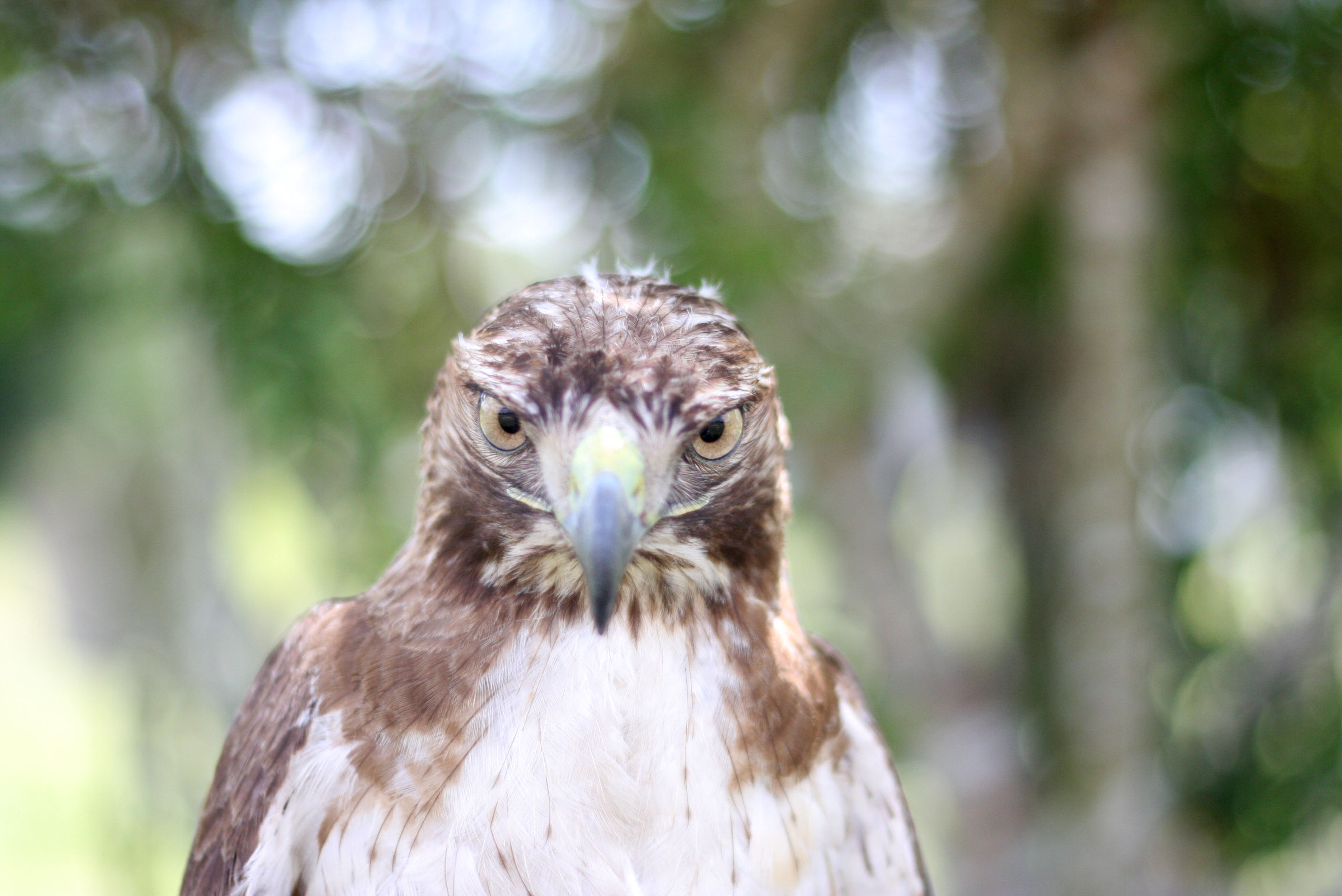
A juvenile red-tailed hawk

The red-tailed hawk is one of the most common and most widely distributed hawks in the Americas. It breeds from central Alaska, the Yukon, and the Northwest Territories east to southern Quebec and the Maritime Provinces of Canada, and south to Florida, the West Indies, and Central America. The winter range stretches from southern Canada south throughout the remainder of the breeding range.

Its preferred habitat is mixed forest and field, with high bluffs or trees that may be used as perch sites. It occupies a wide range of habitats and altitudes, including deserts, grasslands, coastal regions, mountains, foothills, coniferous and deciduous woodlands, tropical rainforests, agricultural fields, and urban areas. It is second only to the peregrine falcon in the use of diverse habitats in North America. It lives throughout the North American continent, except in areas of unbroken forest or the high Arctic.

Adult hawks have few natural predators, although their eggs and chicks are preyed on by a variety of organisms. The red-tailed hawk is widespread in North America, partially due to historic settlement patterns, which have benefited it. The clearing of forests in the Northeast created hunting areas, while the preservation of woodlots left the species with viable nest sites. The increase in trees throughout the Great Plains during the past century due to fire suppression and tree planting facilitated the western range expansion of the red-tailed hawk as well as range expansions of many other species of birds. The construction of highways with utility poles alongside treeless medians provided perfect habitat for perch-hunting. Unlike some other raptors, the red-tailed hawk is seemingly unfazed by considerable human activity and can nest and live in close proximity to large numbers of humans. Thus, the species can also be found in cities, where common prey such as rock pigeons and brown rats may support their populations. One famous urban red-tailed hawk, known as "Pale Male", became the subject of a nonfiction book, Red-Tails in Love: A Wildlife Drama in Central Park, and is the first known red-tail in decades to successfully nest and raise young in the crowded New York City borough of Manhattan.

Since red-tailed hawks are relatively specialized feeders, they harbor fewer helminth parasitic worms than species like the broad-winged hawk, which have a wider diet. Hawks in urban areas are threatened by the use of rat traps and poisoned bait to kill rodents. This generally consists of warfarin cookies, which induce internal bleeding in rats and mice, and a hawk that ingests rodents that have consumed rat poison can itself be affected.

== Behavior ==
=== Flight ===
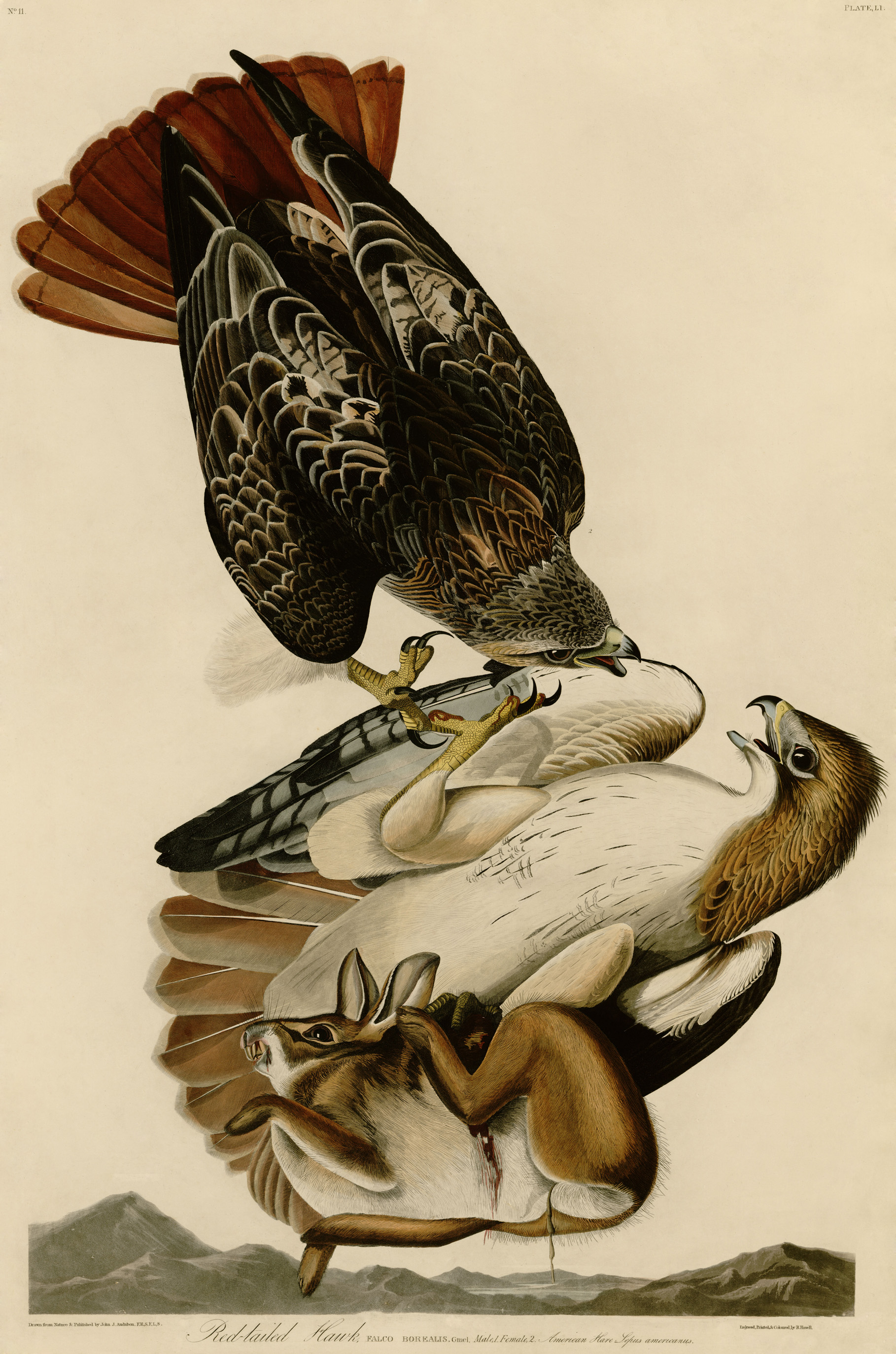
Red-tailed hawks engaging in an inflight battle over prey. Painted by John James Audubon.

In flight, this hawk soars with wings often in a slight dihedral, flapping as little as possible to conserve energy. Active flight is slow and deliberate, with deep wing beats. In wind, it occasionally hovers on beating wings and remains stationary above the ground. When soaring or flapping its wings, it typically travels from 32 to 64 km/h (40 mph), but when diving, may exceed 190 km/h (120 mph).

=== Vocalization ===
The cry of the red-tailed hawk is a two- to three-second, hoarse, rasping scream, described as kree-eee-ar, that begins at a high pitch and slurs downward. This cry is often described as sounding similar to a steam whistle. The red-tailed hawk frequently vocalizes while hunting or soaring, but vocalizes loudest in annoyance or anger, in response to a predator or a rival hawk's intrusion into its territory. At close range, it makes a croaking guh-runk. Young hawks may utter a wailing klee-uk food cry when parents leave the nest. The fierce, screaming cry of the red-tailed hawk is frequently used as a generic raptor sound effect in television shows and other media, even if the bird featured is not a red-tailed hawk.

=== Diet ===
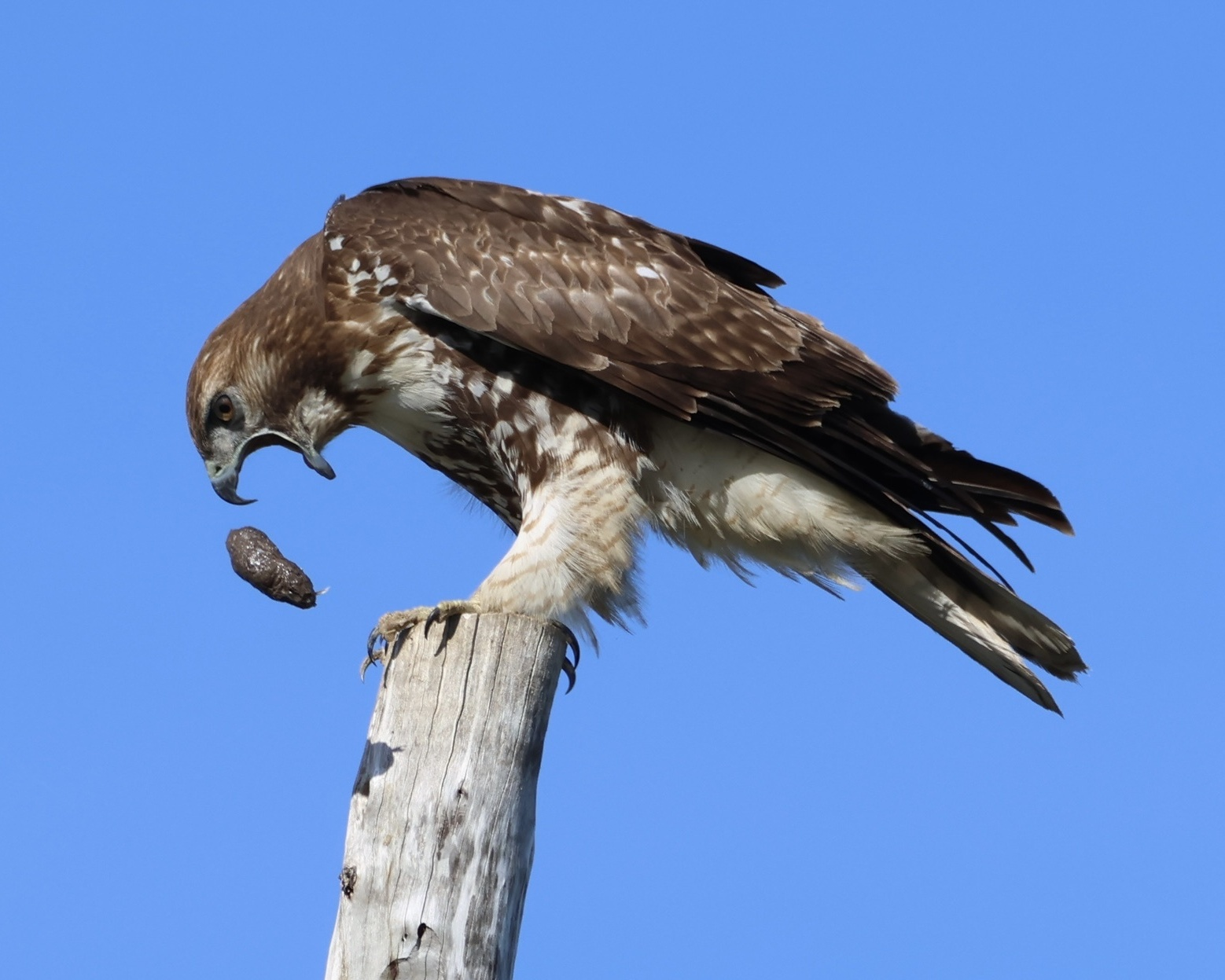
Regurgitating a pellet

The red-tailed hawk preys on small mammals such as rodents and lagomorphs, but also opportunistically consumes birds, fish, reptiles, and amphibians. Prey varies with regional and seasonal availability, but usually centers on rodents, comprising up to 85% of a hawk's diet. Most commonly reported prey types include mice, including both native Peromyscus species and house mice; gophers, voles, chipmunks, ground squirrels, and tree squirrels. Additional prey (listed in descending likelihood of predation) include lagomorphs, shrews, bats, pigeons, quail, corvids, waterfowl, other raptors, reptiles, fish, crustaceans, insects and earthworms. In exceptional case, red-tailed hawks in Caribbean islands prey mostly on reptiles such as snakes and lizards, since these are perhaps the most predominant native land animals of that region.

As opportunistic predator, they can also prey on animals as large as adult black-tailed jackrabbits, striped skunks, and western diamondback rattlesnake which easily surpass the weight of most red-tails. Hawks will eat carrion if need be, although it is not a preferred food source. During winter in captivity, an average red-tail eats about 135 g (4.8 oz) daily.

The red-tailed hawk commonly employs one of two hunting techniques. Often, they scan for prey activity from an elevated perch site, swooping down from the perch to seize the prey. They also watch for prey while flying, either capturing a bird in flight or pursuing prey on the ground until they can pin them down in their talons. Red-tailed hawks, like some other raptors, have been observed to hunt in pairs. This may consist of stalking opposites sides of a tree, to surround a tree squirrel and almost inevitably drive the rodent to be captured by one after being flushed by the other hawk. They are opportunistically attracted to conspicuous meals, such as displaying male red-winged blackbirds.

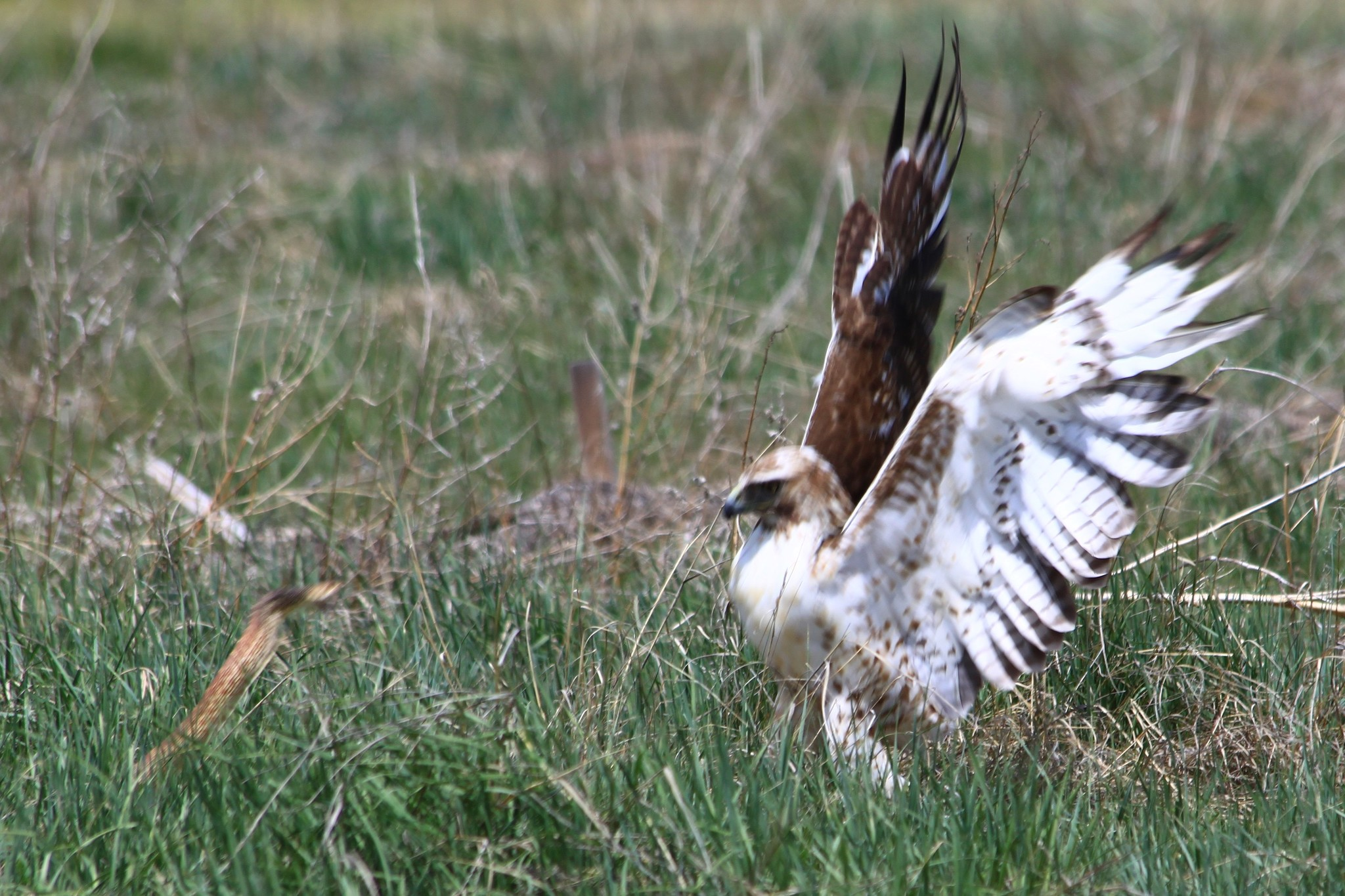
Hunting a bullsnake

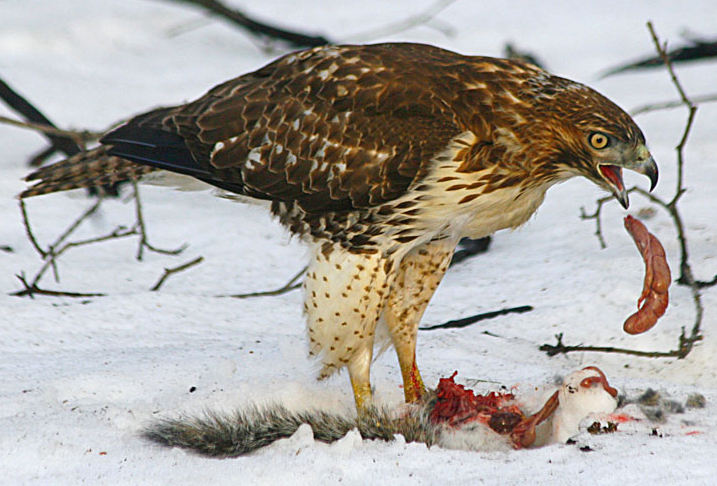
Juvenile eating a squirrel

Red-tailed hawk eating a rodent

The great horned owl occupies a similar ecological niche nocturnally to the red-tail, taking similar prey. Competition may occur between the hawk and owl species during twilight, although the differing nesting season and activity times usually results in a lack of direct competition. Although the red-tail's prey is on average larger (due in part to the scarcity of diurnal squirrels in the owl's diet), the owl is an occasional predator of red-tailed hawks themselves, of any age, while the hawks are not known to prey on adult great horned owls.

Other competitors include other large Buteo species such as Swainson's hawks and rough-legged hawks, as well as the northern goshawk, since prey and foraging methods of these species occasionally overlap. Hawks have been observed following American badgers to capture prey they flush, and the two are considered potential competitors. Competition over carcasses may occur with American crows, and several crows working together can displace a hawk. Larger raptors, such as eagles and ferruginous hawks, may steal hawk kills.

=== Reproduction ===
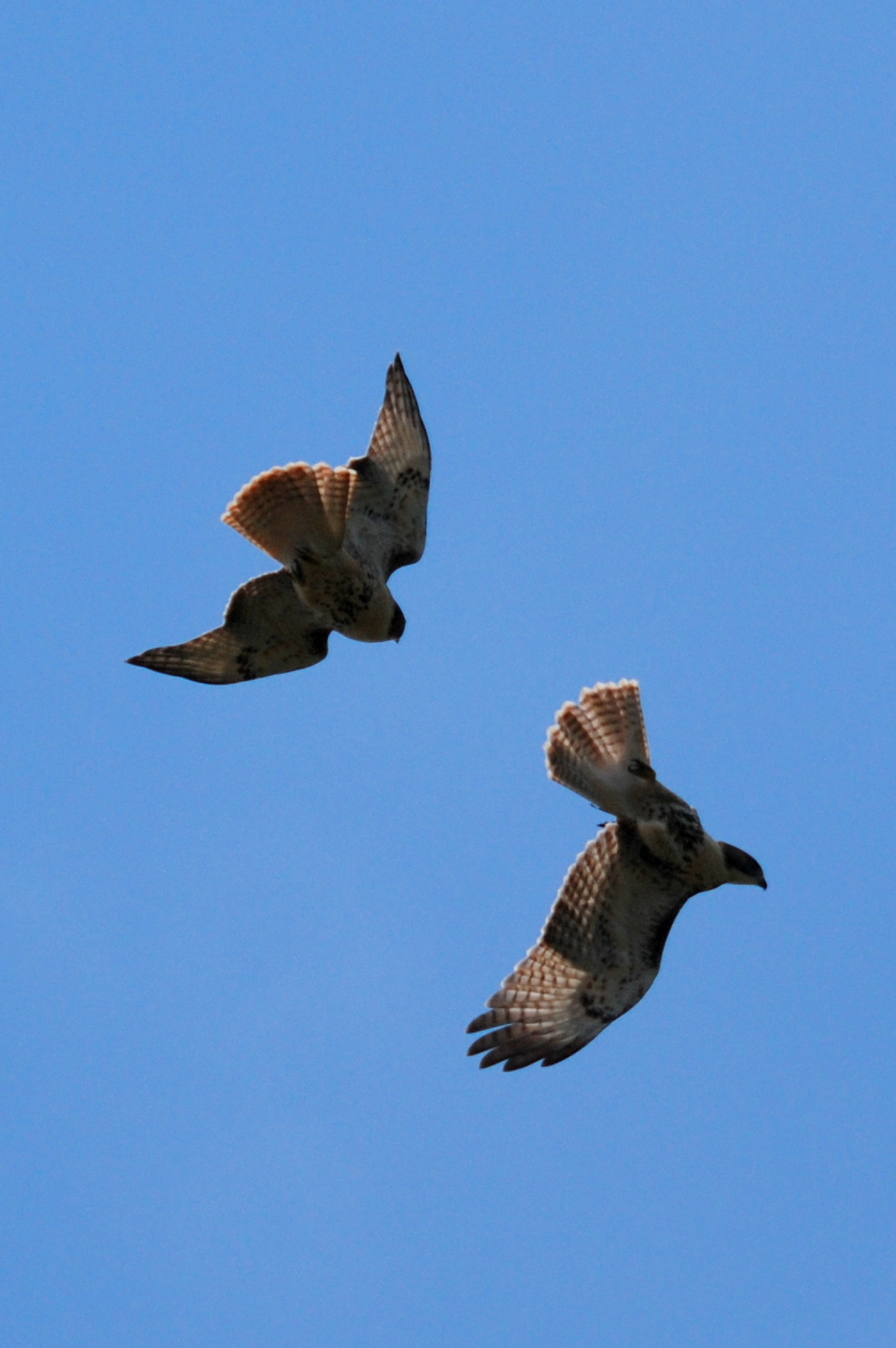
Territorial adult chasing away an immature red-tailed hawk

The red-tailed hawk reaches sexual maturity at two years of age. It is monogamous, mating with the same individual for many years. In general, the red-tailed hawk only takes a new mate when its original mate dies. The same nesting territory may be defended by the pair for years. During courtship, the male and female fly in wide circles while uttering shrill cries. The male performs aerial displays, diving steeply, and then climbing again. After repeating this display several times, he sometimes grasps her talons briefly with his own. Courtship flights can last 10 minutes or more. Copulation often follows courtship flight sequences, although copulation also frequently occurs in the absence of courtship flights.

In copulation, the female, when perched, tilts forward, allowing the male to land with his feet lodged on her horizontal back. The female twists and moves her tail feathers to one side, while the mounted male twists his cloacal opening around the female's cloaca. Copulation lasts 5 to 10 seconds, and during prenesting courtship in late winter or early spring, can occur numerous times each day.

In the same period, the pair constructs a stick nest in a large tree 4 to 21 m (13 to 69 ft) off the ground or on a cliff ledge 35 m (115 ft) or higher above the ground, or may nest on man-made structures. The nest is generally 71 to 97 cm (28 to 38 in) in diameter and can be up to 90 cm (3.0 ft) tall. The nest is constructed of twigs lined with bark, pine needles, corn cobs, husks, stalks, aspen catkins, or other plant lining matter.

Great horned owls compete with the red-tailed hawk for nest sites. Each species has been known to kill the young and destroy the eggs of the other, but in general, both species nest in adjacent or confluent territories without conflict. Great horned owls are incapable of constructing nests and typically expropriate existing red-tail nests. Great horned owls begin nesting behaviors much earlier than red-tails, often as early as December. Red-tails are therefore adapted to constructing new nests when a previous year's nest has been overtaken by owls or otherwise lost. New nests are typically within a kilometer or less of the previous nest. Often, a new nest is only a few hundred meters or less from a previous one. Being a large predator, most predation of these hawks occurs with eggs and nestlings, which are taken by owls, corvids and raccoons.

Parent in nest with chicks

A clutch of one to five eggs is laid in spring, with an egg roughly every second day. They are incubated by both parents. The altricial nestlings emerge from the eggs over 2 to 4 days. The female broods them while the male provides most of the food to the female. The female feeds the young, tearing it into manageable pieces for them. After 42 to 46 days, the young start to leave the nest. Fledging, including learning to fly and hunt, takes some 10 weeks. About 6 to 7 weeks after fledging, the young begin to capture their own prey.

=== Migration ===
The species is a partial migrant, as in most of their range in Canada and Alaska, they almost entirely vacate their breeding grounds. In coastal areas of the north, however, such as in the Pacific Northwest to southern Alaska and in Nova Scotia on the Atlantic, they do not usually migrate. The birds tend to be territorial during winter, but may shift ranges whenever food requirements demand it. Autumn hawk watches in Ontario, Quebec, and the northern United States have recorded 4,500–8,900 red-tailed hawks migrating through, with records of up to 15,000 in a season at Hawk Ridge in Duluth, Minnesota.

Unlike some other Buteo species, such as Swainson's hawks and broad-winged hawks, red-tailed hawks do not usually migrate in groups, instead passing by one-by-one, and only migrate on days when winds are favorable. Most migrants do not move past southern Mexico in late autumn. Spring northward movements may commence as early as late February, with peak numbers usually occurring in late March and early April. Seasonal counts may include up to 19,000 red-tails in spring at Derby Hill hawk watch, in Oswego, New York; sometimes, more than 5,000 have been recorded in a day there.

== Relationship with humans ==
=== Use in falconry ===
The red-tailed hawk is a popular bird in falconry, particularly in the United States, where the sport of falconry is tightly regulated and where red-tailed hawks are both widely available and allowed to novice falconers. Red-tailed hawks are highly tameable and trainable, with a more social disposition than all other falcons or hawks other than Harris's hawk. They are also long-lived and highly disease-resistant, allowing a falconer to maintain a red-tailed hawk as a hunting companion for many years. Fewer than 5,000 falconers are in the United States, so despite their popularity, any effect on the red-tailed hawk population, estimated to be about one million in the United States, is negligible.

Not being as swift as falcons or accipiters, red-tailed hawks are not the most effective of bird hawks and are usually used against ground game such as rabbits and squirrels. Some individuals, though, may learn to ambush birds on the ground with a swift surprise approach and capture them before they can accelerate to full speed and escape. Some have even learned to use a falcon-like diving stoop to capture challenging game such as pheasants. In the course of a typical hunt, a falconer using a red-tailed hawk most commonly releases the hawk and allows it to perch in a tree or other high vantage point. The falconer, who may be aided by a dog, then attempts to flush prey by stirring up ground cover. A well-trained red-tailed hawk will follow the falconer and dog, realizing that their activities produce opportunities to catch game. Once a raptor catches game, it does not bring it back to the falconer. Instead, the falconer must locate the bird and its captured prey, "make in" (carefully approach), and trade the bird its kill in exchange for a piece of offered meat.

=== Feathers and Native American use ===
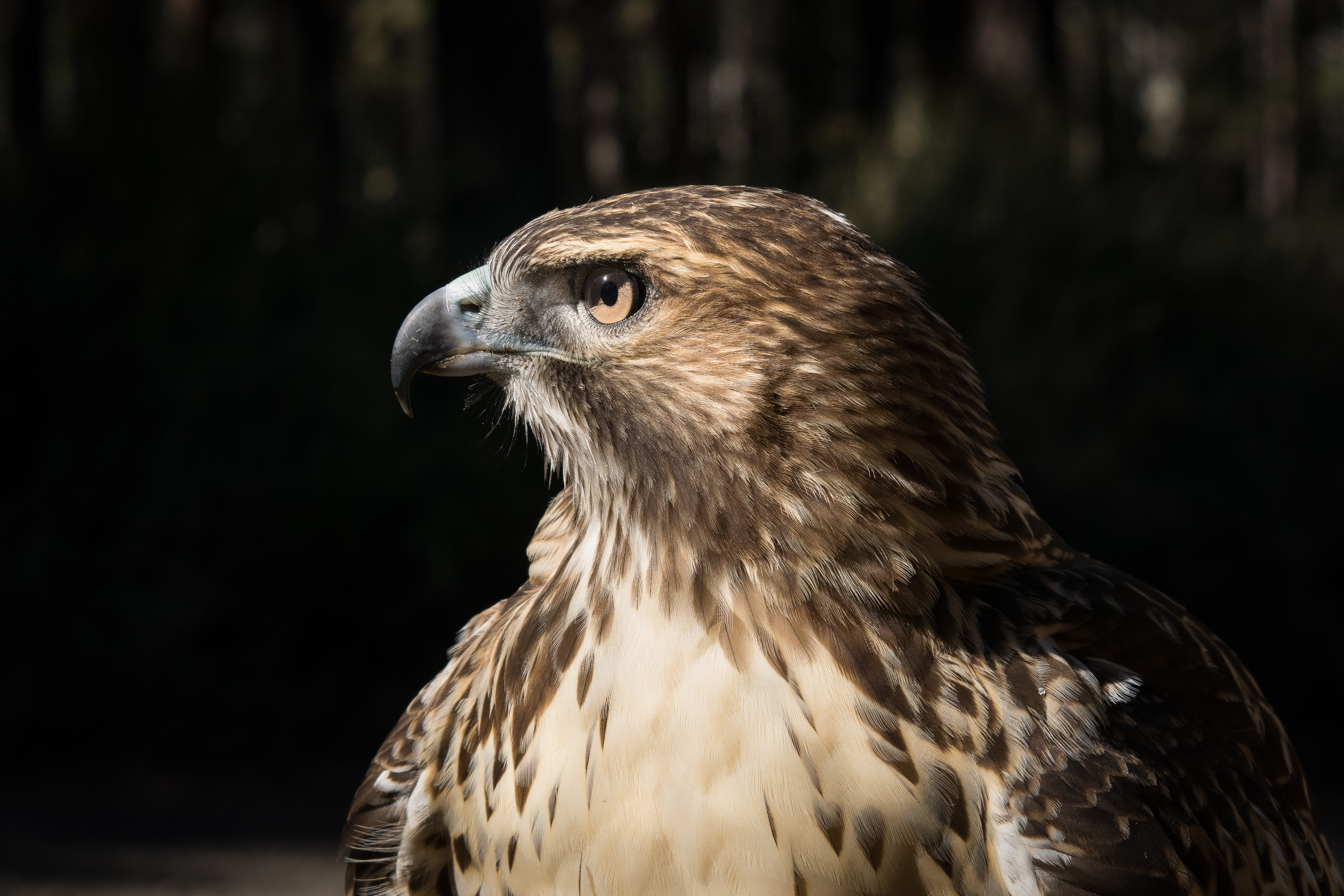
Red-tailed hawk in Oregon

The feathers and other parts of the red-tailed hawk are considered sacred to many American indigenous people, and like the feathers of the bald eagle and golden eagle, are sometimes used in religious ceremonies and found adorning the regalia of many Native Americans in the United States; these parts, most especially their distinctive tail feathers, are a popular item in the Native American community.

As with the other two species, the feathers and parts of the red-tailed hawk are regulated by the eagle feather law, which governs the possession of feathers and parts of migratory birds.
