= Chickenhawk (bird) =

Common US name for several raptors

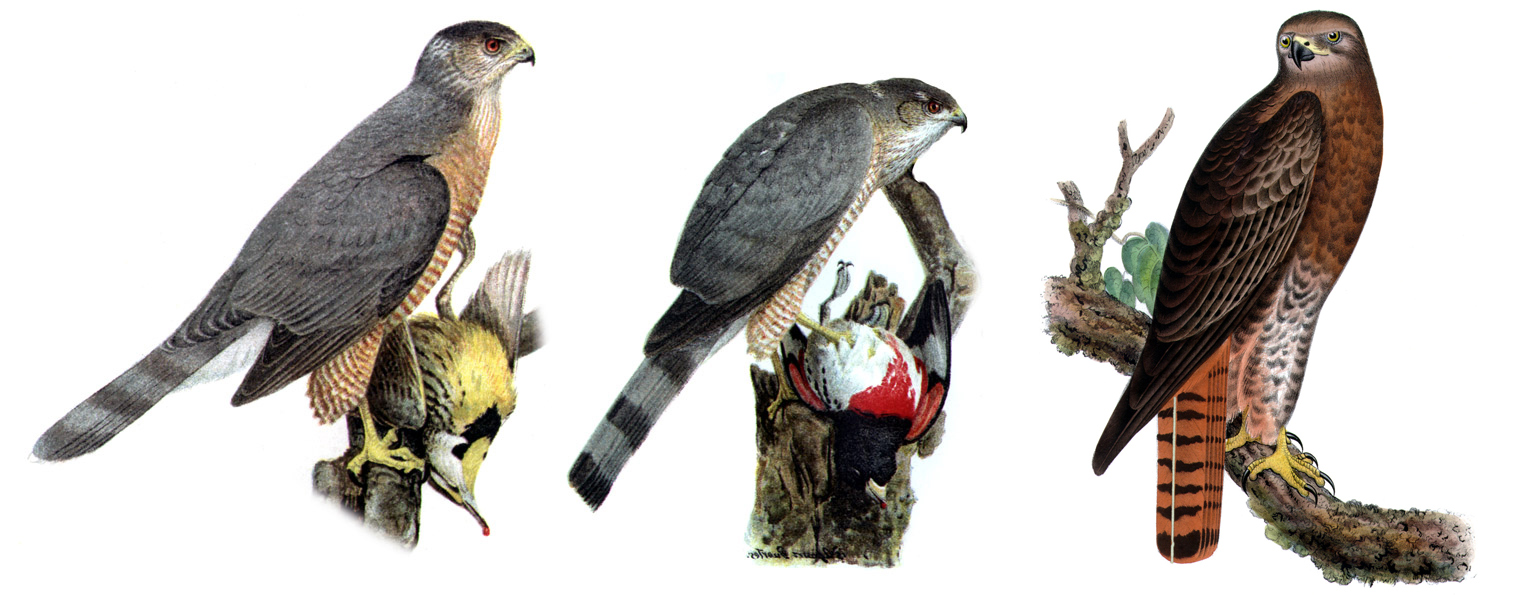
Left to right: Cooper's hawk, sharp-shinned hawk, and the red-tailed hawk (not to scale).

In the United States, chickenhawk or chicken hawk is an unofficial designation for three species of North American hawks in the family Accipitridae: Cooper's hawk (also called a quail hawk), the sharp-shinned hawk, and the Buteo species red-tailed hawk. The term "chicken hawk", however, is inaccurate. Although Cooper's and sharp-shinned hawks do primarily hunt other birds, chickens do not make up a significant part of their diets; red-tailed hawks may opportunistically hunt free-range poultry, but are chiefly predators of mammals such as rodents and rabbits.

Historically, misinterpretation of the name "chicken hawk" has labelled these birds as pests, hence justifying their slaughter. Officially, per the American Ornithologists' Union's list of bird names, the term has become obsolete as applied to birds, but still enjoys widespread colloquial use in rural areas where any of the three species has been seen as a threat to small outdoor animals kept as pets or livestock, especially chickens.

While the term is still widely used by those who keep such animals, it is too ambiguous to be of any scholarly usefulness, especially since the meaning of hawk differs between America and Europe; thus, the term's propriety (or lack thereof) depends entirely upon context.

The unofficial names of other raptors that are derived from their supposed prey include: duck hawk (peregrine falcon), sparrowhawk (American kestrel), goshawk (northern goshawk), pigeon hawk (merlin), fish hawk (osprey), cuckoo-hawk, and quail hawk (Cooper's hawk).

== In popular culture ==
- Henery Hawk is a cartoon character created by Chuck Jones and Robert McKimson in the Looney Tunes series. The premise of this character was that he was too young to know what a chicken was; hence, although having a great deal of energy, he was easily tricked into thinking that other animals (usually the Barnyard Dawg or Sylvester) were chickens. The character Foghorn Leghorn was introduced to complement the Henery Hawk character, but quickly eclipsed him in popularity. He, along with the rest of the Looney Tunes cast, returned in the latest Looney Tunes installment, a sitcom called The Looney Tunes Show. In addition to the aforementioned Henery Hawk, Looney Tunes features chicken hawks Elvis and Pappy.
- Jim Henson's Animal Show featured Armstrong the Chickenhawk (performed by Bill Barretta), who is the show's expert on birds.
- An episode of The Waltons, "The Hawk", had a secondary plot dealing with a chicken hawk.
