= You Were Never Duckier =

- Original title card
- Directed by: Charles M. Jones
- Story by: Tedd Pierce
- Starring: Mel Blanc
- Music by: Carl Stalling
- Animation by: Ben Washam; Lloyd Vaughan; Ken Harris; Phil Monroe
- Layouts by: Robert Gribbroek
- Backgrounds by: Peter Alvarado
- Color process: Technicolor
- Production company: Warner Bros. Cartoons
- Distributed by: Warner Bros. Pictures; The Vitaphone Corporation
- Release date: August 7, 1948
- Running time: 7:57
- Country: United States
- Language: English

You Were Never Duckier is a 1948 Warner Bros. Merrie Melodies cartoon directed by Chuck Jones. The cartoon was released on August 7, 1948, and stars Daffy Duck and Henery Hawk.

== Plot ==
Daffy Duck, outraged by the low prize for ducks at the National Poultry Show, disguises himself as a rooster to win the $5,000 prize. However, his plan goes awry when he is mistaken for a chicken and taken home by Henery Hawk. Trapped in a chicken-hawk's house, Daffy's attempts to prove he is a duck only lead to chaos. Eventually escaping, he rushes back to the contest but loses both the rooster and duck prizes to Henery's father and Henery himself.

== Voice cast ==
- Mel Blanc as Daffy Duck / Henery Hawk / George K. Hawk / Rooster

== Production notes ==
You Were Never Duckier marked the start of a direction change for Daffy, from a screwball, to a greedy, self-centered one (though, according to commentary by Eric Goldberg on the Looney Tunes Golden Collection: Volume 5 DVD and the Looney Tunes Collector's Vault: Volume 2 Blu-ray, this cartoon showed Daffy as being both a greedy, self-centered character and a screwball one). This cartoon was also the penultimate Henery Hawk cartoon to not be directed by Robert McKimson, and one of only three to be directed by creator Chuck Jones (after The Squawkin' Hawk and followed by The Scarlet Pumpernickel).

The title is a play on the 1942 musical film You Were Never Lovelier.

== Home media ==
- VHS 1988 - Daffy Duck's Madcap Mania (Blue Ribbon) - Warner Home Video
- VHS 2001 - Looney Tunes: The Collector's Edition: Vol. 12 - Porky and Daffy (Blue Ribbon) - Warner Home Video/Columbia House
- DVD 2007 - Looney Tunes Golden Collection: Volume 5 (restored with original titles) - Warner Home Video
- DVD 2007 - Looney Tunes Spotlight Collection: Volume 5 (restored with original titles) - Warner Home Video
- Blu-ray 2026 - Looney Tunes Collector's Vault: Volume 2 (restored with original titles) - Warner Archive Collection

== See also ==
- Looney Tunes and Merrie Melodies filmography (1940–1949)
- Daffy Duck filmography

Preceded by The Up-Standing Sitter	Daffy Duck cartoons 1948	Succeeded by Daffy Dilly
