= Virgin Islands Department of Education =

Education agency

Department overview
- Jurisdiction: United States Virgin Islands
- Headquarters: 8262 Crown Bay, Building B, Unit 4-11, St. Thomas, VI 00802
- Department executives: Dionne Wells-Hedrington; Victor Somme
- Website: https://www.vide.vi/

The Virgin Islands Department of Education is the education agency of the United States Virgin Islands. The agency has its headquarters in St. Thomas.

== Education Board members ==
Current members of the Virgin Islands Board of Education are listed below. Elections are formally nonpartisan, with the party affiliations below reflecting known political history, candidate self-declaration, or state party support.

District	Name	Party	Start	Next Election
At large Saint John (Note: One member is elected by USVI voters at large, but must be a resident of Saint John.)	Abigail Hendricks Cagan	Independent	January 6, 2025	2028
Saint Croix	Winona Hendricks	Democratic	January 5, 2009	2026
Saint Croix	Terrence Joseph	Democratic	January 7, 2013	2026
Saint Croix	Mary Moorhead	Independent	January 6, 2025	2028
Saint Croix	Emmanuella Perez-Cassius, Vice Chair	Democratic	January 4, 2021	2028
Saint Thomas	Kyza Callwood, Chair	Democratic	January 2, 2017	2028
Saint Thomas	Judy Gomez	Democratic	January 3, 2005	2026
Saint Thomas	Arah Lockhart, Secretary	Democratic	January 2, 2023	2026
Saint Thomas	Nandi Sekou	Democratic	January 4, 2021	2028

== Divisions ==
School districts in the USVI: The agency puts its K-12 schools into two school districts:

- St. Thomas-St. John School District
- St. Croix School District
