= The Up-Standing Sitter =

- Title card
- Directed by: Robert McKimson
- Story by: Warren Foster
- Starring: Mel Blanc
- Music by: Carl Stalling
- Animation by: Phil De Lara; Manny Gould; John Carey; Charles McKimson
- Layouts by: Cornett Wood
- Backgrounds by: Richard H. Thomas
- Color process: Cinecolor
- Production company: Warner Bros. Cartoons
- Distributed by: Warner Bros. Pictures
- Release date: July 3, 1948 (USA)
- Running time: 6:49
- Language: English

The Up-Standing Sitter is a 1948 Warner Bros. Looney Tunes cartoon, directed by Robert McKimson. The cartoon was released on July 3, 1948, and stars Daffy Duck. All voices are by Mel Blanc.

== Plot ==
Daffy Duck, employed by a baby-sitting agency, is tasked with watching over a hen's egg on a farm. When the egg hatches into a mischievous chick resembling Henery Hawk, chaos ensues as the chick relentlessly torments Daffy with pranks and gags. Daffy's various attempts to control the chick backfire, leading to mishaps, including encounters with a bulldog. Eventually, Daffy concedes defeat and humorously informs his agency that his next job will have to be done "standing up."

== Production notes ==
The title is a play on the expression "up-standing citizen" and on standing being opposite of sitting (a fact which figures into the film's closing gag). The cartoon was made in Cinecolor when a 1948 strike briefly halted production at Technicolor.

== Home media ==
- VHS 1988 - Cartoon Moviestars: Daffy! - MGM/UA Home Video
- Laserdisc 1988 - Cartoon Moveistars: Daffy! & Porky! - MGM/UA Home Video
- Laserdisc 1992 - The Golden Age of Looney Tunes: Volume 3 - MGM/UA Home Video
- DVD 2007: Looney Tunes Golden Collection: Volume 5 (restored) - Warner Home Video
- DVD 2007 - Looney Tunes Spotlight Collection: Volume 5 (restored) - Warner Home Video

== See also ==
- Looney Tunes and Merrie Melodies filmography (1940–1949)
- Daffy Duck filmography

Preceded by Daffy Duck Slept Here	Daffy Duck Cartoons; 1948	Succeeded by You Were Never Duckier
