= St. Croix School District =

School district in the United States Virgin Islands

Coordinates: 17.7445°N 64.6997°W

- Region served: Saint Croix, U.S. Virgin Islands
- Insular Superintendent: Dr. Carla A. Bastian-Knight
- Deputy Superintendent: Jessica John Baptiste
- Deputy Superintendent: Andrea Shillingford
- Affiliations: Public School System

St. Croix School District is a school district in the United States Virgin Islands. It is a division of the Virgin Islands Department of Education.

The district serves students on island of St. Croix.

== Schools ==
=== High Schools ===
- St. Croix Central High School
- St. Croix Educational Complex

=== Junior High Schools ===
- Elena Christian Junior High School (now defunct)
- Arthur A. Richards Junior High School (now defunct)
- John H. Woodson Junior High School

=== Elementary Schools ===
- Alfredo Andrews Elementary School
- Claude O. Markoe Elementary School
- Eulalie Rivera K-8 School
- Juanita Gardine K-8 School
- Lew Muckle Elementary School (PreK-6)
- Pearl B. Larsen PreK-8 School
- Ricardo Richards Elementary School

=== Other ===
- St. Croix Career and Technical Education Center (attached to St. Croix Educational Complex)
