= Diane T. Capehart =

American Virgin Islander politician

Member of the Virgin Islands Legislature from the St. Croix District
- In office January 9, 2023 – January 13, 2025
- In office January 14, 2013 – January 12, 2015

Personal details
- Political party: Democratic

Diane T. Capehart is an American Virgin Islander politician. She served as a Democratic member for the St. Croix district of the Virgin Islands Legislature.
