= List of the largest school districts in the United States by enrollment =

This is a list of school districts in the United States ranked by 2021 enrollment.

2021	2014 vs 2016	2016 vs 2018	2018 vs 2019	2019 vs 2021	School district	State/Territory	Students (autumn 2014)	Students (autumn 2016)	Students (autumn 2018)	Students (autumn 2019)	Students (autumn 2021)
1	Steady	Steady	Steady	Steady	New York City	New York	995,192	984,462	960,484	956,634	859,514
2	Steady	Steady	Steady	Steady	Los Angeles Unified	California	646,683	633,621	495,255	483,234	435,958
3	Steady	Steady	Steady	Steady	City of Chicago (SD 299)	Illinois	392,558	378,199	359,476	347,484	329,836
4	Steady	Steady	Steady	Steady	Miami-Dade County	Florida	356,964	357,249	350,434	347,307	328,589
5	Steady	Steady	Steady	Steady	Clark County	Nevada	324,093	326,953	330,225	328,991	315,787
6	Steady	Steady	Steady	Steady	Broward County	Florida	266,265	271,852	270,978	269,172	256,037
7	Steady	▲1	Steady	Steady	Hillsborough County	Florida	207,469	214,386	220,252	223,305	224,149
8	Steady	Steady	Steady	▲1	Orange County	Florida	191,648	200,674	208,203	208,875	203,224
9	Steady	▼1	Steady	▼1	Houston ISD	Texas	215,225	216,106	209,772	210,061	194,607
10	Steady	Steady	Steady	Steady	Palm Beach	Florida	186,605	192,721	192,533	194,675	187,943
11	Steady	Steady	Steady	▲2	Gwinnett County	Georgia	173,246	178,214	179,758	180,589	179,581
12	Steady	Steady	Steady	▼1	Fairfax County	Virginia	185,541	187,467	187,797	188,887	178,479
13	Steady	Steady	Steady	▼1	Hawaii Department of Education	Hawaii	182,384	181,550	181,278	181,088	173,178
14	▲1	▼1	Steady	▲1	Wake County	North Carolina	155,820	160,467	161,784	163,404	160,099
15	▲1	▲1	Steady	▼1	Montgomery County	Maryland	154,434	159,010	162,680	165,267	158,231
16	▼2	Steady	Steady		Dallas ISD	Texas	160,253	157,886	155,119	153,861	143,558
17	Steady	Steady	Steady	Steady	Charlotte-Mecklenburg	North Carolina	145,636	147,428	147,638	149,845	143,244
18	Steady	Steady	Steady	▲2	Duval County	Florida	128,685	129,479	130,229	130,279	128,948
19	▲2	▲1	Steady	▼1	Prince George's County	Maryland	127,576	130,814	132,657	135,952	128,770
20	Steady	▼1	Steady	▼1	Philadelphia City	Pennsylvania	134,241	133,929	132,520	130,617	118,053
21	▲1	▲1	Steady	Steady	Cypress-Fairbanks ISD	Texas	113,023	114,868	116,512	117,446	117,217
22	▲1	▲2	Steady	Steady	Baltimore County	Maryland	109,830	112,139	113,814	115,038	111,136
23	▲1	▼1	Steady	▲1	Cobb County	Georgia	111,751	113,151	111,854	112,097	106,970
24	▼3	▲2	Steady	▼1	Shelby County	Tennessee	115,810	111,403	112,125	113,198	105,596
25	▲2	▲1	▲1	▲1	Polk County	Florida	99,723	102,295	101,408	102,952	105,422
26	▲1	▲1	Steady	▼1	Northside ISD	Texas	103,606	106,145	106,501	107,817	102,377
27	Steady	Steady	▲1	▲4	Lee County	Florida	89,364	92,686	94,410	95,613	97,264
28	▲1	▼1	▼1	▲1	Pinellas County	Florida	103,774	102,905	100,948	99,772	95,446
29	▼2	▼5	▼1	▼2	San Diego Unified	California	129,779	128,040	103,194	102,270	95,233
30	▼1	Steady	▲2	▼2	Jefferson County	Kentucky	100,602	99,813	97,936	100,348	94,393
31	▼1	Steady	▼1	▼1	DeKalb County	Georgia	101,103	101,284	99,166	98,800	93,473
32	Steady	Steady	▼1	Steady	Fulton County	Georgia	95,460	96,122	94,491	93,897	90,355
33	Steady	▲1	▲1	Steady	Prince William County	Virginia	86,641	89,345	90,843	92,237	90,070
34	Steady	Steady	▼1	Steady	Denver	Colorado	88,839	91,138	92,039	92,143	88,911
35	▲5	▲4	▲2	▲6	Katy ISD	Texas	70,330	75,428	79,913	83,423	88,368
36	▲3	▲1	▲1	▲4	Alpine	Utah	75,161	78,957	81,715	83,540	86,275
37	▲1	▲2	▲2	Steady	Anne Arundel County	Maryland	79,518	81,379	83,300	84,984	83,163
38	Steady	▼1	Steady	▼3	Albuquerque	New Mexico	93,001	90,651	89,788	88,312	81,762
39	▲3	▲5	▲1	▲8	Pasco County	Florida	69,295	72,493	75,048	76,661	81,157
40	▲4	▲3	▲1	▼1	Loudoun County	Virginia	73,418	78,348	81,906	83,606	81,131
41	▲2	▲2	Steady	▼5	Davidson County	Tennessee	84,069	85,163	84,667	85,588	80,381
42	▼2	▼4	Steady	▲2	Baltimore City	Maryland	84,976	82,354	79,297	79,187	77,807
43	▲2	▲2	▲1	▲2	Fort Bend ISD	Texas	72,152	74,146	76,122	77,756	77,545
44	Steady	▼1	▼1	▲2	Greenville County, 01	South Carolina	75,508	76,918	76,158	77,302	76,939
45	Steady	Steady	▼1	▼7	Jefferson County, No R1	Colorado	86,581	86,371	84,646	84,078	76,904
46	Steady	▼2	▼4	▼4	Fort Worth ISD	Texas	85,975	87,428	84,510	82,891	74,850
47	Steady	▼3	▼1	▼4	Austin ISD	Texas	84,564	83,067	80,032	80,911	74,602
48	▼1	▲3	▲1	Steady	Davis	Utah	70,857	72,987	74,289	74,773	74,486
49	Steady	▼1	Steady	▲1	Brevard County	Florida	72,285	73,444	73,734	73,962	72,497
50	▲5	▲8	▲1	▲4	Osceola County	Florida	59,320	63,031	68,554	69,925	72,427
51	▼4	▼3	Steady	▲2	Fresno Unified	California	73,543	73,356	71,152	71,265	69,873
52	▼3	Steady	Steady	▼1	Guilford County	North Carolina	73,416	73,059	72,950	72,682	69,173
53	▼3	▼1	▼2	▼4	Milwaukee	Wisconsin	77,316	76,206	75,431	74,683	69,115
54	▲4	▲4	▲4	▲7	Conroe ISD	Texas	56,363	59,764	62,837	64,799	67,761
55	▼4	▼7	Steady	▼3	Long Beach Unified	California	79,709	76,428	72,935	71,712	67,292
56	▲2	▲1	Steady	Steady	Seminole County	Florida	66,134	67,808	68,269	68,096	66,729
57	▲20	▲6	▲3	▲8	Frisco ISD	Texas	49,644	55,923	60,182	62,705	65,825
58	Steady	▲2	Steady	Steady	Washoe County	Nevada	65,682	66,671	67,113	67,301	65,538
59	▼3	▲2	▼1	▼4	Virginia Beach City	Virginia	70,121	69,085	68,624	68,706	65,450
60	▼1	▲2	Steady	▼3	Douglas County, No RE1	Colorado	66,702	67,470	67,591	67,305	63,596
61	Steady	▲2	▼2	▲3	Volusia County	Florida	61,777	63,028	63,223	63,009	62,666
62	▼1	▼5	Steady	▼2	Granite	Utah	69,994	69,580	66,767	66,276	62,544
63	▼1	▲2	▼1	▲4	Chesterfield County	Virginia	59,725	60,060	61,552	62,614	62,445
64	▲1	▼2	▲1	▼1	Elk Grove Unified	California	62,888	63,061	63,100	63,660	62,229
65	▲1	▼5	Steady	▼6	Aldine ISD	Texas	69,716	69,768	66,854	67,259	61,633
66	Steady	▼1	▼1	▲2	Knox County	Tennessee	59,733	60,372	60,854	61,545	60,426
67	▼1	▼3	▼1	▼5	North East ISD	Texas	67,971	67,531	65,186	64,539	59,830
68	▲3	▲12	▲1	▲3	Jordan	Utah	52,274	53,416	56,176	57,771	59,363
69	▲1	▼2	▼3	▼3	Mesa Unified	Arizona	63,849	63,444	63,124	62,703	58,859
70	▲7	▲5	Steady	Steady	Howard County	Maryland	53,685	55,626	57,907	58,868	57,325
71	▼4	▼4	Steady	▼2	Arlington ISD	Texas	63,882	62,181	59,900	59,532	56,311
72	Steady	▼2	▼1	▲2	Garland ISD	Texas	57,436	57,133	55,987	55,701	53,674
73	Steady	▲3	▲2	▼1	Cherry Creek, No 5	Colorado	54,535	54,852	55,839	56,228	53,587
74	▲4	▲12	▲1	▲4	Klein ISD	Texas	49,402	51,810	53,328	54,096	53,294
75	▲8	▲16	▲2	▲17	Forsyth County	Georgia	42,435	46,238	49,346	50,544	52,757
76	▼1	▼1	▲1	Steady	Winston-Salem/Forsyth County	North Carolina	54,762	55,228	54,707	54,566	52,681
77	▼1	▼6	▼1	▲2	Mobile County	Alabama	57,910	56,628	53,967	53,941	52,614
78	▲4	▲3	▼1	▼1	Clayton County	Georgia	53,367	54,345	54,840	54,424	52,335
79	▼1	▲8	▲1	▲1	Omaha	Nebraska	51,928	52,344	53,194	53,483	51,626
80	▲6	▲5	▲2	▼7	Seattle	Washington	52,834	54,215	55,271	55,986	51,443
81	▼5	▲3	▼1	▲3	Corona-Norco Unified	California	53,739	53,157	53,002	52,557	50,889
82	▼5	▼1	▼4	▼7	El Paso ISD	Texas	60,852	59,424	57,315	55,253	50,769
83	▲3	▲3	Steady	▲12	Manatee County	Florida	47,883	48,884	49,301	50,088	50,248
84	Steady	▲5	Steady	▲1	Atlanta	Georgia	51,145	51,927	52,377	52,416	49,994
85	▼1	▲5	Steady	▲2	Henrico County	Virginia	50,971	51,425	51,523	51,786	49,991
86	▼5	▼1	▼1	▼3	Plano ISD	Texas	54,689	54,173	53,057	52,629	49,400
87	▲8	▲7	▼1	▲7	Charleston, 01	South Carolina	46,790	48,551	49,769	50,299	49,331
88	▲1	▼7	▼1	▼7	Pasadena ISD	Texas	55,577	56,282	53,291	52,878	49,326
89	new	▲10	▲2	▲15	Rutherford County	Tennessee		44,149	46,303	47,458	49,253
90	Steady	▼1	Steady	▼4	Lewisville ISD	Texas	53,356	53,257	52,218	52,189	49,205
91	▲2	▼17	▲2	▼9	San Francisco Unified	California	58,414	60,133	52,498	52,811	49,204
92	▼4	▲4	▼1	▼2	Cumberland County	North Carolina	51,604	51,194	50,879	50,750	48,860
93	▲9	▲5	▲8	▼5	District of Columbia	District of Columbia	46,155	48,462	49,065	50,971	48,635
94	▼8	▲21	Steady	▼3	Detroit	Michigan	47,277	45,455	49,931	50,644	48,536
95	NR	new	▲3	▲8	Humble ISD	Texas			43,553	45,078	48,112
96	NR	NR	new	▲22	St. Johns County School District	Florida				43,628	48,032
97	▲4	▲6	Steady	▲5	Collier County	Florida	45,228	46,416	47,436	47,834	47,617
98	▲1	▲6	▲2	▲5	Socorro ISD	Texas	44,561	45,927	46,814	47,575	47,278
99	▲3	▲12	▲1	▼10	Round Rock ISD	Texas	47,251	48,321	50,387	50,953	47,167
100	▲3	▼2	▲5	▼4	Jefferson Parish	Louisiana	47,817	48,668	48,254	49,862	46,896
101	▼2	▲2	▼5	▼4	Wichita	Kansas	50,947	50,600	49,885	49,323	46,657
102	new	▲4	▲6	▲5	Horry County, 01	South Carolina			44,931	45,759	46,551
103	▼3	▼10	▼2	▼4	San Bernardino City Unified	California	53,365	53,152	49,005	48,755	46,509
104	▼4	▼6	▼5	▼11	Boston	Massachusetts	54,312	53,640	51,433	50,480	46,169
105	NR	new	Steady	▲10	Lake	Florida			43,941	44,793	45,845
106	▼2	▼3	Steady	▼8	Columbus City	Ohio	50,407	50,331	48,925	48,759	45,547
107	NR	NR	new	▲9	Frederick County Public Schools (Maryland)	Maryland				43,828	45,220
108	Steady	▲2	▲1	▲2	Hamilton County	Tennessee	43,797	44,446	45,052	45,342	45,176
109	▼1	▲4	Steady	▼9	Portland, SD1J	Oregon	47,806	48,173	48,710	48,601	45,171
110	▼8	▼11	▼2	▼9	San Antonio ISD	Texas	53,750	52,514	48,745	48,532	44,710
111	▲6	▲6	Steady	▼3	Chandler Unified	Arizona	42,252	44,352	45,968	45,749	43,923
112	NR	new	Steady	▲7	Sarasota	Florida			43,111	43,485	43,896
113	▼3	▲4	▲1	▼2	Killeen ISD	Texas	42,638	43,782	44,974	45,336	43,882
114	NR	NR	NR	new	St. Lucie Public Schools	Florida					43,612
115	▼4	▼4	▲1	▼9	Anchorage	Alaska	48,089	48,238	46,115	46,143	43,054
116	NR	NR	NR	new	Kern High School District	California					42,863
117	NR	NR	NR	new	Henry County Schools (Georgia)	Georgia					42, 792
118	▼4	▼20	▼2	▼13	Capistrano Unified	California	54,036	53,613	47,205	46,501	42,754
119	NR	new	▲1	▼2	Clovis Unified	California			43,264	43,654	42,699
120	▼4	Steady	▼(Dropped out of top 120)	▲(Returned to top 120)	Marion County Public Schools (Florida)	Florida					42,678

== Previously listed schools ==
2014 Rank	2016 Rank	2018 Rank	2019 Rank	School district	State/Territory	Students (autumn 2014)	Students (autumn 2016)	Students (autumn 2018)	Students (autumn 2019)
72	78	104	109	Santa Ana Unified	California	56,815	54,505	46,961	45,576
106	109	110	112	Alief ISD	Texas	47,202	46,376	45,436	45,300
97	105	109	114	Tucson Unified	Arizona	48,455	47,366	45,560	45,036
NR	NR	NR	120	Fayette County Public Schools (Kentucky)	Kentucky	N/A	N/A	N/A	43,342
98	106	114	Steady	Brownsville ISD	Texas	48,355	46,880	44,402	
115	119	117	Steady	United ISD	Texas	43,421	43,660	43,364	
100	96	Steady	Steady	Oakland Unified	California	48,077	49,760		
96	97	Steady	Steady	San Juan Unified	California	49,114	49,255		
107	107	Steady	Steady	Sacramento City Unified	California	46,868	46,815		
110	115	Steady	Steady	Garden Grove Unified	California	46,177	44,223		
117	Steady	Steady	Steady	Ysleta ISD	Texas	42,488			
119	Steady	Steady	Steady	Riverside Unified	California	42,339			
