= Cuckoo-hawk =

Cuckoo-hawk may refer to either of two bird species:

- African cuckoo-hawk
- Madagascar cuckoo-hawk

== See also ==
- Hawk-cuckoo
