= St. Croix Educational Complex =

Location
- Rural Route No. 2 Kingshill, St. Croix 00850; 17.7230845°N 64.8006801°W

Information
- Funding type: Public
- School district: St. Croix School District
- Principal: Rodney Moorehead
- Staff: approximately 120+
- Grades: 9–12
- Enrollment: 980 (2026)
- Campus: Rural
- Colors: Blue and silver
- Mascot: Barracuda
- Feeder schools: Eulalie R. Rivera PreK-8 School; John H. Woodson Junior High School
- School Hours: 7:40 AM to 2:30 PM
- Average Class Size: 20+

The St. Croix Educational Complex, also known as Complex, is one of two public high schools located on the island of St. Croix in the United States Virgin Islands. It is operated by the St. Croix School District.

It serves students that live in the western side area of the island. St. Croix Educational Complex was opened on September 5, 1995.

== Principals ==
- Kurt Vialet: 1995-2011
- Willard John: 2011-2015
- Genitta Richards: 2015-2019
- Rodney Moorehead: 2019-Present
