= St. Croix Central High School (Virgin Islands) =

Location
- RFD #2 Kingshill; Kingshill, St. Croix 00851; 17°43′31″N 64°46′57″W

Information
- Funding type: Public
- Motto: "Knowledge is Power."
- Founded: 1967 (59 years ago)
- School district: St. Croix School District
- CEEB code: 550120
- Principal: Yves Abraham ED.S.
- Staff: Approximately 120+
- Grades: 9–12
- Enrollment: 1,350 (2007)
- Hours in school day: 7
- Campus type: Rural
- Colors: Burgundy and white
- Mascot: Caribs
- Feeder schools: John H. Woodson Junior High School
- Website: Official Website

St. Croix Central High School, commonly referred to as "Central High" or "Central," is the largest public high school located on the island Saint Croix in the United States Virgin Islands. The school is operated by the St. Croix School District.

== History ==
St Croix Central High School opened in 1967 as a successor to Christiansted High School which was established in 1935. The original building in Christiansted is now the V.I. Department of Education Building, St. Croix District. In 1968, the school held its first graduation ceremony of which one hundred fifty seniors received their diplomas. Today, Central High has an enrollment of approximately 1,400 students in grades ninth through twelve with an average of over 200 students graduating annually . Central High is also noted for its crosstown rivalry with the St. Croix Educational Complex Barracudas which opened around 1995 and is still a fairly recent rivalry compared to multiple decades Central has been the singular big public high school in St.Croix.

== Campus ==
Central High is located near the Queen Mary Highway, the facility encompasses forty-two acres with twenty buildings. It is also located near the Kingshill Cemetery. Central High School is also home to the Ronald Charles Gymnasium which is the largest indoor sports venue on the island of St. Croix. The gymnasium is used to play its basketball games, its volleyball games, school activities, assemblies, seminars, and has even hosted an ice show.

== Athletics ==
Each year students have an opportunity to participate on a number of athletic teams and events. Sports are organized at the varsity and junior varsity levels. the following sports are offered at Central High School.

- Men's Basketball
- Women's Basketball
- Men's Volleyball
- Women's Volleyball
- Baseball and Softball
- American football
- Track and Field
- Soccer
- Tennis
- Golf
- Cheerleading
- Marching band

== Athletic rivalries ==
Central High's official athletic rival is the St. Croix Educational Complex Barracudas, but the school also has a longtime inter-island athletic rivalry with the Charlotte Amalie High School Chickenhawks and the Ivanna Eudora Kean High School Devil Rays.

== Academic requirements ==
All students must have a minimum of 26 credits and an overall average of at least 70% to graduate. Courses required are:

- English- 6 total credits
- Math- 3 total credits
- Social Studies- 4 total credits
- Foreign Language- 2 total credits
- Science- 3 total credits
- Physical Education- 3 total credits
- Computer Science- 1 total credit
- Pre-Vocational/Electives- 4 total credits

Credits are awarded for courses on a semester basis; no final grade will be averaged. Grades alone are not the sole indicator of a successful completion of a course. Based on graduation requirements, the following minimum totals are required for promotion to the next grade level:

- Sophomores- 6 earned credits
- Juniors- 12 earned credits
- Seniors- 18 earned credits
- Completion of High School - 26 or more earned credits which would meet with the V.I. Board of Education requirements.
