= List of school districts in the United States Virgin Islands =

This is a complete listing of school districts in the Territory of the United States Virgin Islands:

- St. Croix School District - District Website
- St. Thomas-St. John School District - District Website

== See also ==
- University of the Virgin Islands
