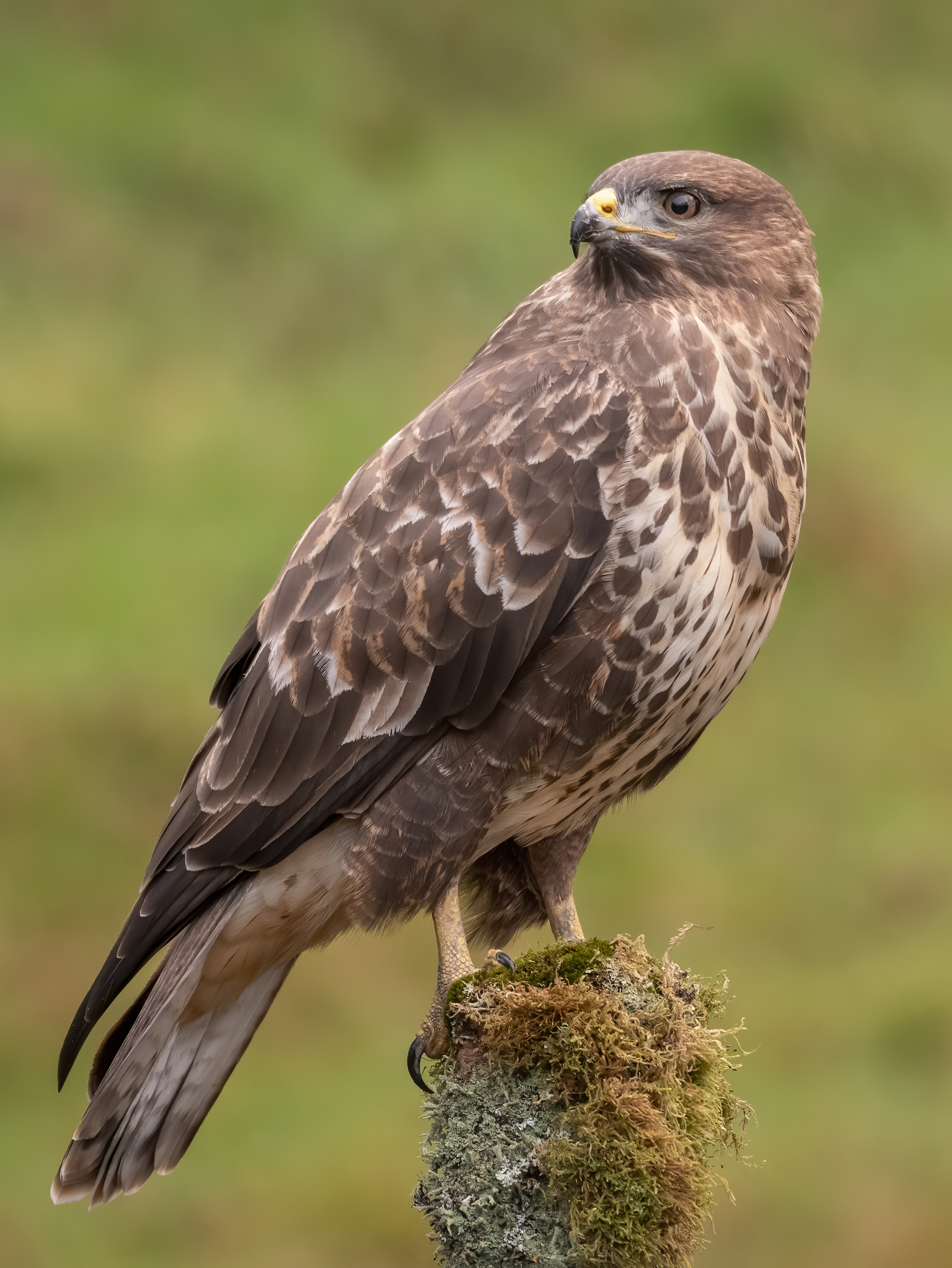
- Nominate B. b. buteo, Scotland

Conservation status
- Least Concern (IUCN 3.1)

Scientific classification
- Kingdom: Animalia
- Phylum: Chordata
- Class: Aves
- Order: Accipitriformes
- Family: Accipitridae
- Genus: Buteo
- Species: B. buteo

Binomial name
- Buteo buteo (Linnaeus, 1758)

Subspecies
- 7–10, see text
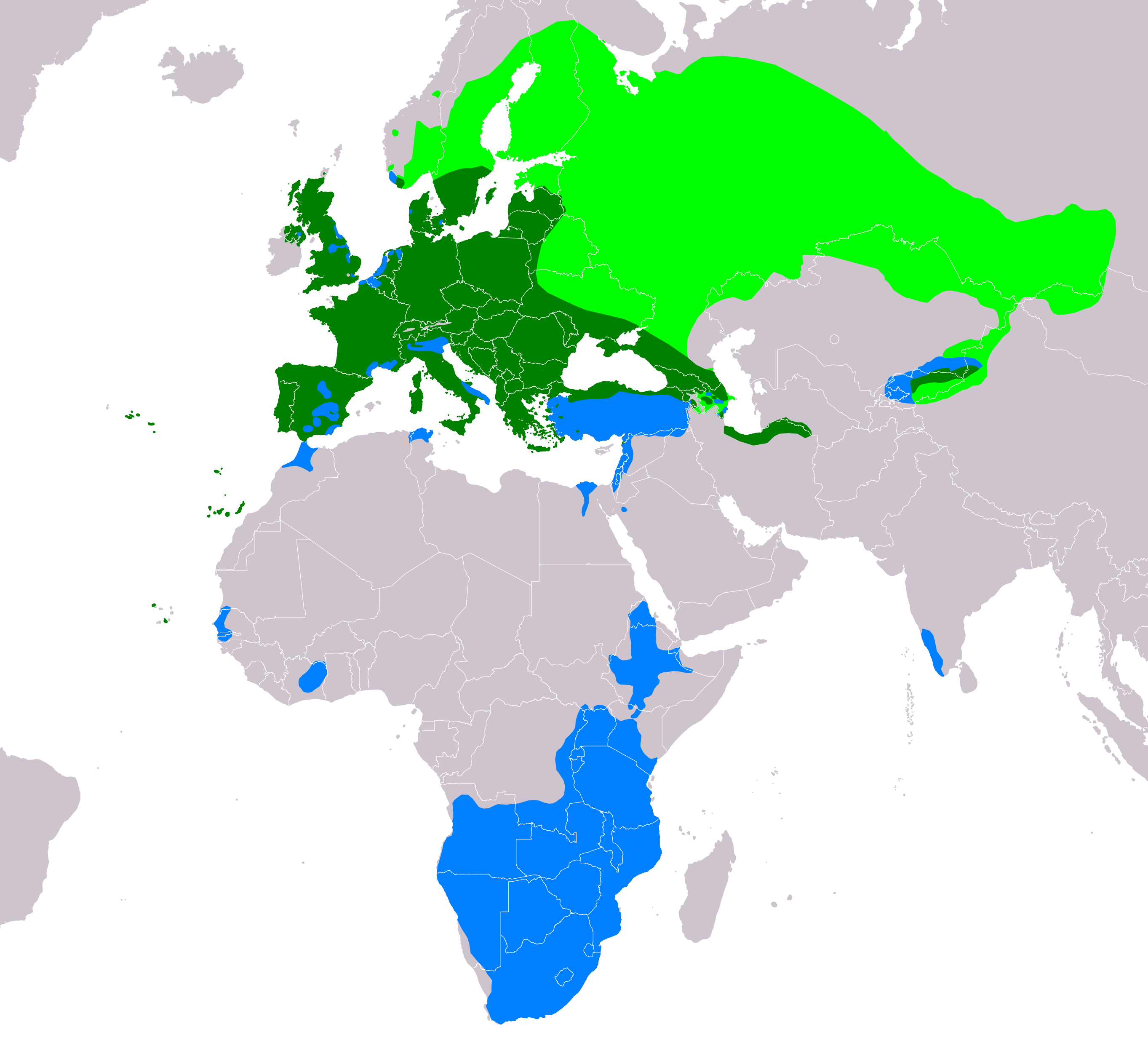
- Range of B. buteo Breeding range of migrant populations Resident range Wintering range of migrant populations

Synonyms
- Falco buteo Linnaeus, 1758

= Common buzzard =

Species of bird of prey

The common buzzard (Buteo buteo) is a medium-sized bird of prey with a large range. It is a member of the genus Buteo in the family Accipitridae. The species lives in most of Europe and extends its breeding range across much of the Palearctic as far as northwestern China (Tian Shan), far western Siberia and northwestern Mongolia. Over much of its range, it is a year-round resident. However, buzzards from the colder parts of the Northern Hemisphere as well as those that breed in the eastern part of their range typically migrate south for the northern winter, many journeying as far as South Africa.

The common buzzard is an opportunistic predator that can take a wide variety of prey, but it feeds mostly on small mammals, especially rodents such as voles. It typically hunts from a perch. Like most accipitrid birds of prey, it builds a nest, typically in trees in this species, and is a devoted parent to a relatively small brood of young. The common buzzard appears to be the most common diurnal raptor in Europe, as estimates of its total global population run well into the millions.

== Taxonomy ==
The first formal description of the common buzzard was by the Swedish naturalist Carl Linnaeus in 1758 in the tenth edition of his Systema Naturae under the binomial name Falco buteo. The genus Buteo was introduced by the French naturalist Bernard Germain de Lacépède in 1799 by tautonymy with the specific name of this species. The word buteo is Latin for a buzzard. It should not be confused with the turkey vulture, which is sometimes called a buzzard in American English.

The Buteoninae subfamily originated from and is most diversified in the Americas, with occasional broader radiations that led to common buzzards and other Eurasian and African buzzards. The common buzzard is a member of the genus Buteo, a group of medium-sized raptors with robust bodies and broad wings. The Buteo species of Eurasia and Africa are usually commonly referred to as "buzzards" while those in the Americas are called hawks. Under current classification, the genus includes approximately 28 species, the second most diverse of all extant accipitrid genera behind only Accipiter. DNA testing shows that the common buzzard is fairly closely related to the red-tailed hawk (Buteo jamaicensis) of North America, which occupies a similar ecological niche to the buzzard in that continent. The two species may belong to the same species complex. Three buzzards in Africa are likely closely related to the common buzzard based on genetic materials, the mountain buzzard (Buteo oreophilus), forest buzzard (Buteo trizonatus), and the Madagascar buzzard (Buteo brachypterus), to the point where it has been questioned whether they are sufficiently distinct to qualify as full species. However, the distinctiveness of these African buzzards has generally been supported. Genetic studies have further indicated that the modern buzzards of Eurasia and Africa are a relatively young group, showing that they diverged at about 300,000 years ago. Nonetheless, fossils dating earlier than 5 million year old (the late Miocene period) showed Buteo species were present in Europe much earlier than that would imply, although it cannot be stated to a certainty that these would have been related to the extant buzzards.

=== Subspecies and species splits ===
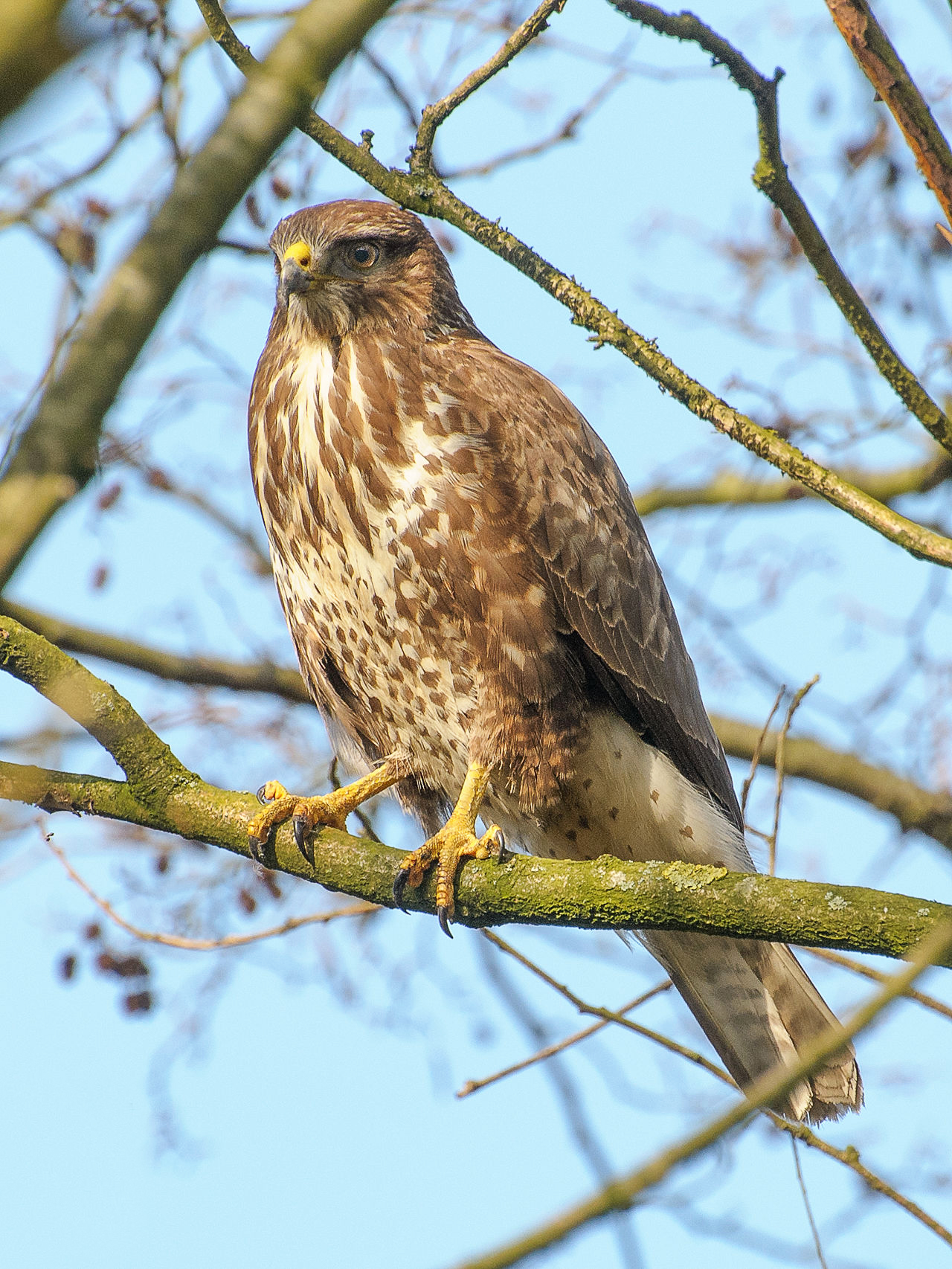
A typical intermediate brown buzzard of the nominate subspecies (B. b. buteo) in the Netherlands

Some 16 subspecies have been described in the past and up to 11 are often considered valid, although currently, only six are accepted by the IOC World Bird List and seven by the 2025 Avilist. Common buzzard subspecies fall into two groups.

The western buteo group is mainly resident or short-distance migrants and includes:

- B. b. buteo (Linnaeus, 1758): Ranges in Europe from the Atlantic islands, the British Isles and the Iberian Peninsula (including Madeira Island, whose population was once considered a separate subspecies, B. b. harterti) more or less continuously throughout Europe to Finland, Romania and Asia Minor. This highly individually variable subspecies is described below. This is a relatively large and bulky subspecies. In males, the wing chord ranges from 350 to 418 mm (13.8 to 16.5 in) and the tail from 194 to 223 mm (7.6 to 8.8 in). In comparison, the larger female has a wing chord measuring 374 to 432 mm (14.7 to 17.0 in) and tail length of 193 to 236 mm (7.6 to 9.3 in). In both sexes, the tarsus measures 69 to 83 mm (2.7 to 3.3 in) in length. As illustrated by average body mass, sizes in the nominate subspecies of common buzzard seem to confirm to Bergmann's rule, increasing to the north and decreasing closer to the Equator. In southern Norway, the mean weight of males was reportedly 740 g (1.63 lb), while that of females was 1,100 g (2.4 lb). British buzzards were of intermediate size, 214 males averaging 781 g (1.722 lb) and 261 females averaging 969 g (2.136 lb). Birds to the south in Spain were smaller, averaging 662 g (1.459 lb) in 22 males and 800 g (1.8 lb) in 30 females. Cramp and Simmons (1980) listed the mean body mass overall of nominate buzzards in Europe overall as 828 g (1.825 lb) in males and 1,052 g (2.319 lb) in females.

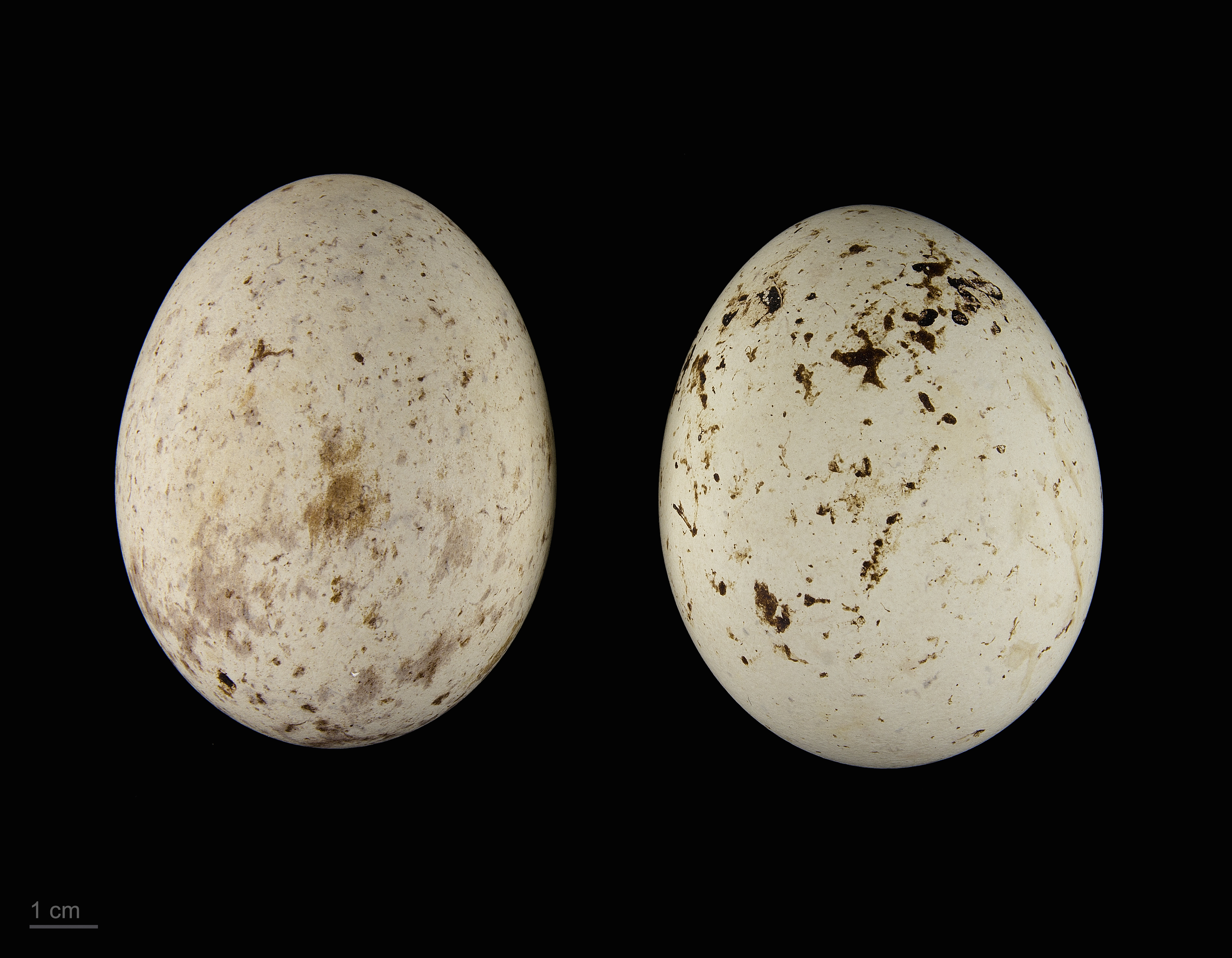
Buteo buteo rothschildi eggs, Muséum de Toulouse, France

- B. b. rothschildi Swann, 1919: This proposed subspecies is native to the Azores islands. It is generally considered a valid subspecies. This subspecies differs from a typical intermediate of the nominate in being a darker, colder brown both above and below, closer to the darker individuals of the nominate. It averages smaller than most nominate buzzards. The wing chord of males ranges from 343 to 365 mm (13.5 to 14.4 in) while that of females ranges from 362 to 393 mm (14.3 to 15.5 in).
- B. b. insularum Floericke, 1903: This subspecies lives in the Canary Islands. Not all authorities consider this subspecies suitably distinct, but others advocate it be retained as a full subspecies. It is typically of richer brown above and more heavily streaked below compared to nominate birds. It is similar in size to B. b. rothschildi and averages slightly smaller than the nominate subspecies. Males have a reported wing chord of 352 to 390 mm (13.9 to 15.4 in) and females have a wing chord of 370 to 394 mm (14.6 to 15.5 in).
- B. b. pojana (Savi, 1831), syn. B. b. arrigonii Picchi 1903: This subspecies inhabits the islands of Corsica and Sardinia. It is generally considered a valid subspecies. The upper-side of these buzzards is an intermediate brown with very heavy streaking below, often covering the belly whereas most nominate buzzards show a whitish area the middle of the belly. Like most other insular subspecies, this one is relatively small. Males possess a wing chord of 343 to 382 mm (13.5 to 15.0 in) while females have a wing chord of 353 to 390 mm (13.9 to 15.4 in).

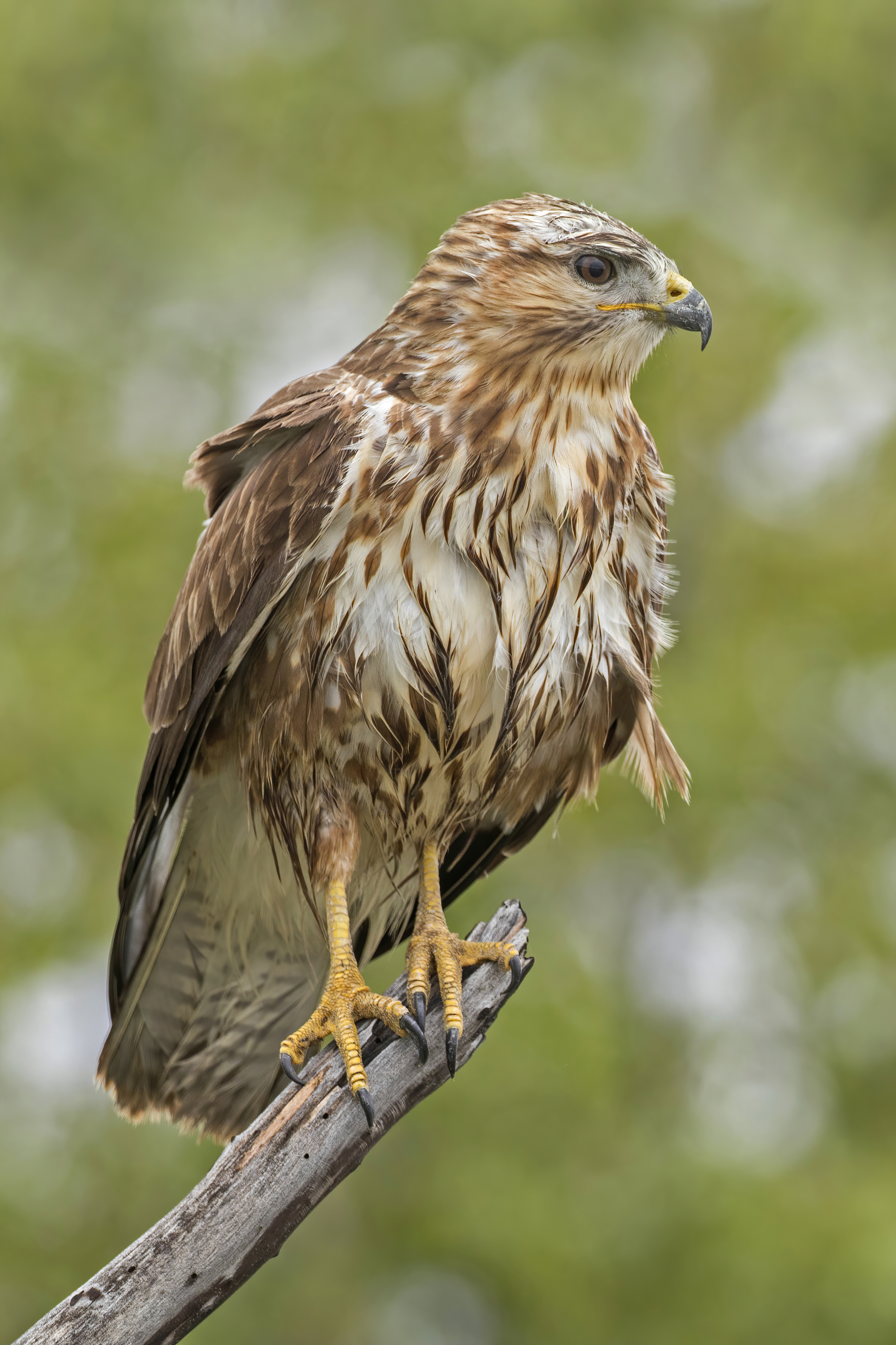
The steppe subspecies of the common buzzard (B. b. vulpinus) is usually distinguished from the nominate subspecies (B. b. buteo) by being more rufous in hue, and more polymorphic. A wintering bird in Etosha, Namibia.

The eastern vulpinus group includes:

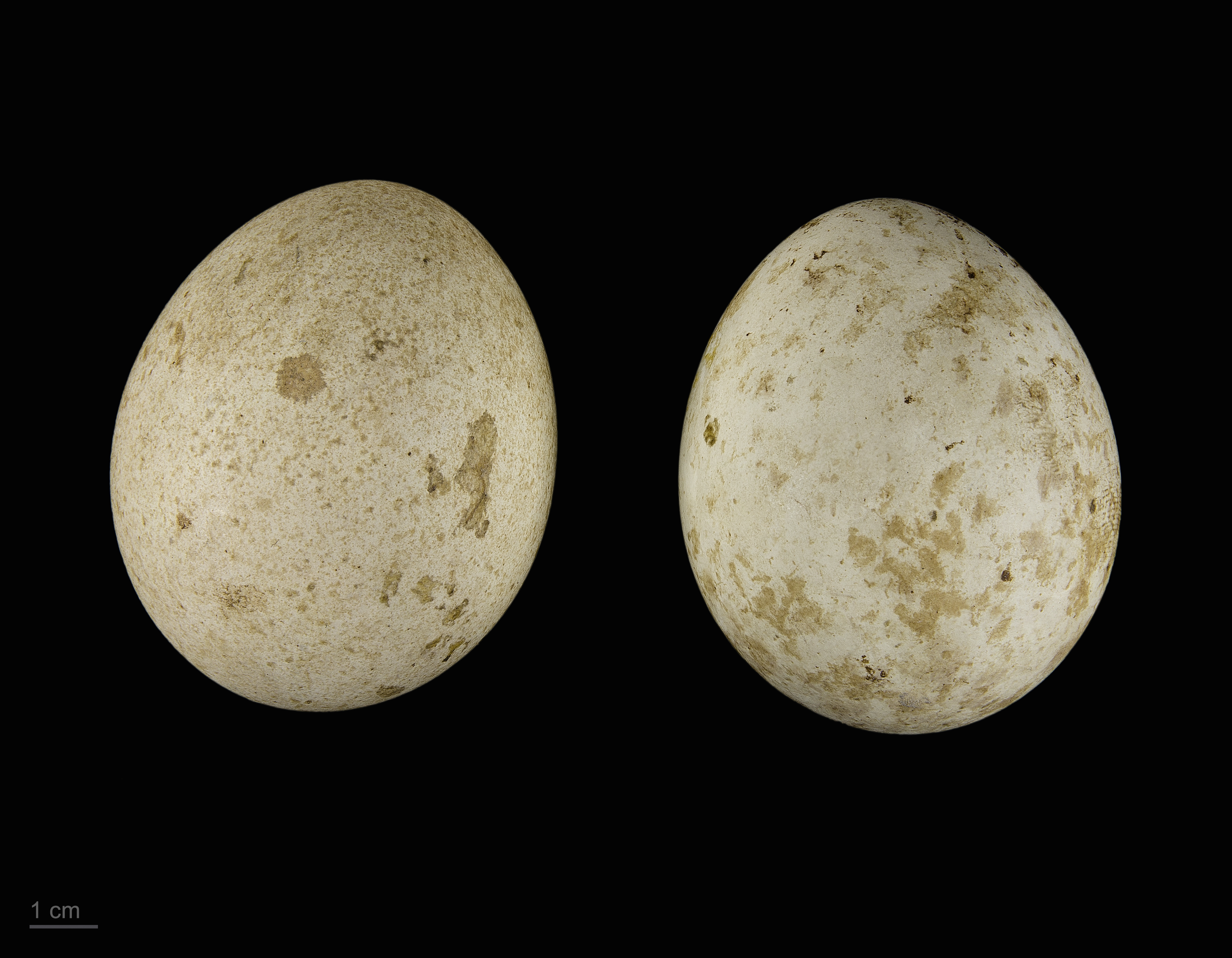
Buteo buteo vulpinus eggs, Muséum de Toulouse, France

- B. b. vulpinus (Gloger, 1833): The steppe buzzard breeds as far west as eastern Sweden, in the southern two-thirds of Finland, eastern Estonia, much of Belarus and Ukraine, eastward to the northern Caucacus, northern Kazakhstan, Kyrgyzstan, much of Russia to Altai and south-central Siberia, Tien Shan in China and western Mongolia. B. b. vulpinus is a long-distance migrant. It winters largely in much of eastern and southern Africa. Less frequently and often very discontinuously, steppe buzzards winter in the southern peninsulas of Europe, Arabia and southwestern India in addition to some parts of southeastern Kazakhstan, Uzbekistan and Kyrgyzstan. In the open country favoured on the wintering grounds, steppe buzzards are often seen perched on roadside telephone poles. It at one time was considered a separate species due to differences in size, form, colouring and behaviour (especially in regards to migratory behaviour) but is genetically indistinct from nominate buzzards. Furthermore, the steppe buzzard engages in extensive interbreeding with the nominate subspecies, causing typical characteristics of the two subspecies to mix. The zone of integration runs from Scandinavia through the European continent to the Black Sea, including any part of the overlapping ranges in Sweden, Finland, Estonia, Latvia, Lithuania, western Ukraine and eastern Romania. At times, the fertile hybrids of these two subspecies have been erroneously proposed as subspecies such as B. b. intermedius or B. b. zimmermannae. Intergrade buzzards are commonest where the grey-brown type of pale morphs of B. b. vulpinus are predominant. Steppe buzzards are usually distinctly smaller, with relatively longer wings and tail for their size, and thus often appear swifter and more agile in flight than nominate buzzards, whose wing beats can look slower and clumsier. Typically, their length is around 45 to 50 cm (18 to 20 in), while wingspan of males average 113 cm (44 in) and females average 122.7 cm (48 in). The wing chord is 335 to 377 mm (13.2 to 14.8 in) in males and 358 to 397 mm (14.1 to 15.6 in) in females. Tail length is 170 to 200 mm (6.7 to 7.9 in) in males and 175 to 209 mm (6.9 to 8.2 in) in females. Weights of birds from Russia can reportedly range from 560 to 675 g (1.235 to 1.488 lb) in males and 710 to 1,180 g (1.57 to 2.60 lb) in females. Weights of migrant birds appear to be lower than at other times of year for steppe buzzards. Two surveys of migrant buzzards during their huge spring movement in Eilat, Israel showed 420 birds averaged 579 g (1.276 lb) and 882 birds averaged 578 g (1.274 lb). In comparison, weights of wintering steppe buzzards was higher, averaging 725 g (1.598 lb) in 35 birds in the former Transvaal (South Africa) and 739 g (1.629 lb) in 160 birds in the Cape Province. Weights of birds from Zambia were similar.
- B. b. menetriesi Bogdanov, 1879: This subspecies is found in southern Crimea through the Caucasus to northern Iran and possibly into Turkey. This subspecies has traditionally been listed as a resident, but some sources consider it a migrant to eastern and southern Africa. Compared to the overlapping steppe buzzard subspecies, it is larger (roughly intermediate between the nominate subspecies and B. b. vulpinus) and is duller in overall colour, being sandy below rather than rufous and lacking the bright rufous on the tail. Wing chord is 351 to 397 mm (13.8 to 15.6 in) in males and 372 to 413 mm (14.6 to 16.3 in) in females.

At one time, subspecies of the common buzzard were thought to range as far in Asia as a breeding bird well into the Himalayas and as far east as northeastern China, Russia to the Sea of Okhotsk, and all the islands of the Kurile Islands and of Japan, despite both the Himalayan and eastern birds showing a natural gap in distribution from the next nearest breeding common buzzard. However, DNA testing has revealed that the buzzards of these populations probably belong to different species. Most authorities now accept these buzzards as full species, the eastern buzzard (Buteo japonicus; with three subspecies of its own) and the Himalayan buzzard (Buteo refectus). Buzzards found on the islands of Cape Verde off of the coast of western Africa, once referred to as the subspecies B. b. bannermani (and again recently by the avilist), and Socotra Island off of the northern peninsula of Arabia, once referred to as the rarely recognised subspecies B. b. socotrae, are now generally thought not to belong to the common buzzard. DNA testing has indicated that these insular buzzards are actually more closely related to the long-legged buzzard (Buteo rufinus) than to the common buzzard. Subsequently, some researchers have advocated full species status for the Cape Verde population, but the placement of these buzzards is generally deemed unclear.

== Description ==
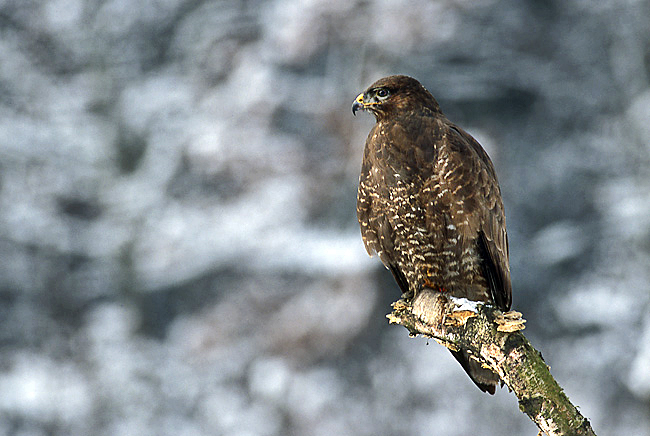
A dark individual from Europe

The common buzzard is a medium-sized raptor that is highly variable in plumage. Most buzzards are distinctly round headed with a somewhat slender bill, relatively long wings that either reach or fall slightly short of the tail tip when perched, a fairly short tail, and somewhat short and mainly bare tarsi. They can appear fairly compact in overall appearance but may also appear large relative to other more common raptorial birds such as kestrels and sparrowhawks. The common buzzard measures between 40 and 58 cm (1 ft 4 in and 1 ft 11 in) in length with a 109–140 cm (3 ft 7 in – 4 ft 7 in) wingspan. Females average about 2–7% larger than males linearly and weigh about 15% more. Body mass can show considerable variation. Buzzards from Great Britain alone can vary from 427 to 1,183 g (15 oz to 2 lb 10 oz) in males, while females there can range from 486 to 1,370 g (1 lb 1 oz to 3 lb 0 oz).

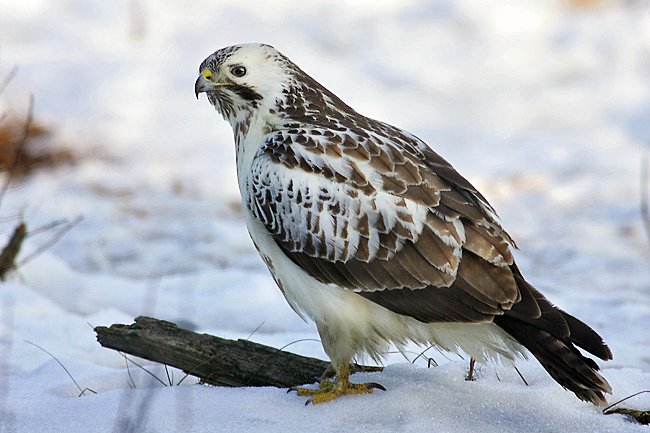
A pale individual in Europe

In Europe, most typical buzzards are dark brown above and on the upperside of the head and mantle, but can become paler and warmer brown with worn plumage. The flight feathers on perched European buzzards are always brown in the nominate subspecies (B. b. buteo). Usually the tail will be narrowly barred grey-brown and dark brown with a pale tip and a broad dark subterminal band but the tail in palest birds can show a varying amount a white and reduced subterminal band or even appear almost all white. In European buzzards, the underside colour can be variable but most typically shows a brown-streaked white throat with a somewhat darker chest. A pale U across breast is often present; followed by a pale line running down the belly which separates the dark areas on breast-side and flanks. These pale areas tend to have highly variable markings that tend to form irregular bars. Juvenile buzzards are quite similar to adult in the nominate subspecies, being best told apart by having a paler eye, a narrower subterminal band on the tail and underside markings that appear as streaks rather than bars. Furthermore, juveniles may show variable creamy to rufous fringes to upperwing coverts but these also may not be present. Seen from below in flight, buzzards in Europe typically have a dark trailing edge to the wings. If seen from above, one of the best marks is their broad dark subterminal tail band. Flight feathers of typical European buzzards are largely greyish, the aforementioned dark wing linings at front with contrasting paler band along the median coverts. In flight, paler individuals tend to show dark carpal patches that can appears as blackish arches or commas but these may be indistinct in darker individuals or can appear light brownish or faded in paler individuals. Juvenile nominate buzzards are best told apart from adults in flight by the lack of a distinct subterminal band (instead showing fairly even barring throughout) and below by having less sharp and brownish rather than blackish trailing wing edge. Juvenile buzzards show streaking paler parts of under wing and body showing rather than barring as do adults. Beyond the typical mid-range brownish buzzard, birds in Europe can range from almost uniform black-brown above to mainly white. Extreme dark individuals may range from chocolate brown to blackish with almost no pale showing but a variable, faded U on the breast and with or without faint lighter brown throat streaks. Extreme pale birds are largely whitish with variable widely spaced streaks or arrowheads of light brown about the mid-chest and flanks and may or may not show dark feather-centres on the head, wing-coverts and sometimes all but part of mantle. Individuals can show nearly endless variation of colours and hues in between these extremes and the common buzzard is counted among the most variably plumage diurnal raptors for this reason. One study showed that this variation may actually be the result of diminished single-locus genetic diversity.

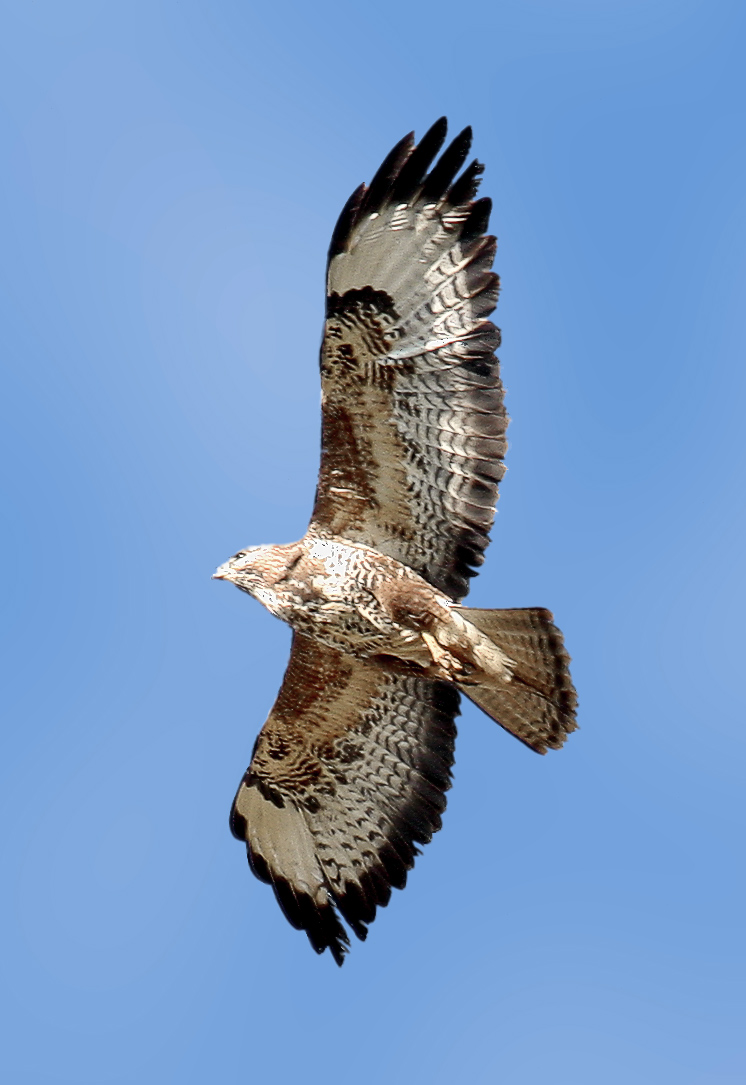
Although they can look compact when perched, buzzards may appear large and long-winged in flight.

Beyond the nominate form (B. b. buteo) that occupies most of the common buzzard's European range, a second main, widely distributed subspecies is known as the steppe buzzard (B. b. vulpinus). The steppe buzzard shows three main colour morphs, each of which can be predominant in a region of breeding range. It is more distinctly polymorphic rather than just individually very variable like the nominate subspecies. This may be because, unlike the nominate buzzard, the steppe buzzard is highly migratory. Polymorphism has been linked with migratory behaviour. The most common type of steppe buzzard is the rufous morph which gives this subspecies its scientific name (vulpes is Latin for "fox"). This morph comprises a majority of birds seen in passage east of the Mediterranean. Rufous morph buzzards are a paler grey-brown above than most nominate B. b. buteo. Compared to the nominate subspecies, rufous B. b. vulpinus show a patterning not dissimilar but generally far more rufous-toned on head, the fringes to mantle wing coverts and, especially, on the tail and the underside. The head is grey-brown with rufous tinges usually while the tail is rufous and can vary from almost unmarked to thinly dark-barred with a subterminal band. The underside can be uniformly pale to dark rufous, barred heavily or lightly with rufous or with dusky barring, usually with darker individuals showing the U as in nominate but with a rufous hue. The pale morph of the steppe buzzard is commonest in the west of its subspecies range, predominantly seen in winter and migration at the various land bridge of the Mediterranean. As in the rufous morph, the pale morph B. b. vulpinus is grey-brown above but the tail is generally marked with thin dark bars and a subterminal band, only showing rufous near the tip. The underside in the pale morph is greyish-white with dark grey-brown or somewhat streaked head to chest and barred belly and chest, occasionally showing darker flanks that can be somewhat rufous. Dark morph B. b. vulpinus tend to be found in the east and southeast of the subspecies range and are easily outnumbered by rufous morph while largely using similar migration points. Dark morph individuals vary from grey-brown to much darker blackish-brown, and have a tail that is dark grey or somewhat mixed grey and rufous, is distinctly marked with dark barring and has a broad, black subterminal band. Dark morph B. b. vulpinus have a head and underside that is mostly uniform dark, from dark brown to blackish-brown to almost pure black. Rufous morph juveniles are often distinctly paler in ground colour (ranging even to creamy-grey) than adults with distinct barring below actually increased in pale morph type juvenile. Pale and rufous morph juveniles can only be distinguished from each other in extreme cases. Dark morph juveniles are more similar to adult dark morph B. b. vulpinus but often show a little whitish streaking below, and like all other subspecies have lighter coloured eyes and more evenly barred tails than adults. Steppe buzzards tend to appear smaller and more agile in flight than nominate whose wing beats can look slower and clumsier. In flight, rufous morph B. b. vulpinus have their whole body and underwing varying from uniform to patterned rufous (if patterning present, it is variable, but can be on chest and often thighs, sometimes flanks, pale band across median coverts), while the under-tail usually paler rufous than above. Whitish flight feathers are more prominent than in nominate and more marked contrast with the bold dark brown band along the trailing edges. Markings of pale B. b. vulpinus as seen in flight are similar to rufous morph (such as paler wing markings) but more greyish both on wings and body. In dark morph B. b. vulpinus the broad black trailing edges and colour of body make whitish areas of inner wing stand out further with an often bolder and blacker carpal patch than in other morphs. As in nominate, juvenile B. b. vulpinus (rufous/pale) tend to have much less distinct trailing edges, general streaking on body and along median underwing coverts. Dark morph B. b. vulpinus resemble adult in flight more so than other morphs.

Recently, the variability in common buzzard plumage has declined, with fewer markedly pale or dark individuals occurring, and more intermediate plumage, in a wide study across Europe covering the period 2000–2022. The reasons for this change remain unknown.

=== Similar species ===
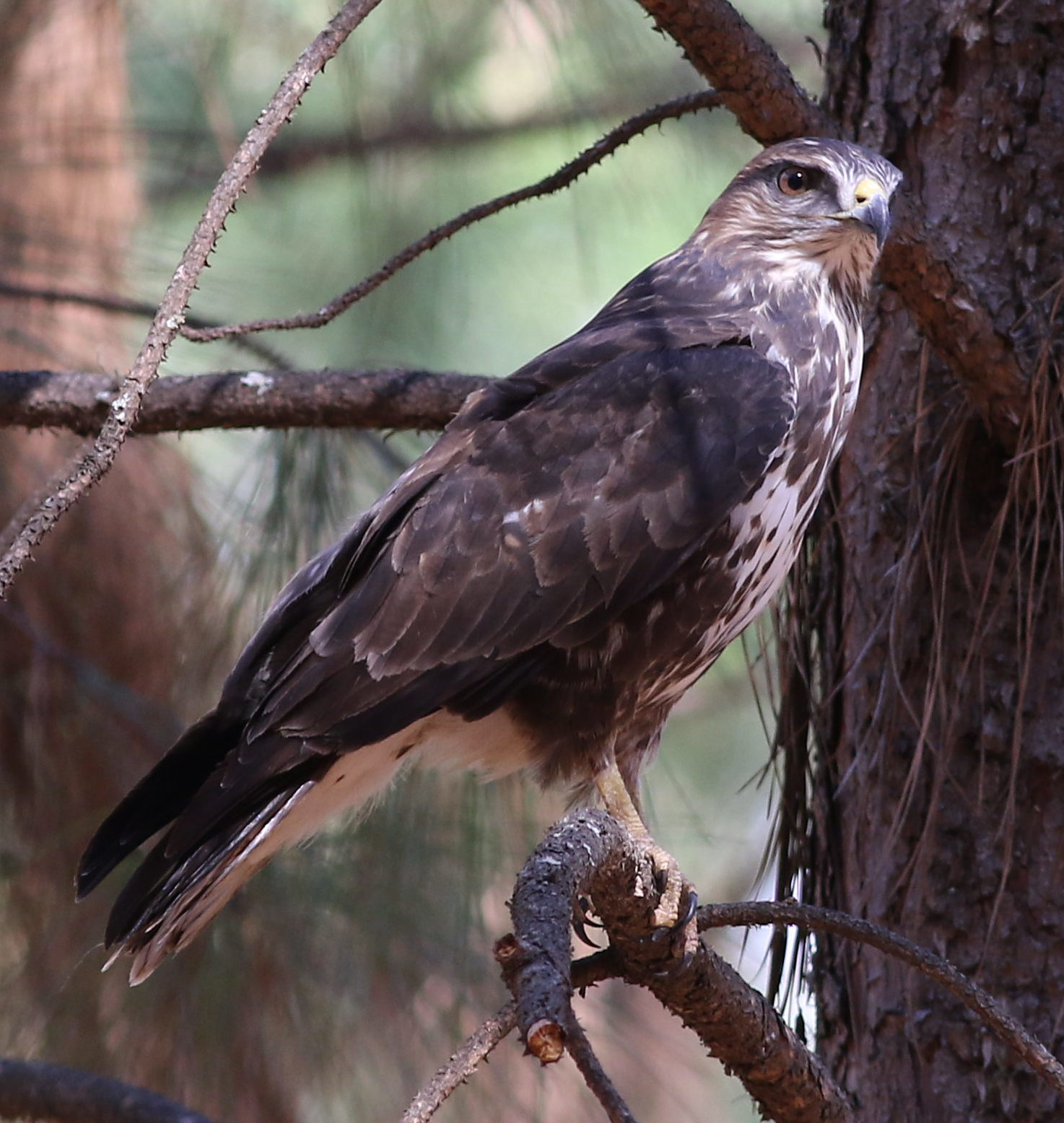
Juvenile forest buzzards of Africa are extremely easy to mistake for juvenile common buzzards of the steppe subspecies that come to winter in Africa.

The common buzzard is often confused with other raptors especially in flight or at a distance. Inexperienced and over-enthusiastic observers have even mistaken darker birds for the far larger and differently proportioned golden eagle (Aquila chrysaetos) and also dark birds for western marsh harrier (Circus aeruginosus) which also flies in a dihedral but is obviously relatively much longer and slenderer winged and tailed and with far different flying methods. Also buzzards may possibly be confused with dark or light morph booted eagles (Hieraeetus pennatus), which are similar in size, but the eagle flies on level, parallel-edged wings which usually appear broader, has a longer squarer tail, with no carpal patch in pale birds and all dark flight feathers but for whitish wedge on inner primaries in dark morph ones. Pale individuals are sometimes also mistaken with pale morph short-toed eagles (Circaetus gallicus) which are much larger with a considerably bigger head, longer wings (which are usually held evenly in flight rather than in a dihedral) and paler underwing lacking any carpal patch or dark wing lining.

More serious identification concerns lie in other Buteo species and in flight with honey buzzards, which are quite different looking when seen perched at close range. The European honey buzzard (Pernis apivorus) is thought to engage in mimicry of more powerful raptors, in particular, juveniles may mimic the plumage of the more powerful common buzzard. While less individually variable in Europe, the honey buzzard is more extensively polymorphic on underparts than even the common buzzard. The most common morph of the adult European honey buzzard is heavily barred and rufous on the underside, quite different from the common buzzard, however the brownish juvenile much more resembles an intermediate common buzzard. Honey buzzards flap with distinctively slower and more even wing beats than common buzzards. The wings are also lifted higher on each upstroke, creating a more regular and mechanical effect, furthermore their wings are held slightly arched when soaring but not in a V-shape. On the honey buzzard, the head appears smaller, the body thinner, the tail longer and the wings narrower and more parallel-edged. The steppe buzzard is particularly often mistaken for juvenile European honey buzzards, to the point where early observers of raptor migration in Israel considered distant individuals indistinguishable. However, when compared to a steppe buzzard, the honey buzzard has distinctly darker secondaries on the underwing with fewer and broader bars and more extensive black wing-tips (whole fingers) contrasting with a less extensively pale hand. Found in the same range as the steppe buzzard in some parts of southern Siberia as well as (with wintering steppes) in southwestern India, the Oriental honey buzzard (Pernis ptilorhynchus) is larger than both the European honey buzzard and the common buzzard. The Oriental species is more similar in body plan to common buzzards, being relatively broader winged, shorter tailed and more amply-headed (though the head is still relatively small) relative to the European honey buzzard, but all plumages lack carpal patches.

In much of Europe, the common buzzard is the only species of Buteo present. However, the subarctic breeding rough-legged buzzard (Buteo lagopus) comes down to occupy much of the northern part of the continent during winter in the same haunts as the common buzzard. However, the rough-legged buzzard is typically larger and distinctly longer-winged with feathered legs, as well as having a white based tail with a broad subterminal band. Rough-legged buzzards have slower wing beats and hover far more frequently than do common buzzards. The carpal patch marking on the under-wing are also bolder and blacker on all paler forms of the rough-legged buzzard. Many pale morph rough-legged buzzards have a bold, blackish band across the belly against contrasting paler feathers, a feature which rarely appears in individual common buzzard. Usually the face also appears somewhat whitish in most pale morphs of rough-legged buzzards, which is true of only extremely pale common buzzards. Dark morph rough-legged buzzards are usually distinctly darker (ranging to almost blackish) than even extreme dark individuals of common buzzards in Europe and still have the distinct white-based tail and broad subterminal band of other roughlegs. In eastern Europe and much of the Asian range of common buzzards, the long-legged buzzard (Buteo rufinus) may live alongside the common species. As in the steppe buzzard, the long-legged buzzard has three main colour morphs that are more or less similar in hue. In both the steppe buzzard and long-legged buzzard, the main colour is overall fairly rufous. More so than steppe buzzards, long-legged buzzards tend to have a distinctly paler head and neck compared to other feathers, and, more distinctly, a normally unbarred tail. Furthermore, the long-legged buzzard is usually a rather larger bird, often considered fairly eagle-like in appearance (although it does appear gracile and small-billed even compared to smaller true eagles), an effect enhanced by its longer tarsi, somewhat longer neck and relatively elongated wings. The flight style of the latter species is deeper, slower and more aquiline, with much more frequent hovering, showing a more protruding head and a slightly higher V held in a soar.

The smaller North African and Arabian subspecies of long-legged buzzard (B. r. cirtensis) is more similar in size and nearly all colour characteristics to steppe buzzard, extending to the heavily streaked juvenile plumage, in some cases such birds can be distinguished only by their proportions and flight patterns which remain unchanged. Hybridisation with the latter subspecies (B. r. cirtensis) and nominate common buzzards has been observed in the Strait of Gibraltar, a few such birds have been reported potentially in the southern Mediterranean due to mutually encroaching ranges, which are blurring possibly due to climate change. The taxonomic position of B. r. cirtensis however remains uncertain; some genetic data suggest that it is more closely related to common buzzard than it is to Buteo rufinus rufinus, and should be reclassified as Buteo buteo cirtensis. This reclassification has been accepted by the Ornithological Society of the Middle East, and the Collins Bird Guide, but not by the IOC World Bird List or the Avilist.

Wintering steppe buzzards may live alongside mountain buzzards and especially with forest buzzards while wintering in Africa. The juveniles of steppe and forest buzzards are more or less indistinguishable and only told apart by proportions and flight style, the latter species being smaller, more compact, having a smaller bill, shorter legs and shorter and thinner wings than a steppe buzzard. However, size is not diagnostic unless side by side as the two buzzards overlap in this regard. Most reliable are the species wing proportions and their flight actions. Forest buzzard have more flexible wing beats interspersed with glides, additionally soaring on flatter wings and apparently never engage in hovering. Adult forest buzzards compared to the typical adult steppe buzzard (rufous morph) are also similar, but the forest typically has a whiter underside, sometimes mostly plain white, usually with heavy blotches or drop-shaped marks on abdomen, with barring on thighs, more narrow tear-shaped on chest and more spotted on leading edges of underwing, usually lacking marking on the white U across chest (which is otherwise similar but usually broader than that of B. b. vulpinus). In comparison, the mountain buzzard, which is more similar in size to the steppe buzzard and slightly larger than the forest buzzard, is usually duller brown above than a steppe buzzard and is more whitish below with distinctive heavy brown blotches from breasts to the belly, flanks and wing linings while juvenile mountain buzzard is buffy below with smaller and streakier markings. The steppe buzzard when compared to another African species, the red-necked buzzard (Buteo auguralis), which has red tail similar to B. b. vulpinus, is distinct in all other plumage aspects despite their similar size. The latter buzzard has a streaky rufous head and is white below with a contrasting bold dark chest in adult plumage and, in juvenile plumage, has heavy, dark blotches on the chest and flanks with pale wing-linings. Jackal and augur buzzards (Buteo rufofuscus and B. augur), also both rufous on the tail, are larger and bulkier than steppe buzzards and have several distinctive plumage characteristics, most notably both having their own striking, contrasting patterns of black-brown, rufous and cream.

== Distribution and habitat ==
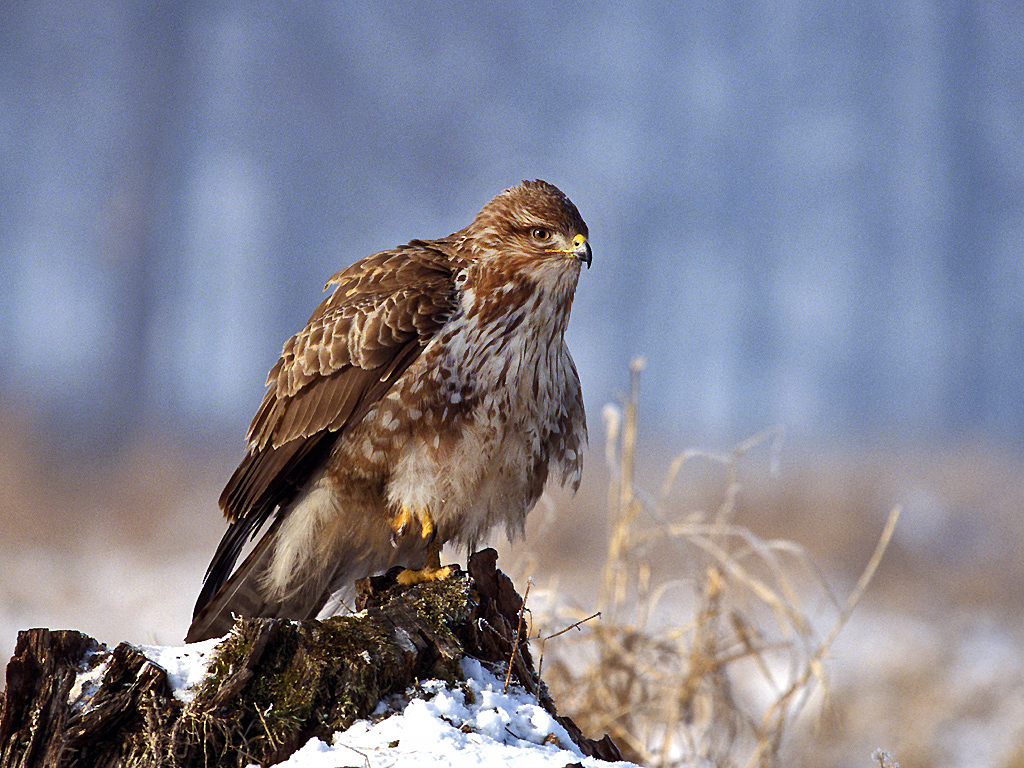
Common buzzard often inhabit the interface of woods and open areas.

The common buzzard is found throughout several islands in the eastern Atlantic islands, including the Canary Islands and Azores and almost throughout Europe. It is today found in Ireland and in nearly every part of Scotland, Wales and England. In mainland Europe, remarkably, there are no substantial gaps without breeding common buzzards from Portugal and Spain to Greece, Estonia, Belarus and Ukraine, though are present mainly only in the breeding season in much of the eastern half of the latter three countries. They are also present in all larger Mediterranean islands such as Corsica, Sardinia, Sicily and Crete. Further north in Scandinavia, they are found mainly in southeastern Norway (though also some points in southwestern Norway close to the coast and one section north of Trondheim), just over the southern half of Sweden and hugging over the Gulf of Bothnia to Finland where they live as a breeding species over nearly two-thirds of the land.

The common buzzard reaches its northern limits as a breeder in far eastern Finland and over the border to European Russia, continuing as a breeder over to the narrowest straits of the White Sea and nearly to the Kola Peninsula. In these northern quarters, the common buzzard is present typically only in summer but is a year-around resident of a hearty bit of southern Sweden and some of southern Norway. Outside of Europe, it is a resident of northern Turkey (largely close to the Black Sea) otherwise occurring mainly as a passage migrant or winter visitor in the remainder of Turkey, Georgia, sporadically but not rarely in Azerbaijan and Armenia, northern Iran (largely hugging the Caspian Sea) to northern Turkmenistan. Further north though its absent from either side of the northern Caspian Sea, the common buzzard is found in much of western Russia (though exclusively as a breeder) including all of the Central Federal District and the Volga Federal District, all but the northernmost parts of the Northwestern and Ural Federal Districts and nearly the southern half of the Siberian Federal District, its farthest easterly occurrence as a breeder. It also found in northern Kazakhstan, Kyrgyzstan, far northwestern China (Tien Shan) and northwestern Mongolia.

Non-breeding populations occur, either as migrants or wintering birds, in southwestern India, Israel, Lebanon, Syria, Egypt (northeastern), northern Tunisia (and far northwestern Algeria), northern Morocco, near the coasts of The Gambia, Senegal and far southwestern Mauritania and Ivory Coast (and bordering Burkina Faso). In eastern and central Africa, it is found in winter from southeastern Sudan, Eritrea, about two-thirds of Ethiopia, much of Kenya (though apparently absent from the northeast and northwest), Uganda, southern and eastern Democratic Republic of the Congo, and more or less the entirety of southern Africa from Angola across to Tanzania down the remainder of the continent (but for an apparent gap along the coast from southwestern Angola to northwestern South Africa).

=== Habitat ===
The common buzzard generally inhabits the interface of woodlands and open grounds; most typically the species lives in forest edge, small woods or shelterbelts with adjacent grassland, arables or other farmland. It acquits to open moorland as long as there is some trees for perch hunting and nesting use. The woods they inhabit may be coniferous, temperate broadleaf and mixed forests and temperate deciduous forest with occasional preferences for the local dominant tree. It is absent from treeless tundra, as well as the Subarctic where the species almost entirely gives way to the rough-legged buzzard. The common buzzard is sporadic or rare in treeless steppe but can occasionally migrate through it (despite its name, the steppe buzzard subspecies breeds primarily in the wooded fringes of the steppe). The species may be found to some extent in both in mountainous or flat country. Although adaptable to and sometimes seen in wetlands and in coastal areas, buzzards are often considered more of an upland species and neither appear to be regularly attracted to or to strongly avoid bodies of waters in non-migratory times. Buzzards in well-wooded areas of eastern Poland largely used large, mature stands of trees that were more humid, richer and denser than prevalent in surrounding area, but showed preference for those within 30 to 90 m (98 to 295 ft) of openings. Mostly resident buzzards live in lowlands and foothills, but they can live in timbered ridges and uplands as well as rocky coasts, sometimes nesting on cliff ledges rather than trees. Buzzards may live from sea level to elevations of 2,000 m (6,600 ft), breeding mostly below 1,000 m (3,300 ft) but they can winter to an elevation of 2,500 m (8,200 ft) and migrates easily to 4,500 m (14,800 ft). In the mountainous Italian Apennines, buzzard nests were at a mean elevation of 1,399 m (4,590 ft) and were, relative to the surrounding area, further from human developed areas (i.e. roads) and nearer to valley bottoms in rugged, irregularly topographed places, especially ones that faced northeast.

Common buzzards are fairly adaptable to agricultural lands but can show regional declines in apparent response to agriculture. Changes to more extensive agricultural practices were shown to reduce buzzard populations in western France where reduction of "hedgerows, woodlots and grasslands areas" caused a decline of buzzards and in Hampshire, England where more extensive grazing by free-range cattle and horses led to declines of buzzards, probably largely due to the seeming reduction of small mammal populations there. On the contrary, buzzards in central Poland adapted to removal of pine trees and reduction of rodent prey by changing nest sites and prey for a time with no strong change in their local numbers. Extensive urbanisation seems to negatively affect buzzards, this species being generally less adaptable to urban areas than its New World counterpart the red-tailed hawk. Although peri-urban areas can actually increase potential prey populations in a location at times, individual buzzard mortality, nest disturbances and nest site habitat degradation rises significantly in such areas. Common buzzards are fairly adaptive to rural areas as well as suburban areas with parks and large gardens, in addition to such areas if they're near farms.

== Behaviour ==
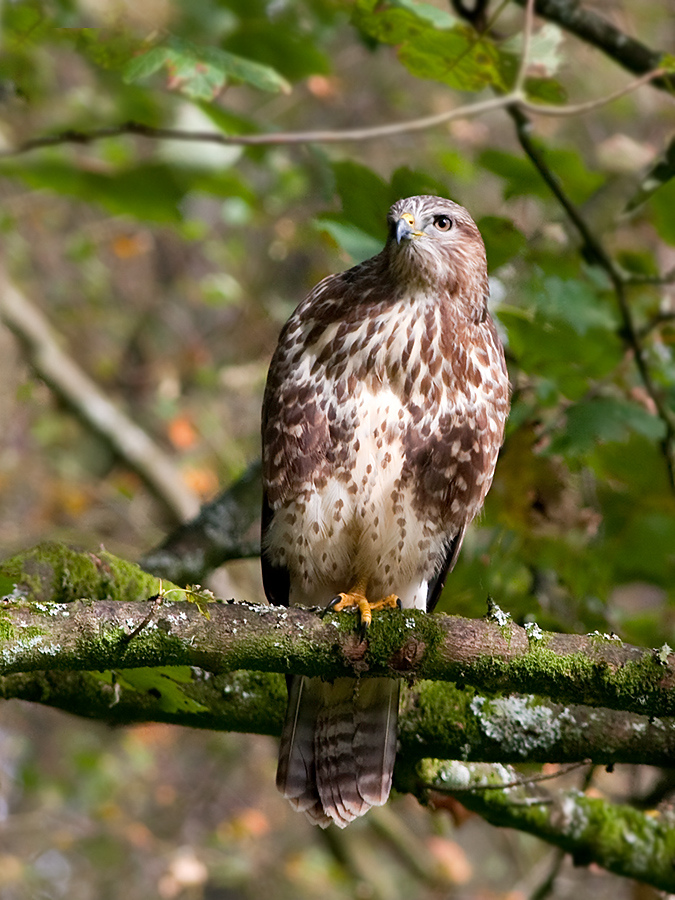
Buzzards spend much of their day perched.

The common buzzard is a typical Buteo in much of its behaviour. It is most often seen either soaring at varying heights or perched prominently on tree tops, bare branches, telegraph poles, fence posts, rocks or ledges, or alternately well inside tree canopies. Buzzards will also stand and forage on the ground. In resident populations, it may spend more than half of its day inactively perched. Furthermore, it has been described as a "sluggish and not very bold" bird of prey. It is a gifted soarer once aloft and can do so for extended periods but can appear laborious and heavy in level flight, more so nominate buzzards than steppe buzzards. Particularly in migration, as was recorded in the case of steppe buzzards' movement over Israel, buzzards readily adjust their direction, tail and wing placement and flying height to adjust for the surrounding environment and wind conditions. In Israel, migrant buzzards rarely soar all that high (maximum 1,000–2,000 m (3,300–6,600 ft) above ground) due to the lack of mountain ridges that in other areas typically produce flyways; however tail-winds are significant and allow birds to cover a mean of 9.8 m/s (35 km/h; 22 mph; 32 ft/s).

=== Migration ===
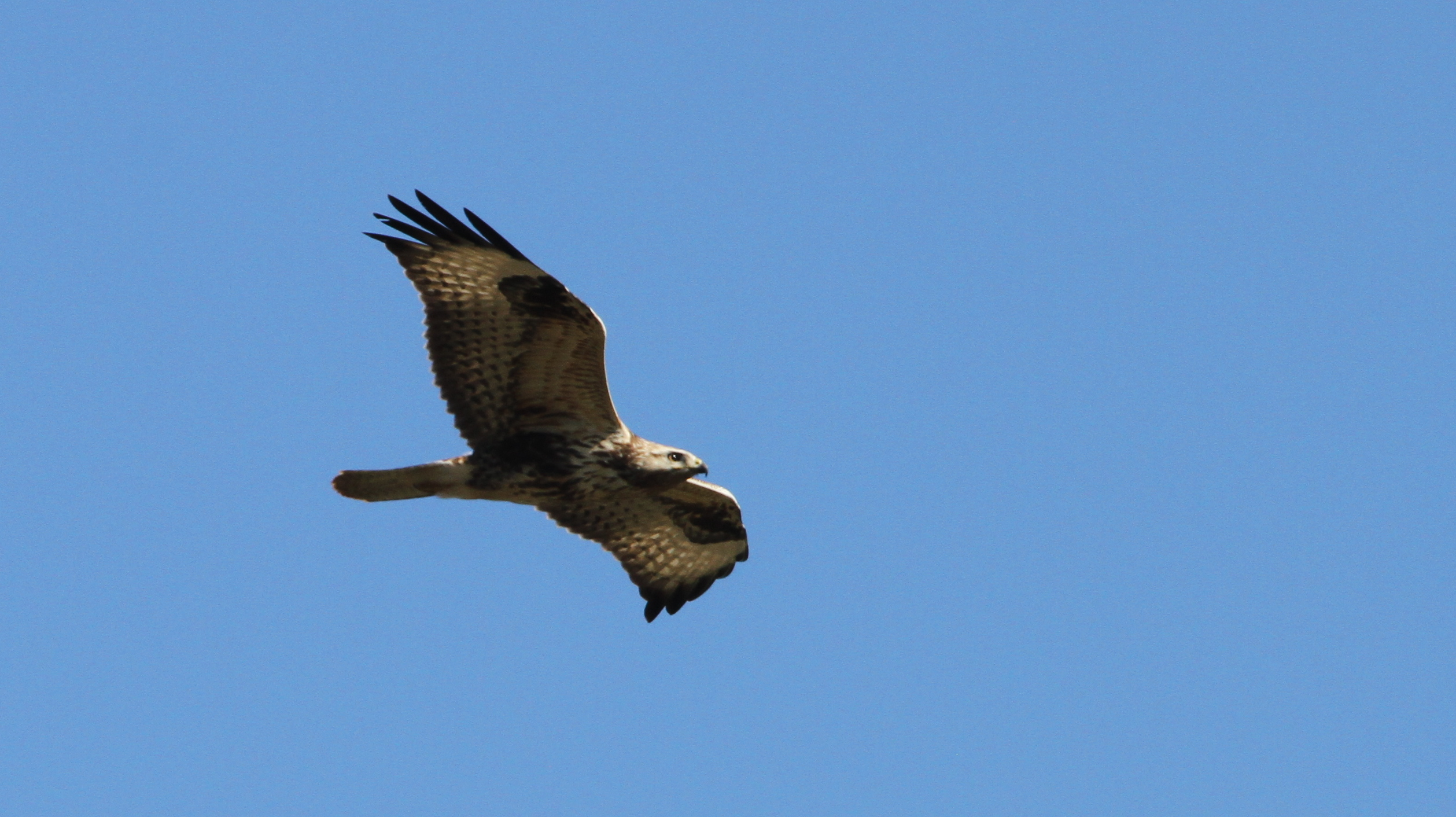
A steppe buzzard migrating through Israel, where buzzards have one of the largest raptor migrations in the world

The common buzzard is aptly described as a partial migrant. The autumn and spring movements of buzzards are subject to extensive variation, even down to the individual level, based on a region's food resources, competition (both from other buzzards and other predators), extent of human disturbance and weather conditions. Short-distance movements are the norm for juveniles and some adults in autumn and winter, but more adults in central Europe and the British Isles remain on their year-around residence than do not. Even for first year juvenile buzzards dispersal may not take them very far. In England, 96% of first-years moved in winter to less than 100 km (62 mi) from their natal site. Southwestern Poland was recorded to be a fairly important wintering grounds for central European buzzards in early spring that apparently travelled from somewhat farther north, in winter average density was a locally high 2.12 individual per square kilometer. Habitat and prey availability seemed to be the primary drivers of habitat selection in fall for European buzzards. In northern Germany, buzzards were recorded to show preferences in fall for areas fairly distant from nesting site, with a large quantity of vole-holes and more widely dispersed perches. In Bulgaria, the mean wintering density was 0.34 individual per square kilometer, and buzzards showed a preference for agricultural over forested areas. Similar habitat preferences were recorded in northeastern Romania, where buzzard density was 0.334–0.539 individuals per square kilometer. The nominate buzzards of Scandinavia are somewhat more strongly migratory than most central European populations. However, birds from Sweden show some variation in migratory behaviours. A maximum of 41,000 individuals have been recorded at one of the main migration sites within southern Sweden in Falsterbo. In southern Sweden, winter movements and migration was studied via observation of buzzard colour. White individuals were substantially more common in southern Sweden rather than further north in their Swedish range. The southern population migrates earlier than intermediate to dark buzzards, in both adults and juveniles. A larger proportion of juveniles than of adults migrate in the southern population. Especially adults in the southern population are resident to a higher degree than more northerly breeders.

The entire population of the steppe buzzard is strongly migratory, covering substantial distances during migration. In no part of the range do steppe buzzards use the same summering and wintering grounds. Steppe buzzards are slightly gregarious in migration, and travel in variously sized flocks. This subspecies migrates in September to October often from Asia Minor to the Cape of Africa in about a month but does not cross water, following around the Winam Gulf of Lake Victoria rather than crossing the several kilometer wide gulf. Similarly, they will funnel along both sides of the Black Sea. Migratory behaviour of steppe buzzards mirrors those of broad-winged & Swainson's hawks (Buteo platypterus and B. swainsoni) in every significant way as similar long-distance migrating Buteo species, including trans-equatorial movements, avoidance of large bodies of waters and flocking behaviour. Migrating steppe buzzards will rise up with the morning thermals and can cover an average of hundreds of miles a day using the available currents along mountain ridges and other topographic features. The spring migration for steppe buzzards peaks around March–April, but the latest B. b. vulpinus arrive in their breeding grounds by late April or early May. Distances covered by migrating steppe buzzards in one way flights from northern Europe (i.e. Finland or Sweden) to southern Africa have ranged over 13,000 km (8,100 mi) within a season .

For the steppe buzzards from eastern and northern Europe and western Russia (which compromise a majority of all steppe buzzards), peak migratory numbers occur in differing areas in autumn, when the largest recorded movements occurs through Asia Minor such as Turkey, than in spring, when the largest recorded movement are to the south in the Middle East, especially Israel. The two migratory movements barely differ overall until they reach the Middle East and east Africa, where the largest volume of migrants in autumn occurs at the southern part of the Red Sea, around Djibouti and Yemen, while the main volume in spring is in the northernmost strait, around Egypt and Israel. In autumn, numbers of steppe buzzards recorded in migration have ranged up to 32,000 (recorded 1971) in northwestern Turkey (Bosporus) and in northeastern Turkey (Black Sea) up to 205,000 (recorded 1976). Further down in migration, autumn numbers of up to 98,000 have been recorded in passage in Djibouti. Between 150,000 and nearly 466,000 Steppe Buzzard have been recorded migrating through Israel during spring, making this not only the most abundant migratory raptor here but one of the largest raptor migrations anywhere in the world. Migratory movements of southern Africa buzzards largely occur along the major mountain ranges, such as the Drakensberg and Lebombo Mountains. Wintering steppe buzzards occur far more irregularly in Transvaal than Cape region in winter. The onset of migratory movement for steppe buzzards back to the breeding grounds in southern Africa is mainly in March, peaking in the second week. Steppe buzzard molt their feathers rapidly upon arrival at wintering grounds and seems to split their flight feather molt between breeding ground in Eurasia and wintering ground in southern Africa, the molt pausing during migration. In last 50 years, it was recorded that nominate buzzards are typically migrating shorter distances and wintering further north, possibly in response to climate change, resulting in relatively smaller numbers of them at migration sites. They are also extending their breeding range possibly reducing/supplanting steppe buzzards.

=== Vocal behaviour ===
Resident populations of common buzzards tend to call all year around, whereas migrants tend to call only during the breeding season. Both nominate buzzards and steppe buzzards (and their numerous related subspecies within their types) tend to have similar voices. The main call of the species is a plaintive, far-carrying pee-yow or peee-oo, used as both contact call and more excitedly in aerial displays. Their call is sharper, more ringing when used in aggression, tends to be more drawn-out and wavering when chasing intruders, sharper, more yelping when as warning when approaching the nest or shorter and more explosive when called in alarm. Other variations of their vocal performances include a cat-like mew, uttered repeatedly on the wing or when perched, especially in display; a repeated mah has been recorded as uttered by pairs answering each other, further chuckles and croaks have also been recorded at nests. Juveniles can usually be distinguished by the discordant nature of their calls compared to those of adults.

== Dietary biology ==
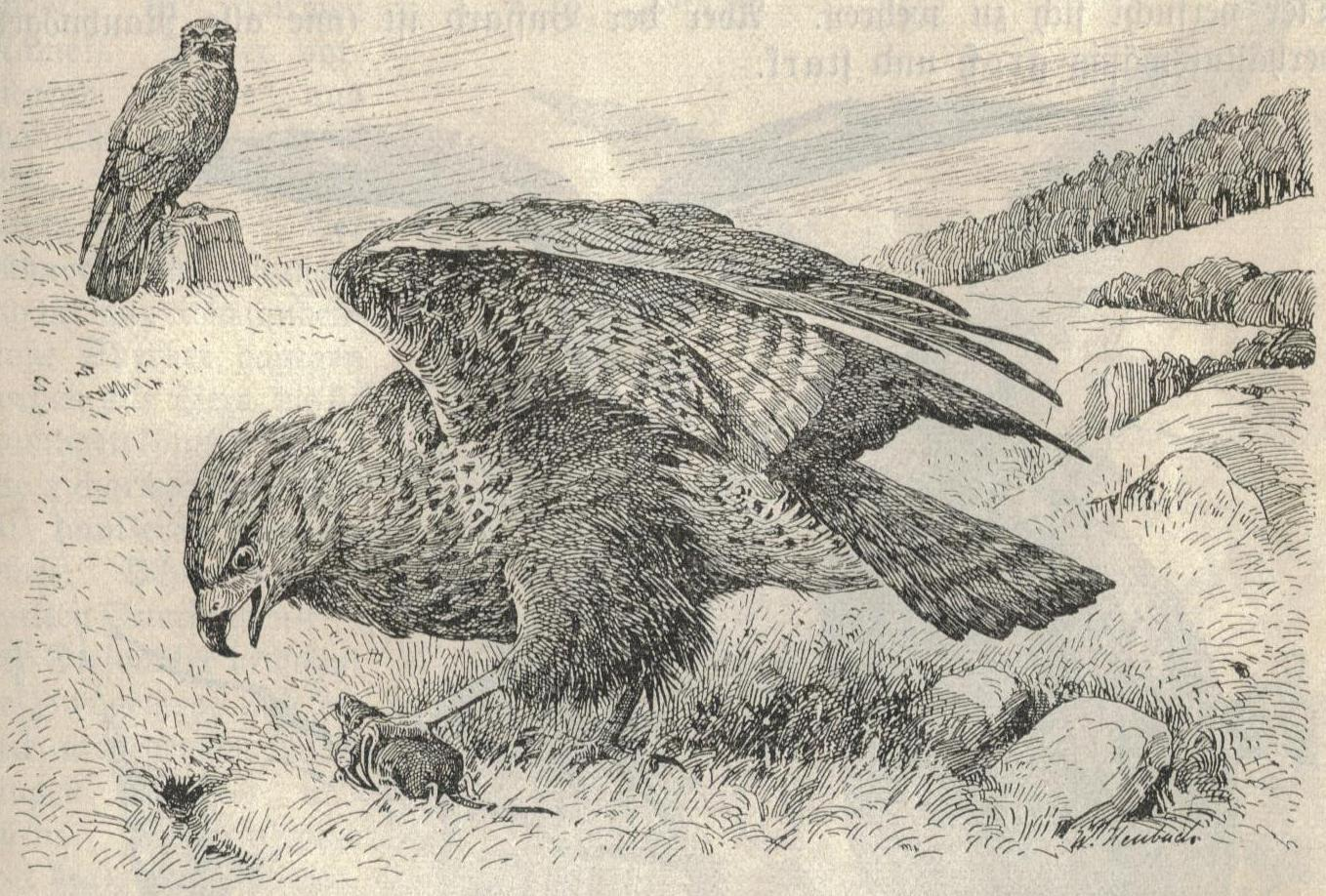
An illustration of a buzzard preying on a rodent

The common buzzard is a generalist predator which hunts a wide variety of prey given the opportunity. Their prey spectrum extents to a wide variety of vertebrates including mammals, birds (from any age from eggs to adult birds), reptiles, amphibians and, rarely, fish, as well as to various invertebrates, mostly insects. Young animals are often attacked, largely the nidifugous young of various vertebrates. In total well over 300 prey species are known to be taken by common buzzards. Furthermore, prey size can vary from tiny beetles, caterpillars and ants to large adult grouse and rabbits up to nearly twice their body mass. Mean body mass of vertebrate prey was estimated at 179.6 g (6.34 oz) in Belarus. At times, they will also subsist partially on carrion, usually of dead mammals or fish. However, dietary studies have shown that they mostly prey upon small mammals, largely small rodents. Like many temperate zone raptorial birds of varied lineages, voles are an essential part of the common buzzard's diet. This bird's preference for the interface between woods and open areas frequently puts them in ideal vole habitat. Hunting in relatively open areas has been found to increase hunting success whereas more complete shrub cover lowered success. A majority of prey is taken by dropping from perch, and is normally taken on ground. Alternately, prey may be hunted in a low flight. This species tends not to hunt in a spectacular stoop but generally drops gently then gradually accelerate at bottom with wings held above the back. Sometimes, the buzzard also forages by random glides or soars over open country, wood edges or clearings. Perch hunting may be done preferentially but buzzards fairly regularly also hunt from a ground position when the habitat demands it. Outside the breeding season, as many as 15–30 buzzards have been recorded foraging on ground in a single large field, especially juveniles. Normally the rarest foraging type is hovering. A study from Great Britain indicated that hovering does not seem to increase hunting success.

=== Mammals ===
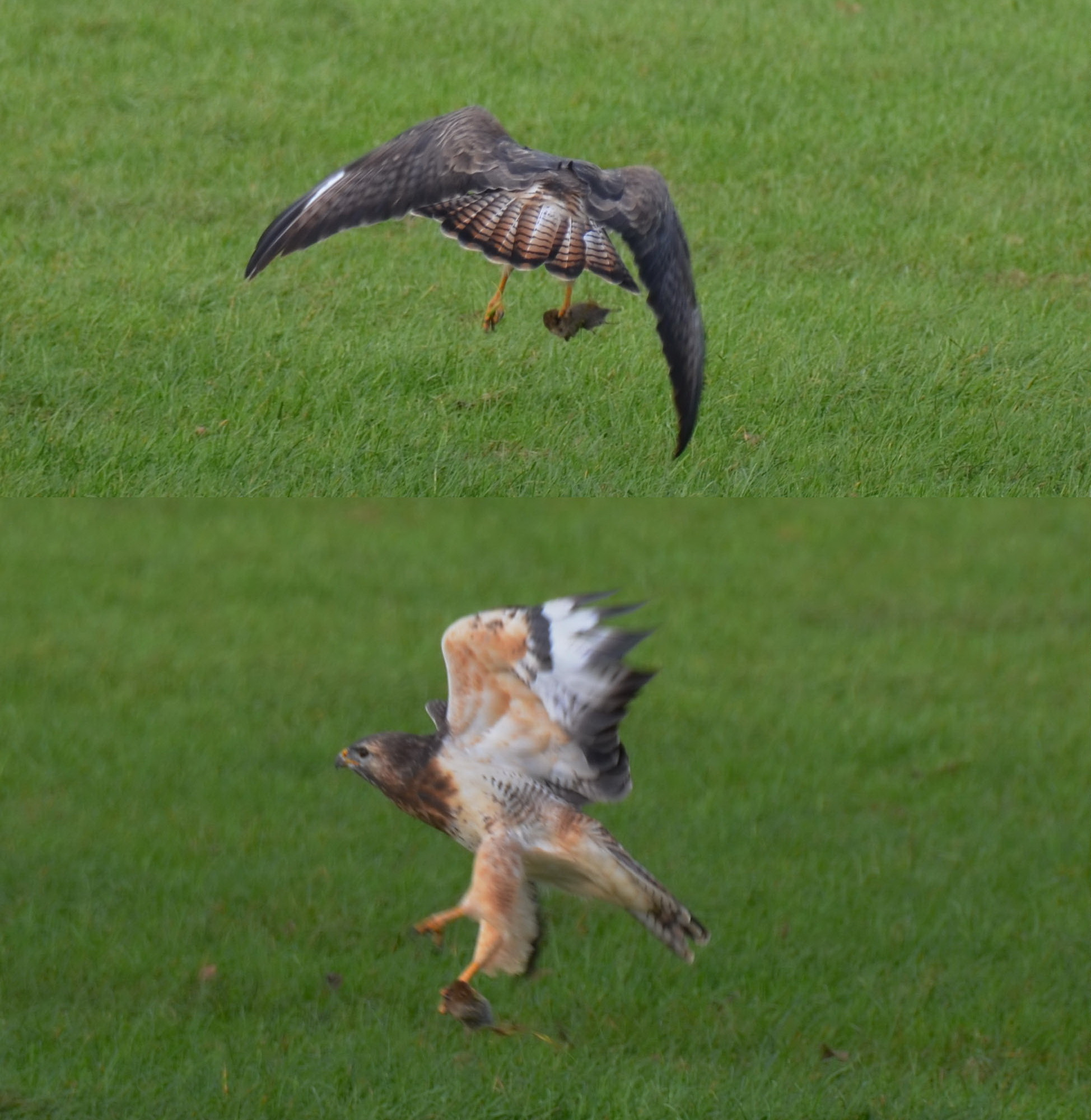
A buzzard with a freshly caught rodent, likely a vole

A high diversity of rodents may be taken given the chance, as around 60 species of rodent have been recorded in the foods of common buzzards. It seems clear that voles are the most significant prey type for European buzzards. Nearly every study from the continent makes reference to the importance, in particular, of the two most numerous and widely distributed European voles: the 28.5 g (1.01 oz) common vole (Microtus arvalis) and the somewhat more northerly ranging 40 g (1.4 oz) field vole (Microtus agrestis). In southern Scotland, field voles were the best-represented species in pellets, accounting for 32.1% of 581 pellets. In southern Norway, field voles were again the main food in years with peak vole numbers, accounting for 40.8% of 179 prey items in 1985 and 24.7% of 332 prey items in 1994. Altogether, rodents amount to 67.6% and 58.4% of the foods in these respective peak vole years. However, in low vole population years, the contribution of rodents to the diet was minor. As far west as the Netherlands, common voles were the most regular prey, amounting to 19.6% of 6624 prey items in a very large study. Common voles were the main foods recorded in central Slovakia, accounting for 26.5% of 606 prey items. The common vole, or other related vole species at times, were the main foods as well in Ukraine (17.2% of 146 prey items) ranging east to Russia in the Privolshky Steppe Nature Reserve (41.8% of 74 prey items) and in Samara (21.4% of 183 prey items). Other records from Russia and Ukraine show voles ranging from slightly secondary prey to as much as 42.2% of the diet. In Belarus, voles, including Microtus species and 18.4 g (0.65 oz) bank voles (Myodes glareolus), accounted for 34.8% of the biomass on average in 1065 prey items from different study areas over 4 years. At least 12 species of the genus Microtus are known to be hunted by common buzzards and even this is probably conservative, moreover similar species like lemmings will be taken if available.

Other rodents are taken largely opportunistically rather than by preference. Several wood mice (Apodemus ssp.) are known to be taken quite frequently but given their preference for activity in deeper woods than the field-forest interfaces preferred, they are rarely more than secondary food items. An exception was in Samara where the yellow-necked mouse (Apodemus flavicollis), one of the largest of its genus at 28.4 g (1.00 oz), made up 20.9%, putting it just behind the common vole in importance. Similarly, tree squirrels are readily taken but rarely important in the foods of buzzards in Europe, as buzzards apparently prefer to avoid taking prey from trees nor do they possess the agility typically necessary to capture significant quantities of tree squirrels. All four ground squirrels that range (mostly) into eastern Europe are also known to be common buzzard prey but little quantitative analysis has gone into how significant such predator-prey relations are. Rodent prey taken have ranged in size from the 7.8 g (0.28 oz) Eurasian harvest mouse (Micromys minutus) to the non-native, 1,100 g (2.4 lb) muskrat (Ondatra zibethicus). Other rodents taken either seldom or in areas where the food habits of buzzards are spottily known include flying squirrels, marmots (presumably very young if taken alive), chipmunks, spiny rats, hamsters, mole-rats, gerbils, jirds and jerboas and occasionally hearty numbers of dormice, although these are nocturnal. Surprisingly little research has gone into the diets of wintering steppe buzzards in southern Africa, considering their numerous status there. However, it has been indicated that the main prey remains consist of rodents such as the four-striped grass mouse (Rhabdomys pumilio) and Cape mole-rats (Georychus capensis).

Other than rodents, two other groups of mammals can be counted as significant to the diet of common buzzards. One of these main prey types of import in the diets of common buzzards are leporids or lagomorphs, especially the European rabbit (Oryctolagus cuniculus) where it is found in numbers in a wild or feral state. In all dietary studies from Scotland, rabbits were highly important to the buzzard's diet. In southern Scotland, rabbits constituted 40.8% of remains at nests and 21.6% of pellet contents, while lagomorphs (mainly rabbits but also some young hares) were present in 99% of remains in Moray, Scotland. The nutritional richness relative to the commonest prey elsewhere, such as voles, might account for the high productivity of buzzards here. For example, clutch sizes were twice as large on average where rabbits were common (Moray) than were where they were rare (Glen Urquhart). In northern Ireland, an area of interest because it is devoid of any native vole species, rabbits were again the main prey. Here, lagomorphs constituted 22.5% of prey items by number and 43.7% by biomass. While rabbits are non-native, albeit long-established, in the British Isles, in their native area of the Iberian peninsula, rabbits are similarly significant to the buzzard's diet. In Murcia, Spain, rabbits were the most common mammal in the diet, making up 16.8% of 167 prey items. In a large study from northeastern Spain, rabbits were dominant in the buzzard's foods, making up 66.5% of 598 prey items. In the Netherlands, European rabbits were second in number (19.1% of 6624 prey items) only to common voles and the largest contributor of biomass to nests (36.7%). Outside of these (at least historically) rabbit-rich areas, leverets of the common hare species found in Europe can be important supplemental prey. European hare (Lepus europaeus) were the fourth most important prey species in central Poland and the third most significant prey species in Stavropol Krai, Russia. Buzzards normally attack the young of European rabbits and hares. Most of the rabbits taken by buzzard variously been estimated from 159 to 550 g (5.6 to 19.4 oz), and infrequently up to 700 g (1.5 lb) in weight. Similarly, in different areas and the mean weight of brown hares taken in Finland was around 500 g (1.1 lb). One young mountain hare (Lepus timidus) taken in Norway was estimated to about 1,000 g (2.2 lb). However, common buzzards are known to kill adult rabbits at times. This can be supported by remains of relatively large-sized tarsus bones of the rabbit, up to 64mm in length.

The other significant mammalian prey type is insectivores, among which more than 20 species are known to be taken by this species, including nearly all the species of shrew, mole and hedgehog found in Europe. Moles are taken particularly often among this order, since as is the case with "vole-holes", buzzards probably tend to watch molehills in fields for activity and dive quickly from their perch when one of the subterranean mammals pops up. The most widely found mole in the buzzard's northern range is the 98 g (3.5 oz) European mole (Talpa europaea) and this is one of the more important non-rodent prey items for the species. This species was present in 55% of 101 remains in Glen Urquhart, Scotland and was the second most common prey species (18.6%) in 606 prey items in Slovakia. In Bari, Italy, the Roman mole (Talpa romana), of similar size to the European species, was the leading identified mammalian prey, making up 10.7% of the diet. The full-size range of insectivores may be taken by buzzards, ranging from the world's smallest mammal (by weight), the 1.8 g (0.063 oz) Etruscan shrew (Suncus etruscus) to arguably the heaviest insectivore, the 800 g (28 oz) European hedgehog (Erinaceus europaeus). Mammalian prey for common buzzards other than rodents, insectivores, and lagomorphs is rarely taken. Occasionally, some weasels such as least weasel (Mustela nivalis) and stoat (Mustela erminea) are taken, and remains of young pine martens (Martes martes) and adult european polecats (Mustela putorius) was found in buzzard nest. Numerous larger mammals, including medium-sized carnivores such as dogs, cats and foxes and various ungulates, are sometimes eaten as carrion by buzzards, mainly during lean winter months. Still-borns of deer are also visited with some frequency.

=== Birds ===
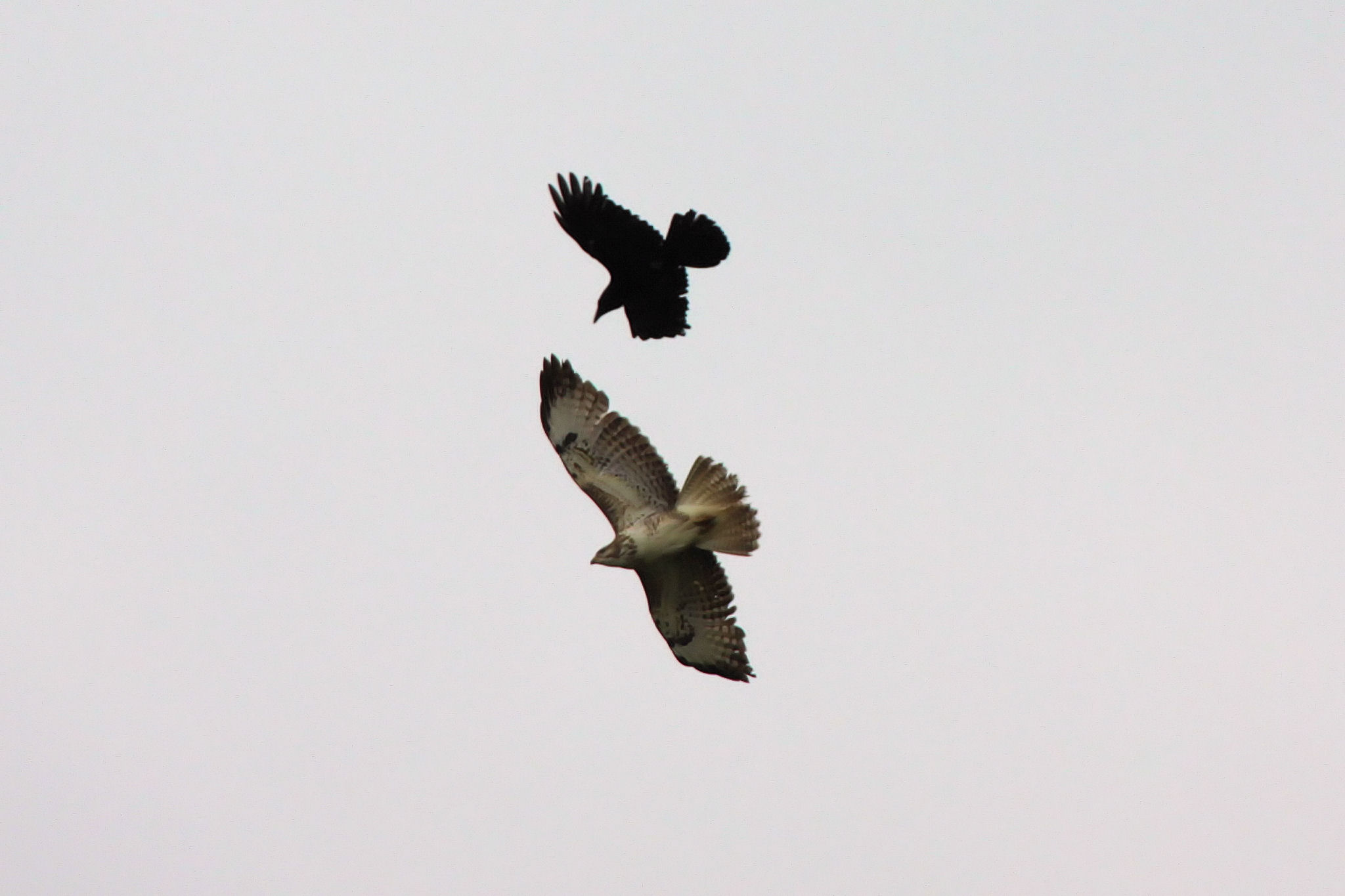
A crow mobs a buzzard. Buzzards will readily prey on crows, especially their fledglings.

When attacking birds, common buzzards chiefly prey on nestlings and fledglings of small to medium-sized birds, largely passerines but also a variety of gamebirds, but sometimes also injured, sickly or unwary but healthy adults. While capable of overpowering birds larger than itself, the common buzzard is usually considered to lack the agility necessary to capture many adult birds, even gamebirds which would presumably be weaker fliers considering their relatively heavy bodies and small wings. The amount of fledgling and younger birds preyed upon relative to adults is variable, however. For example, in the Italian Alps, 72% of birds taken were fledglings or recently fledged juveniles, 19% were nestlings and 8% were adults. On the contrary, in southern Scotland, even though the buzzards were taking relatively large bird prey, largely red grouse (Lagopus scotica), 87% of birds taken were reportedly adults. In total, as in many raptorial birds that are far from bird-hunting specialists, birds are the most diverse group in the buzzard's prey spectrum due to the sheer number and diversity of birds, few raptors do not hunt them at least occasionally. Nearly 150 species of bird have been identified in the common buzzard's diet. In general, despite many that are taken, birds usually take a secondary position in the diet after mammals. In northern Scotland, birds were fairly numerous in the foods of buzzards. The most often recorded avian prey and 2nd and 3rd most frequent prey species (after only field voles) in Glen Urquhart, were 23.9 g (0.84 oz) chaffinch (Fringilla coelebs) and 18.4 g (0.65 oz) meadow pipits (Anthus pratensis), with the buzzards taking 195 fledglings of these species against only 90 adults. This differed from Moray where the most frequent avian prey and 2nd most frequent prey species behind the rabbit was the 480 g (17 oz) common wood pigeon (Columba palumbus), and the buzzards took four times as many adults relative to fledglings.

Birds were the primary food for common buzzards in the Italian Alps, where they made up 46% of the diet against mammal which accounted for 29% in 146 prey items. The leading prey species here were 103 g (3.6 oz) Eurasian blackbirds (Turdus merula) and 160 g (5.6 oz) Eurasian jays (Garrulus glandarius), albeit largely fledglings were taken of both. Birds could also take the leading position in years with low vole populations in southern Norway, in particular thrushes, including the blackbird, the 67.7 g (2.39 oz) song thrush (Turdus philomelos) and the 61 g (2.2 oz) redwing (Turdus iliacus), which were collectively 22.1% of 244 prey items in 1993. In southern Spain, birds were equal in number to mammals in the diet, both at 38.3%, but most remains were classified as "unidentified medium-sized birds", although the most often identified species of those that apparently could be determined were Eurasian jays and red-legged partridges (Alectoris rufa). Similarly, in northern Ireland, birds were roughly equal in import to mammals but most were unidentified corvids. In Seversky Donets, Ukraine, birds and mammals both made up 39.3% of the foods of buzzards. Common buzzards may hunt nearly 80 species passerines and nearly all available gamebirds. Like many other largish raptors, gamebirds are attractive to hunt for buzzards due to their ground-dwelling habits. Buzzards were the most frequent predator in a study of juvenile pheasants in England, accounting for 4.3% of 725 deaths (against 3.2% by foxes, 0.7% by owls and 0.5% by other mammals). They also prey on a wide size range of birds, ranging down to Europe's smallest bird, the 5.2 g (0.18 oz) goldcrest (Regulus regulus). Very few individual birds hunted by buzzards weigh more than 500 g (1.1 lb). However, there have been some particularly large avian kills by buzzards, including many that weigh more than or around 1,000 g (2.2 lb), or about the largest average size of a buzzard; including adults of mallard (Anas platyrhynchos), black grouse (Tetrao tetrix), common pheasant (Phasianus colchicus), common raven (Corvus corax) and some of the larger gulls if ambushed on their nests. The largest avian kill by a buzzard, and possibly largest known overall for the species, was an adult female western capercaillie (Tetrao urogallus) that weighed an estimated 1,985 g (4.376 lb). At times, buzzards will hunt the young of large birds such as herons and cranes. Other assorted avian prey has included a few species of waterfowl, most available pigeons and doves, cuckoos, swifts, grebes, rails, nearly 20 assorted shorebirds, tubenoses, hoopoes, bee-eaters and several types of woodpecker. Birds with more conspicuous or open nesting areas or habits are more likely to have fledglings or nestlings attacked, such as water birds, while those with more secluded or inaccessible nests, such as pigeons/doves and woodpeckers, adults are more likely to be hunted.

=== Reptiles and amphibians ===
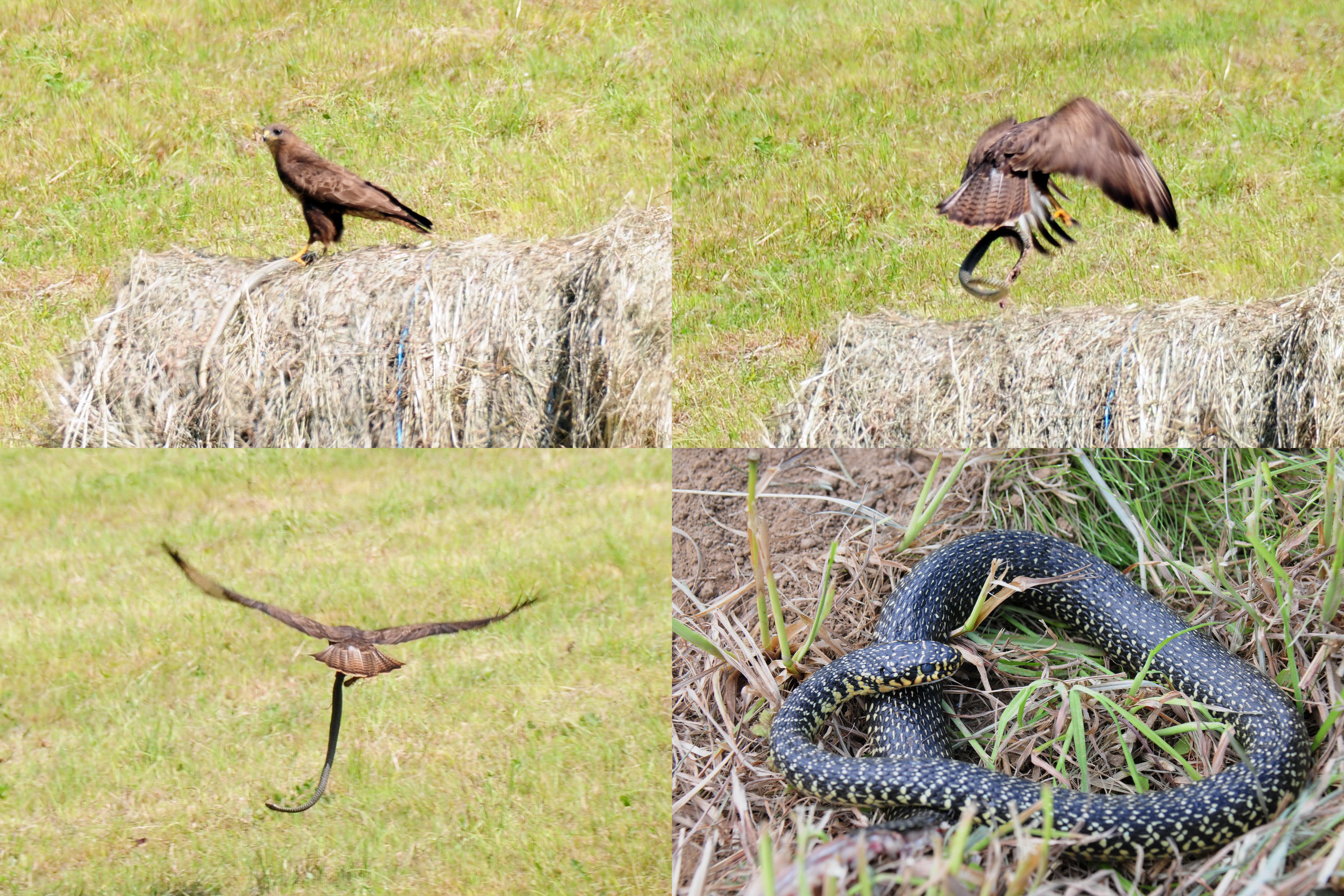
A buzzard that caught a large green whip snake but was flushed from its catch

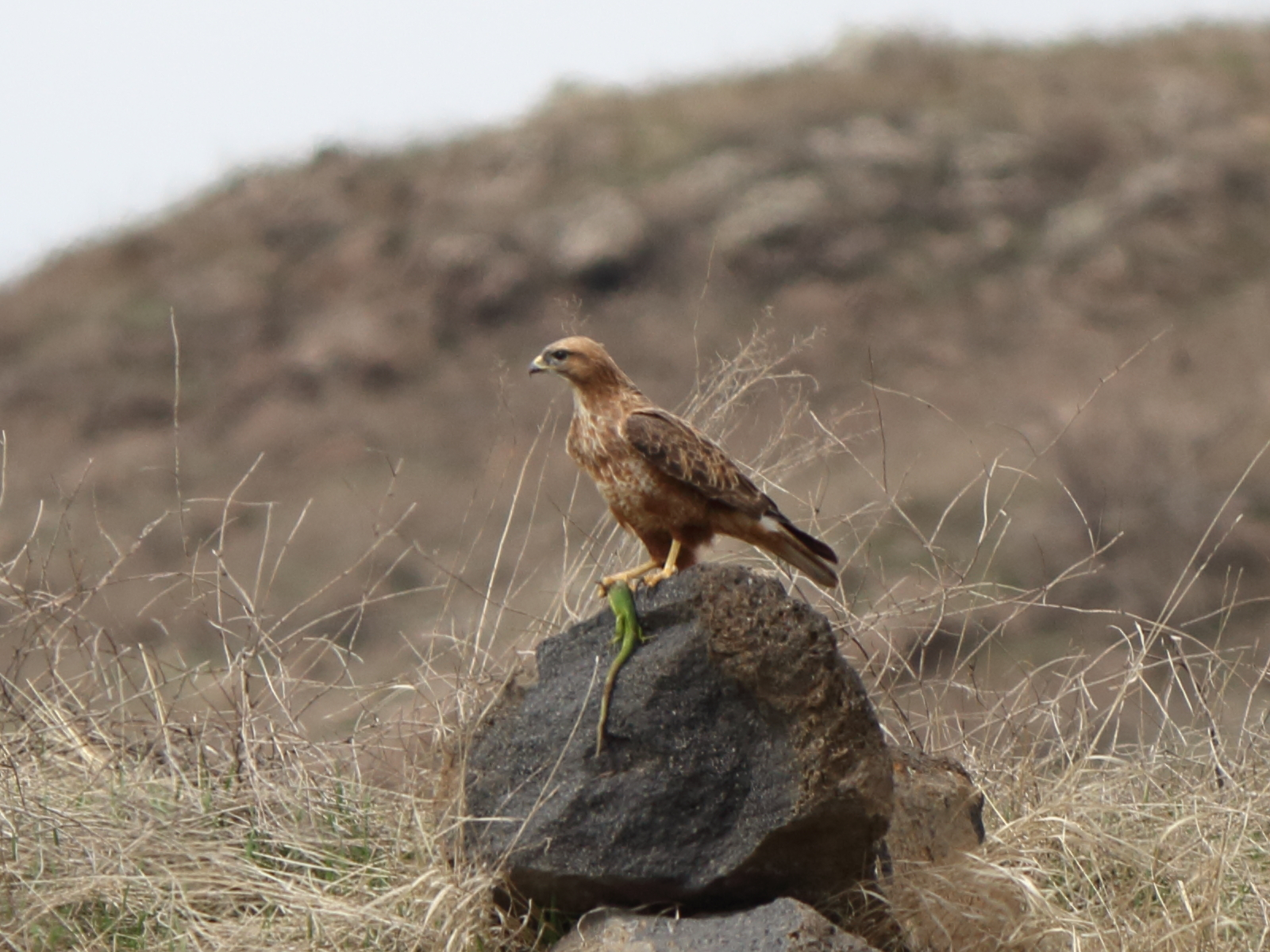
A steppe buzzard (B. b. vulpinus) with a medium lizard prey in Armenia

The common buzzard may be the most regular avian predator of reptiles and amphibians in Europe apart from the sections where they are sympatric with the largely snake-eating short-toed eagle. In total, the prey spectrum of common buzzards include nearly 50 herpetological prey species. In studies from northern and southern Spain, the leading prey numerically were both reptilian, although in Biscay (northern Spain) the leading prey (19%) was classified as "unidentified snakes". In Murcia, the most numerous prey was the 77.2 g (2.72 oz) ocellated lizard (Timon lepidus), at 32.9%. In total, at Biscay and Murcia, reptiles accounted for 30.4% and 35.9% of the prey items, respectively. Findings were similar in a separate study from northeastern Spain, where reptiles amounted to 35.9% of prey. In Bari, Italy, reptiles were the main prey, making up almost exactly half of the biomass, led by the large green whip snake (Hierophis viridiflavus), at 24.2% of food mass. In Stavropol Krai, Russia, the 20 g (0.71 oz) sand lizard (Lacerta agilis) was the main prey at 23.7% of 55 prey items. The 16 g (0.56 oz) slowworm (Anguis fragilis), a legless lizard, became the most numerous prey for the buzzards of southern Norway in low vole years, amounting to 21.3% of 244 prey items in 1993 and were also common even in the peak vole year of 1994 (19% of 332 prey items).

Most snakes in Europe are potential prey and the buzzard has been known to be uncharacteristically bold in going after and overpowering large snakes such as rat snakes, ranging up to nearly 1.5 m (4 ft 11 in) in length, and healthy, large vipers despite the danger of being struck by such prey. However, in at least one case, the corpse of a female buzzard was found envenomed over the body of an adder that it had killed. In some parts of range, the common buzzard acquires the habit of taking many frogs and toads. This was the case in the Mogilev Region of Belarus where the 23 g (0.81 oz) moor frog (Rana arvalis) was the major prey (28.5%) over several years, followed by other frogs and toads amounting to 39.4% of the diet over the years. In central Scotland, the 46 g (1.6 oz) common toad (Bufo bufo) was the most numerous prey species, accounting for 21.7% of 263 prey items, while the common frog (Rana temporaria) made up a further 14.7% of the diet. Frogs also made up about 10% of the diet in central Poland.

=== Invertebrates and other prey ===
When common buzzards feed on invertebrates, these are chiefly earthworms, beetles and caterpillars in Europe and largely seemed to be preyed on by juvenile buzzards with less refined hunting skills or in areas with mild winters and ample swarming or social insects. In most dietary studies, invertebrates are at best a minor supplemental contributor to the buzzard's diet. Nonetheless, roughly a dozen beetle species have found in the foods of buzzards from Ukraine alone. In winter in northeastern Spain, it was found that the buzzards switched largely from the vertebrate prey typically taken during spring and summer to a largely insect-based diet. Most of this prey was unidentified but the most frequently identified were European mantis (Mantis religiosa) and European mole cricket (Gryllotalpa gryllotalpa). In Ukraine, 30.8% of the food by number was found to be insects. Especially in winter quarters such as southern Africa, common buzzards are often attracted to swarming locusts and other orthopterans. In this way the steppe buzzard may mirror a similar long-distance migrant from the Americas, the Swainson's hawk, which feeds its young largely on nutritious vertebrates but switches to a largely insect-based once the reach their distant wintering grounds in South America. In Eritrea, 18 returning migrant steppe buzzards were seen to feed together on swarms of grasshoppers. For wintering steppe buzzards in Zimbabwe, one source went so far as to refer to them as primarily insectivorous, apparently being somewhat locally specialised to feeding on termites. Stomach contents in buzzards from Malawi apparently consisted largely of grasshoppers (alternately with lizards). Fish tend to be the rarest class of prey found in the common buzzard's foods. There are a couple cases of predation of fish detected in the Netherlands, while elsewhere they have been known to have fed upon eels and carp.

=== Interspecies predatory relationships ===
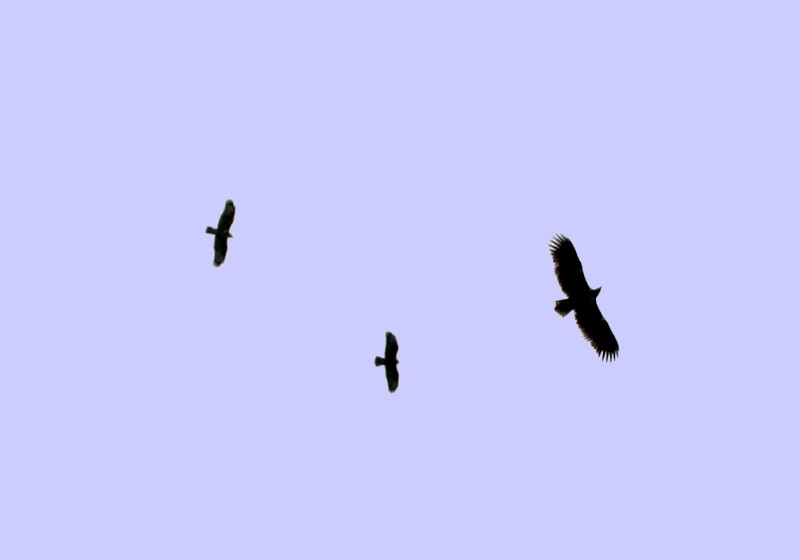
A juvenile white-tailed eagle being mobbed by a pair of common buzzards over the Isle of Canna, as the eagle will sometimes prey on the buzzard

Common buzzards co-occur with dozens of other raptorial birds through their breeding, resident and wintering grounds. There may be many other birds that broadly overlap in prey selection to some extent. Furthermore, their preference for interfaces of forest and field is used heavily by many birds of prey. Some of the most similar species by diet are the common kestrel (Falco tinniculus), hen harrier (Circus cyaenus) and lesser spotted eagle (Clanga clanga), not to mention nearly every European species of owl, as all but two may locally prefer rodents such as voles in their diets. Diet overlap was found to be extensive between buzzards and red foxes (Vulpes vulpes) in Poland, with 61.9% of prey selection overlapping by species although the dietary breadth of the fox was broader and more opportunistic. Both fox dens and buzzard roosts were found to be significantly closer to high vole areas relative to the overall environment here. The only other widely found European Buteo, the rough-legged buzzard, comes to winter extensively with common buzzards. It was found in southern Sweden, habitat, hunting and prey selection often overlapped considerably. Rough-legged buzzards appear to prefer slightly more open habitat and took slightly fewer wood mice than common buzzard. Roughlegs also hover much more frequently and are more given to hunting in high winds. The two buzzards are aggressive towards one another and excluded each other from winter feeding territories in similar ways to the way they exclude conspecifics. In northern Germany, the buffer of their habitat preferences apparently accounted for the lack of effect on each other's occupancy between the two buzzard species. Despite a broad range of overlap, very little is known about the ecology of common and long-legged buzzards where they co-exist. However, it can be inferred from the long-legged species preference for predation on differing prey, such as blind mole-rats, ground squirrels, hamsters and gerbils, from the voles usually preferred by the common species, that serious competition for food is unlikely.

A more direct negative effect has been found in buzzard's co-existence with northern goshawk (Accipiter gentilis). Despite the considerable discrepancy of the two species dietary habits, habitat selection in Europe is largely similar between buzzards and goshawks. Goshawks are slightly larger than buzzards and are more powerful, agile and generally more aggressive birds, and so they are considered dominant. In studies from Germany and Sweden, buzzards were found to be less disturbance sensitive than goshawks but were probably displaced into inferior nesting spots by the dominant goshawks. The exposure of buzzards to a dummy goshawk was found to decrease breeding success whereas there was no effect on breeding goshawks when they were exposed to a dummy buzzard. In many cases, in Germany and Sweden, goshawks displaced buzzards from their nests to take them over for themselves. In Poland, buzzards productivity was correlated to prey population variations, particularly voles which could vary from 10 to 80 per hectare, whereas goshawks were seemingly unaffected by prey variations; buzzards were found here to number 1.73 pair per 10 km^{2} (3.9 sq mi) against goshawk 1.63 pair per 10 km^{2} (3.9 sq mi). In contrast, the slightly larger counterpart of buzzards in North America, the red-tailed hawk (which is also slightly larger than American goshawks, the latter averaging smaller than European ones) are more similar in diet to goshawks there. Redtails are not invariably dominated by goshawks and are frequently able to outcompete them by virtue of greater dietary and habitat flexibility. Furthermore, red-tailed hawks are apparently equally capable of killing goshawks as goshawks are of killing them (killings are more one-sided in buzzard-goshawk interactions in favour of the latter).

Other raptorial birds, including many of similar or mildly larger size than common buzzards themselves, may dominate or displace the buzzard, especially with aims to take over their nests. Species such as the black kite (Milvus migrans), booted eagle (Hieraeetus pennatus) and the lesser spotted eagle have been known to displace actively nesting buzzards, although in some cases the buzzards may attempt to defend themselves. The broad range of accipitrids that take over buzzard nests is somewhat unusual. More typically, common buzzards are victims of nest parasitism to owls and falcons, as neither of these other kinds of raptorial birds builds their own nests, but these may regularly take up occupancy on already abandoned or alternate nests rather than ones the buzzards are actively using. Even with birds not traditionally considered raptorial, such as common ravens, may compete for nesting sites with buzzards. In urban vicinities of southwestern England, it was found that peregrine falcons (Falco peregrinus) were harassing buzzards so persistently, in many cases resulting in injury or death for the buzzards, the attacks tending to peak during the falcon's breeding seasons and tend to be focused on subadult buzzards. Despite often being dominated in nesting site confrontations by even similarly sized raptors, buzzards appear to be bolder in direct competition over food with other raptors outside of the context of breeding, and has even been known to displace larger birds of prey such as red kites (Milvus milvus) and female buzzards may also dominate male goshawks (which are much smaller than the female goshawk) at disputed kills.

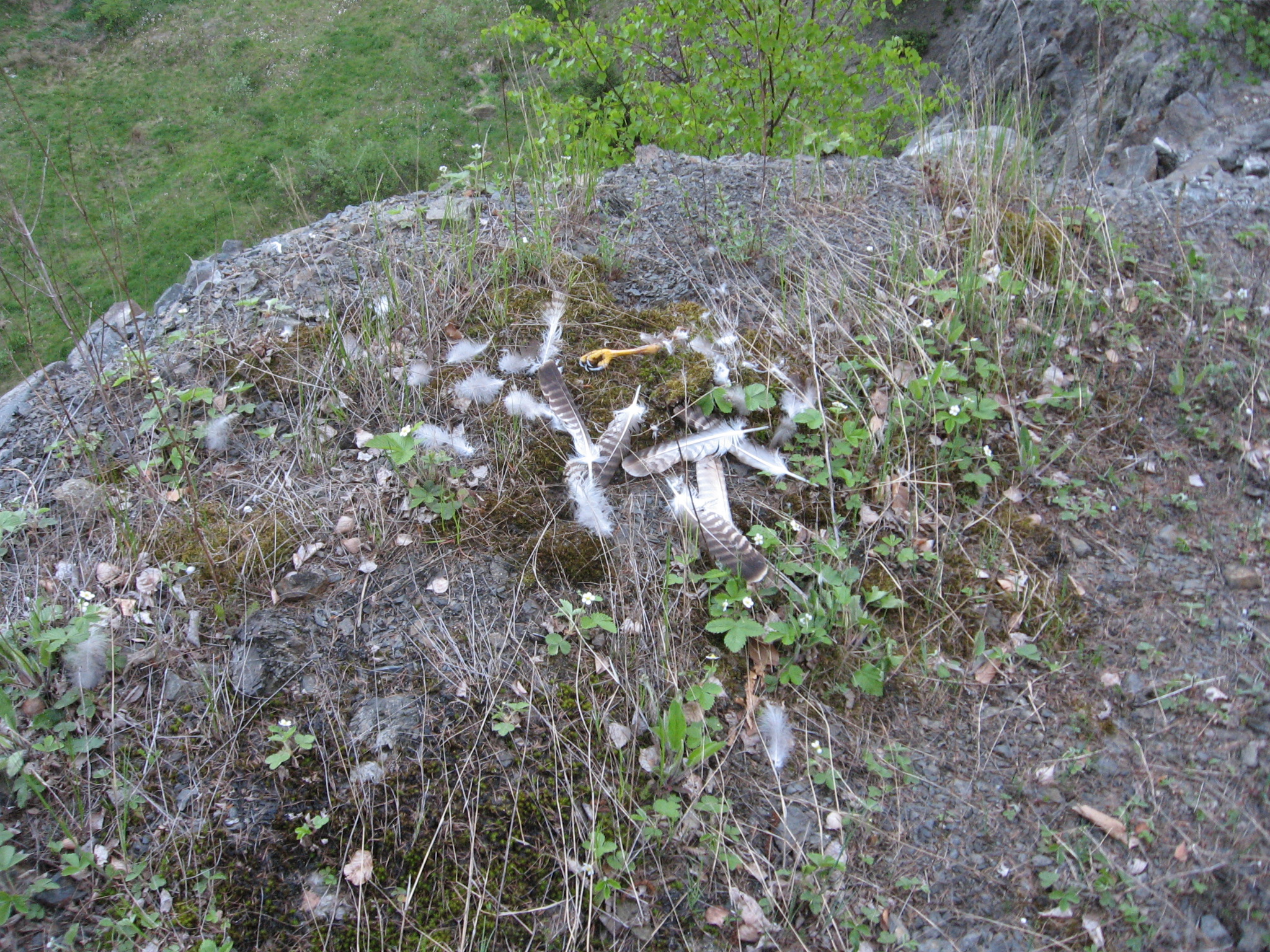
The remains of a common buzzard that was preyed on by a Eurasian eagle-owl

Common buzzards are occasionally threatened by predation by other raptorial birds. Northern goshawks have been known to have preyed upon buzzards in a few cases. Much larger raptors are known to have killed a few buzzards as well, including steppe eagles (Aquila nipalensis) on migrating steppe buzzards in Israel. Further instances of predation on buzzards have involved golden, eastern imperial (Aquila heliaca), Bonelli's (Aquila fasciata) and white-tailed eagles (Haliaeetus albicilla) in Europe. Besides preying on adult buzzard, white-tailed eagles have been known to raise buzzards with their own young. These are most likely cases of eagles carrying off young buzzard nestlings with the intention of predation but, for unclear reasons, not killing them. Instead the mother eagle comes to brood the young buzzard. Despite the difference of the two species diets, white-tailed eagles are surprisingly successful at raising young buzzards (which are conspicuously much smaller than their own nestlings) to fledging. Studies in Lithuania of white-tailed eagle diets found that predation on common buzzards was more frequent than anticipated, with 36 buzzard remains found in 11 years of study of the summer diet of the white-tailed eagles. While nestling buzzards were multiple times more vulnerable to predation than adult buzzards in the Lithuanian data, the region's buzzards expelled considerable time and energy during the late nesting period trying to protect their nests. The most serious predator of common buzzards, however, is almost certainly the Eurasian eagle-owl (Bubo bubo). This is a very large owl with a mean body mass about three to four times greater than that of a buzzard. The eagle-owl, despite often taking small mammals that broadly overlap with those selected by buzzards, is considered a "super-predator" that is a major threat to nearly all co-existing raptorial birds, capably destroying whole broods of other raptorial birds and dispatching adult raptors even as large as eagles. Due to their large numbers in edge habitats, common buzzards frequently feature heavily in the eagle-owl's diet. Eagle-owls, as will some other large owls, also readily expropriate the nests of buzzards. In the Czech Republic and in Luxembourg, the buzzard was the third and fifth most frequent prey species for eagle-owls, respectively. The reintroduction of eagle-owls to sections of Germany has been found to have a slight deleterious effect on the local occupancy of common buzzards. The only sparing factor is the temporal difference (the buzzard nesting later in the year than the eagle-owl) and buzzards may locally be able to avoid nesting near an active eagle-owl family. As the ecology of the wintering population is relatively little studied, a similar very large owl at the top of the avian food chain, the Verreaux's eagle-owl (Bubo lacteus), is the only known predator of wintering steppe buzzards in southern Africa. Despite not being known predators of buzzards, other large, vole-eating owls are known to displace or to be avoided by nesting buzzards, such as great grey owls (Strix nebulosa) and Ural owls (Strix uralensis). Unlike with large birds of prey, next to nothing is known of mammalian predators of common buzzards, despite up to several nestlings and fledglings being likely depredated by mammals.

Common buzzards themselves rarely present a threat to other raptorial birds but may occasionally kill a few of those of smaller size. The buzzard is a known predator of 237 g (8.4 oz) Eurasian sparrowhawks (Accipiter nisus), 184 g (6.5 oz) common kestrel and 152 g (5.4 oz) lesser kestrel (Falco naumanni) . Perhaps surprisingly, given the nocturnal habits of this prey, the group of raptorial birds the buzzard is known to hunt most extensively is owls. Known owl prey has included 419 g (14.8 oz) Western barn owls (Tyto alba), 92 g (3.2 oz) European scops owls (Otus scops), 475 g (16.8 oz) tawny owls (Strix aluco), 169 g (6.0 oz) little owls (Athene noctua), 138 g (4.9 oz) boreal owls (Aegolius funereus), 286 g (10.1 oz) long-eared owls (Asio otus) and 355 g (12.5 oz) short-eared owls (Asio flammeus). Despite their relatively large size, tawny owls are known to avoid buzzards as there are several records of them preying upon the owls.

== Breeding ==
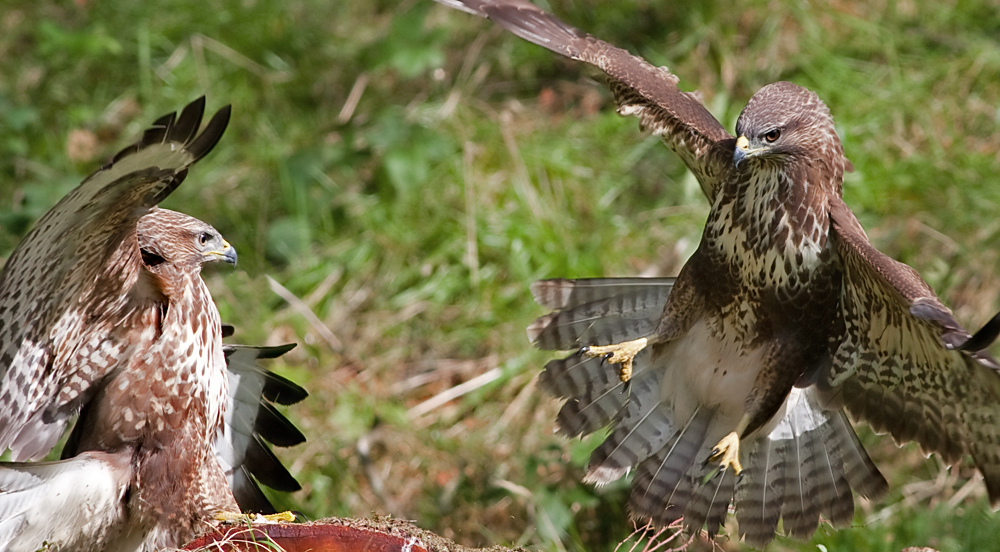
A pair of common buzzards in Scotland

=== Nesting territories and density ===
Home ranges of common buzzards are generally 0.5 to 2 km^{2} (0.19 to 0.77 sq mi). The size of breeding territory seem to be generally correlated with food supply. In a German study, the range was 0.8 to 1.8 km^{2} (0.31 to 0.69 sq mi) with an average of 1.26 km^{2} (0.49 sq mi). Some of the lowest pair densities of common buzzards seem to come from Russia. For instance, in Kerzhenets Nature Reserve, the recorded density was 0.6 pairs per 100 km^{2} (39 sq mi) and the average distance of nearest neighbors was 3.8 km (2.4 mi). The Snowdonia region of northern Wales held a pair per 9.7 km^{2} (3.7 sq mi) with a mean nearest neighbor distance of 1.95 km (1.21 mi); in adjacent Migneint, pair occurrence was 7.2 km^{2} (2.8 sq mi), with a mean distance of 1.53 km (0.95 mi). In the Teno massif of the Canary Islands, the average density was estimated as 23 pairs per 100 km^{2} (39 sq mi), similar to that of a middling continental population. On another set of islands, on Crete the density of pairs was lower at 5.7 pairs per 100 km^{2} (39 sq mi); here buzzards tend to have an irregular distribution, some in lower intensity harvest olive groves but their occurrence actually more common in agricultural than natural areas. In the Italian Alps, it was recorded in 1993–96 that there were from 28 to 30 pairs per 100 km^{2} (39 sq mi). In central Italy, density average was lower at 19.74 pairs per 100 km^{2} (39 sq mi). Higher density areas are known than those above. Two areas of the Midlands of England showed occupancies of 81 and 22 territorial pairs per 100 km^{2} (39 sq mi). High buzzard densities there were associated with high proportions of unimproved pasture and mature woodland within the estimated territories. Similarly high densities of common buzzards were estimated in central Slovakia using two different methods, here indicating densities of 96 to 129 pairs per 100 km^{2} (39 sq mi). Despite claims from the study of the English midlands were the highest known territory density for the species, a number ranging from 32 to 51 pairs in wooded area of merely 22 km^{2} (8.5 sq mi) in Czech Republic seems to surely exceed even those densities. The Czech study suggested that fragmentation of forest in human management of lands for wild sheep and deer, creating exceptional concentrations of prey such as voles, and lack of appropriate habitat in surrounding regions for the exceptionally high density.

In the North Estonian Neeruti landscape reserve (area 1250 ha), Marek Vahula found 9 populated nests in 1989 and 1990. One nest was found in 1982 and is apparently the oldest known nest that is still populated today.

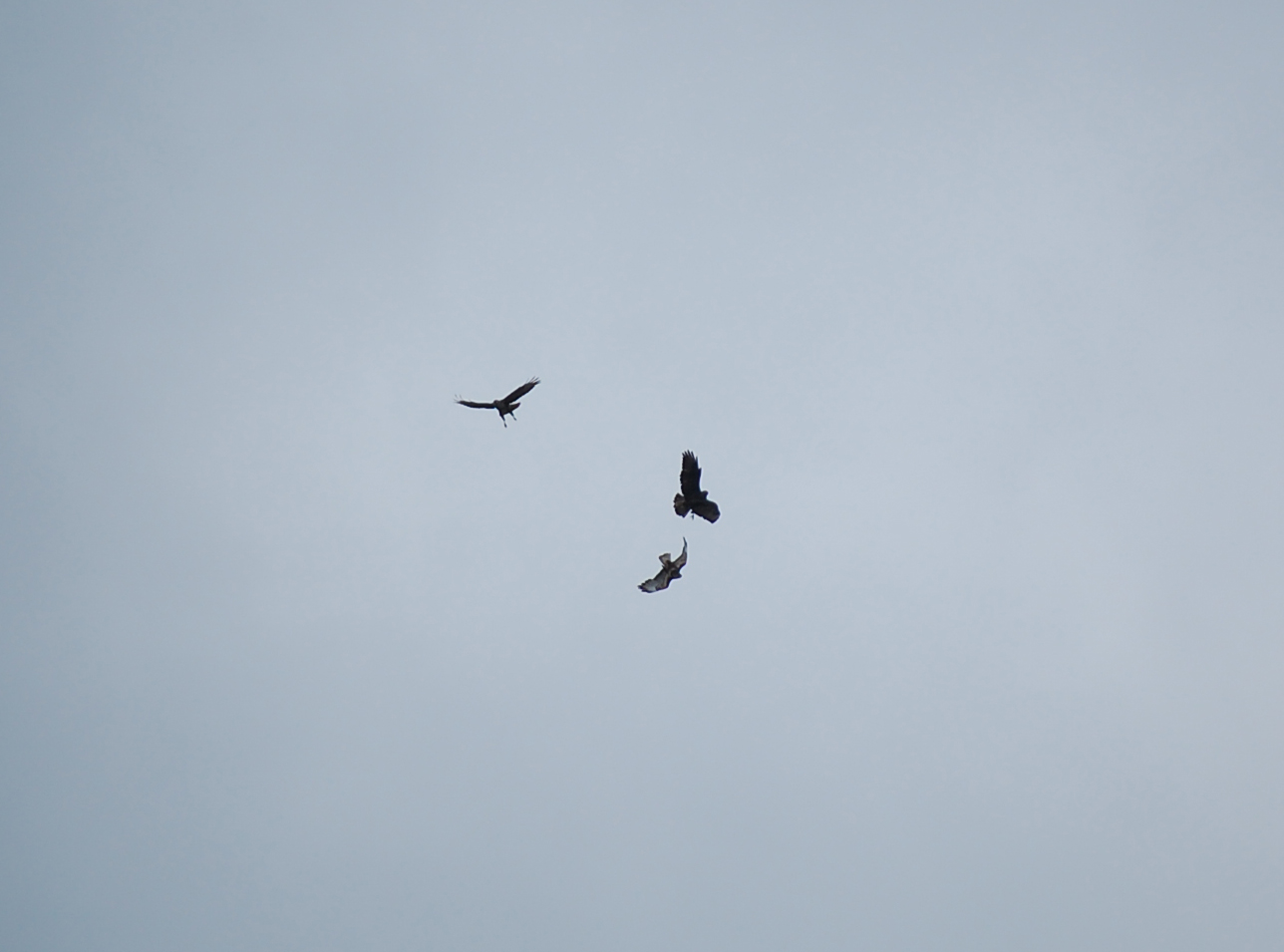
A territorial dogfight between three buzzards in the Azores

Common buzzards maintain their territories through flight displays. In Europe, territorial behaviour generally starts in February. However, displays are not uncommon throughout year in resident pairs, especially by males, and can elicit similar displays by neighbors. In them, common buzzards generally engage in high circling, spiraling upward on slightly raised wings. Mutual high circling by pairs sometimes go on at length, especially during the period prior to or during breeding season. In mutual displays, a pair may follow each other at 10–50 m (33–164 ft) in level flight. During the mutual displays, the male may engage in exaggerated deep flapping or zig-zag tumbling, apparently in response to the female being too distant. Two or three pairs may circle together at times and as many as 14 individual adults have been recorded over established display sites. Sky-dancing by common buzzards have been recorded in spring and autumn, typically by male but sometimes by female, nearly always with much calling. Their sky-dances are of the rollercoaster type, with upward sweep until they start to stall, but sometimes embellished with loops or rolls at the top. Next in the sky-dance, they dive on more or less closed wings before spreading them and shooting up again, upward sweeps of up to 30 m (98 ft), with dive drops of up to at least 60 m (200 ft). These dances may be repeated in series of 10 to 20. In the climax of the sky dance, the undulations become progressive shallower, often slowing and terminating directly onto a perch. Various other aerial displays include low contour flight or weaving among trees, frequently with deep beats and exaggerated upstrokes which show underwing pattern to rivals perched below. Talon grappling and occasionally cartwheeling downward with feet interlocked has been recorded in buzzards and, as in many raptors, is likely the physical culmination of the aggressive territorial display, especially between males. Despite the highly territorial nature of buzzards and their devotion to a single mate and breeding ground each summer, there is one case of a polyandrous trio of buzzards nesting in the Canary Islands.

=== Nests ===
Common buzzards tend to build a bulky nest of sticks, twigs and often heather. Commonly, nests are up to 1 to 1.2 m (3 ft 3 in to 3 ft 11 in) across and 60 cm (24 in) deep. With reuse over years, the diameter can reach or exceed 1.5 m (4 ft 11 in) and weight of nests can reach over 200 kg (440 lb). Active nests tend to be lined with greenery, most often this consists of broad-leafed foliage but sometimes also includes rush or seaweed locally. Nest height in trees is commonly 3 to 25 m (9.8 to 82.0 ft), usually by main trunk or main crutch of the tree. In Germany, trees used for nesting consisted mostly of red beeches (Fagus sylvatica) (in 337 cases), whereas a further 84 were in assorted oaks. Buzzards were recorded to nest almost exclusively in pines in Spain at a mean height of 14.5 m (48 ft). Trees are generally used for a nesting location but they will also use crags or bluffs if trees are unavailable. Buzzards in one English study were surprisingly partial to nesting on well-vegetated banks and due to the rich surrounding environment habitat and prey population, were actually more productive than nests located in other locations here. Furthermore, a few ground nests were recorded in high prey-level agricultural areas in the Netherlands. In the Italian Alps, 81% of 108 nests were on cliffs. The common buzzard generally lacks the propensity of its Nearctic counterpart, the red-tailed hawk, to occasionally nest on or near manmade structures (often in heavily urbanised areas) but in Spain some pairs recorded nesting along the perimeter of abandoned buildings. Pairs often have several nests but some pairs may use one over several consecutive years. Two to four alternate nests in a territory is typical for common buzzards, especially those breeding further north in their range.

=== Reproduction and eggs ===
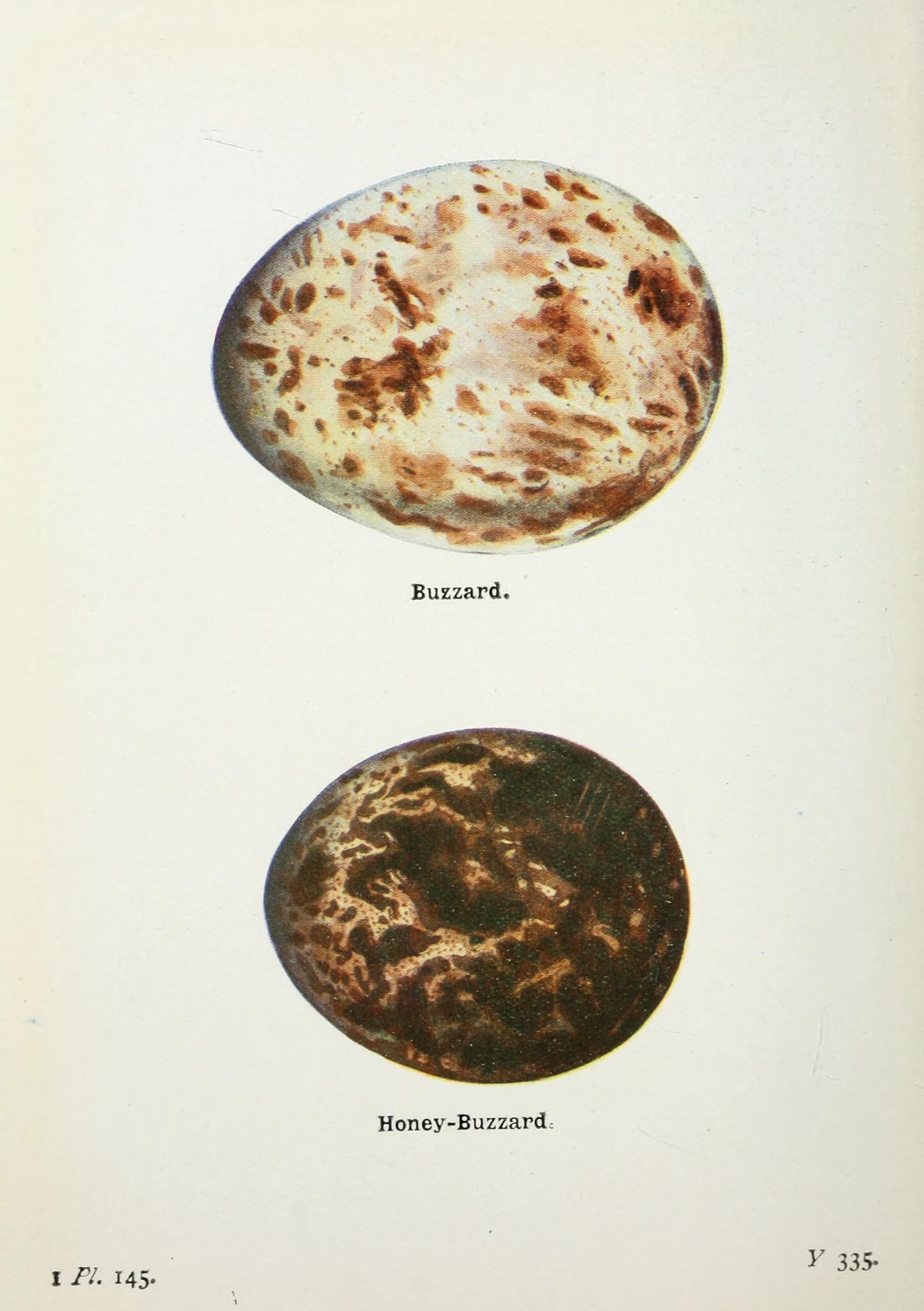
The much plainer egg of the common buzzard contrasted with that of the European honey buzzard

The breeding season commences at differing times based on latitude. Common buzzard breeding seasons may fall as early as January to April but typically the breeding season is March to July in much of Palearctic. In the northern stretches of the range the breeding season may last into May–August. Mating usually occurs on or near the nest and lasts about 15 seconds, typically occurring several times a day. Eggs are usually laid in 2 to 3-day intervals. The clutch size can range from to 2 to 6, a relatively large clutch for an accipitrid. More northerly and westerly buzzard usually bear larger clutches, which average nearer 3, than those further east and south. In Spain, the average clutch size is about 2 to 2.3. From 4 locations in different parts of Europe, 43% had clutch size of 2, 41% had size of 3, clutches of 1 and 4 each constituted about 8%.

Laying dates are remarkably constant throughout Great Britain. There are, however, highly significant differences in clutch size between British study areas. These do not follow any latitudinal gradient and it is likely that local factors such as habitat and prey availability are more important determinants of clutch size. The eggs are white in ground colour, rather round in shape with sporadic red to brown markings sometimes lightly showing. In the nominate subspecies, egg size is 49.8–63.8 mm (1.96–2.51 in) in long by 39.1–48.2 mm (1.54–1.90 in) in diameter with an average of 55 mm × 44 mm (2.2 in × 1.7 in) in 600 eggs. In the subspecies B. b. vulpinus, egg length is 48–63 mm (1.9–2.5 in) by 39.2–47.5 mm (1.54–1.87 in) diameter, with an average of 54.2 mm × 42.8 mm (2.13 in × 1.69 in) in 303 eggs. Eggs are generally laid in late March to early April in extreme south, sometime in April in most of Europe, into May and possibly even early June in the extreme north. If eggs are lost to a predator (including humans) or fail in some other way, common buzzards do not usually lay replacement clutches but they have been recorded, even with 3 attempts of clutches by a single female. The female does most but not all of the incubating, doing so for a total of 33–35 days. The female remains at the nest brooding the young in the early stages with the male bringing all prey. At about 8–12 days, both the male and female will bring prey but the female continues to do all feeding until the young can tear up their own prey.

=== Development of young ===
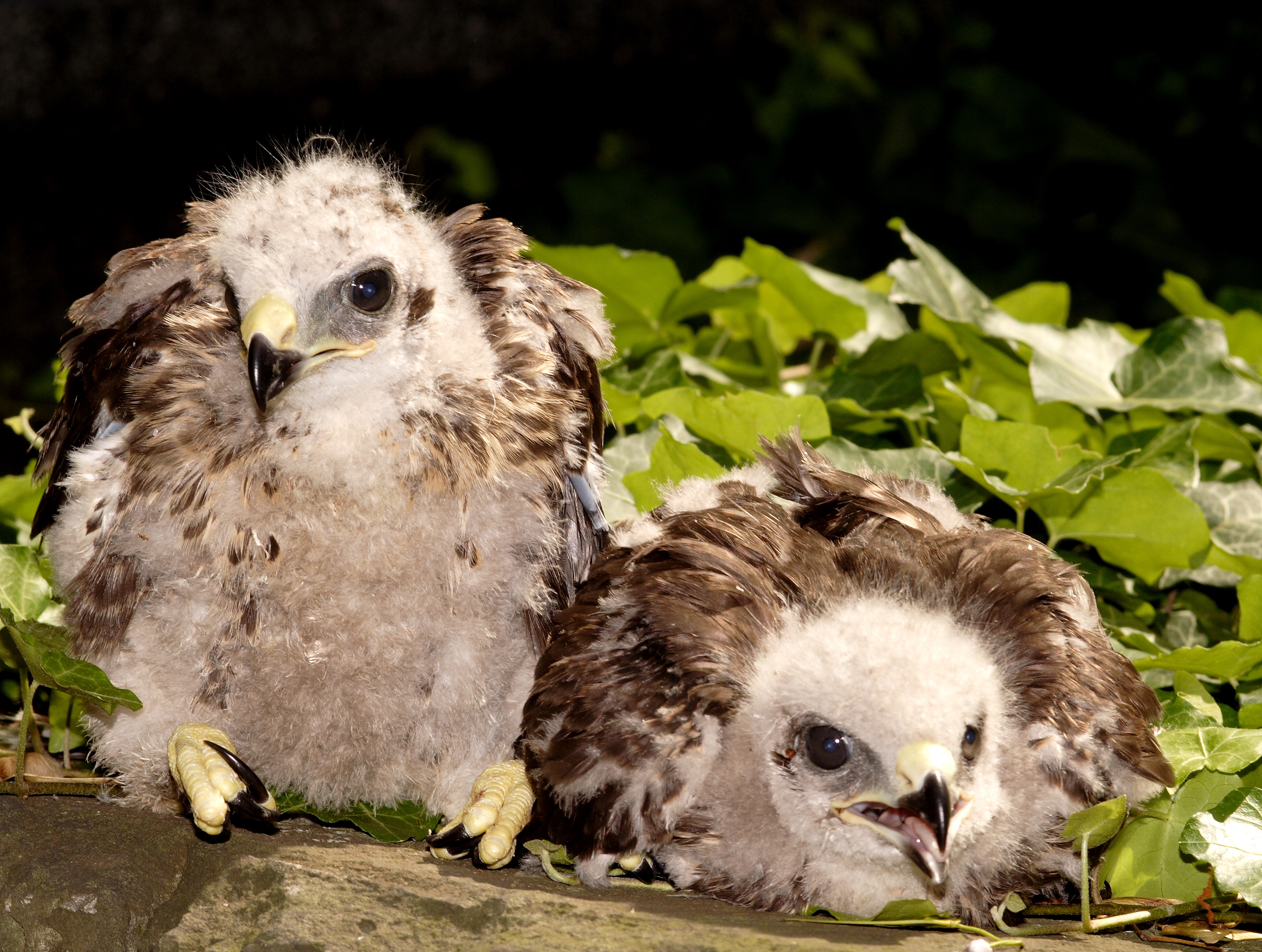
Two young buzzard nestlings

Once hatching commences, it may take 48 hours for the chick to chip out. Hatching may take place over 3–7 days, with new hatchlings averaging about 45 g (1.6 oz) in body mass. Often the youngest nestling dies from starvation, especially in broods of three or more. In nestlings, the first down replaces by longer, coarser down at about 7 days of age with the first proper feathers appearing at 12 to 15 days. The young are nearly fully feathered rather than downy at about a month of age and can start to feed themselves as well. The first attempts to leave the nest are often at about 40–50 days, averaging usually 40–45 in nominate buzzards in Europe, but more quickly on average at 40–42 in B. b. vulpinus. Fledging occurs typically at 43–54 days but in extreme cases at as late 62 days. Sexual dimorphism is apparent in European fledglings, as females often scale about 1,000 g (2.2 lb) against 780 g (1.72 lb) in males. After leaving the nest, buzzards generally stay close by, but with migratory ones there is more definitive movement generally southbound. Full independence is generally sought 6 to 8 weeks after fledging. 1st year birds generally remain in wintering area for following summer but then return to near area of origin but then migrate south again without breeding. Radio-tracking suggests that most dispersal, even relatively early dispersals, by juvenile buzzards is undertaken independently rather than via exile by parents, as has been recorded in some other birds of prey. In common buzzards, generally speaking, siblings stay quite close to each other after dispersal from their parents and form something of a social group, although parents usually tolerate their presence on their territory until they are laying another clutch. However, the social group of siblings disbands at about a year of age. Juvenile buzzards are subordinate to adults during most encounters and tend to avoid direct confrontations and actively defended territories until they are of appropriate age (usually at least 2 years of age). This was the case as well for steppe buzzard juveniles wintering in southern Africa, although in some cases juveniles were able to successfully steal prey from adults there.

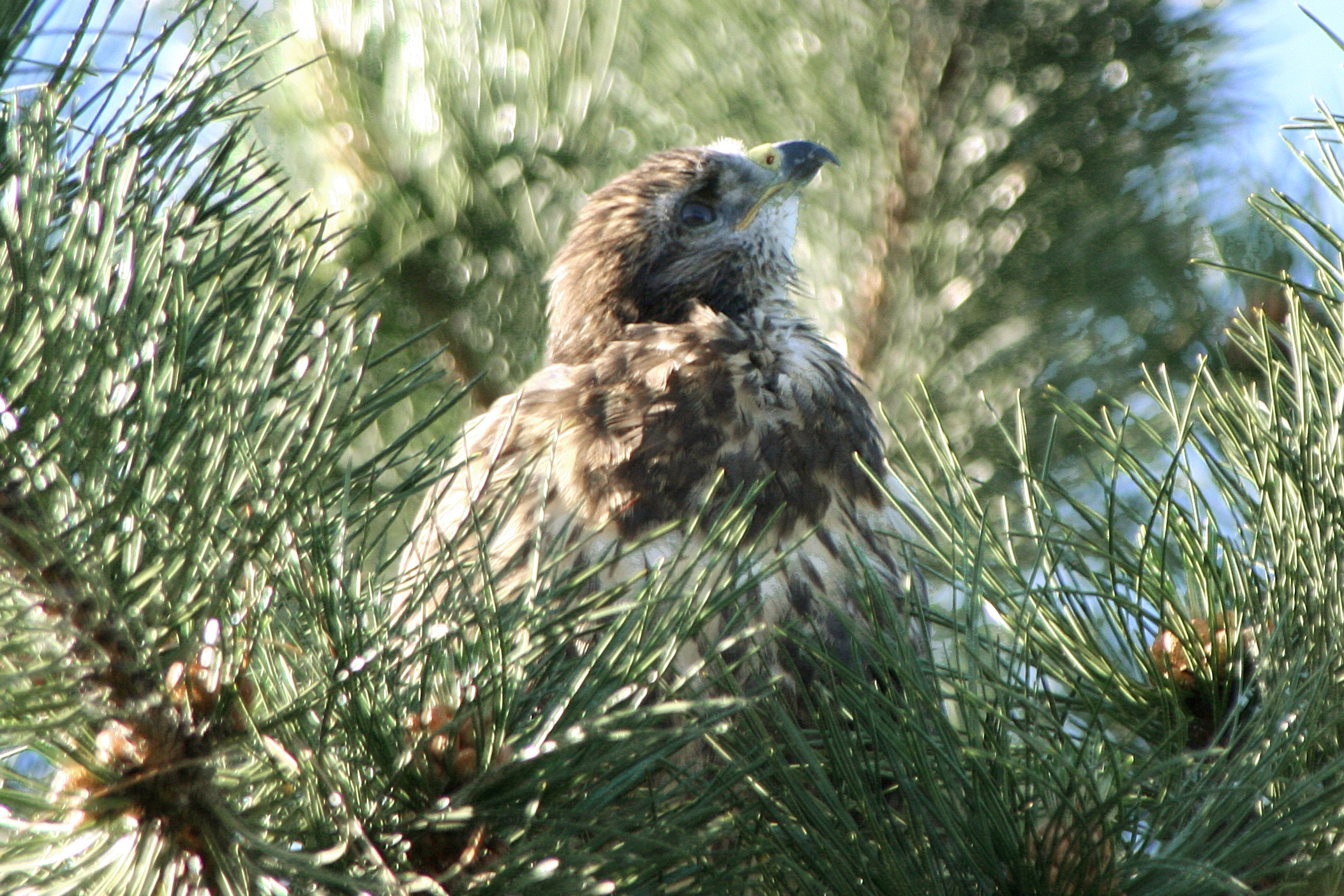
A common buzzard recent fledgling in a pine tree

=== Breeding success rates ===
Numerous factors may weigh into the breeding success of common buzzards. Chiefly among these are prey populations, habitat, disturbance and persecution levels and interspecies competition. In Germany, intra- and interspecific competition, plumage morph, laying date, precipitation levels and anthropogenic disturbances in the breeding territory, in declining order, were deemed to be the most significant bearers of breeding success. In an accompanying study, it was found that a mere 17% of adult birds of both sexes present in a German study area produced 50% of offspring, so breeding success may be lower than perceived and many adult buzzards for unknown causes may not attempt to breed at all. High breeding success was detected in Argyll, Scotland, due likely to hearty prey populations (rabbits) but also probably a lower local rate of persecution than elsewhere in the British isles. Here, the mean number of fledglings were 1.75 against 0.82–1.41 in other parts of Britain. It was found in the English Midlands that breeding success both by measure of clutch size and mean number of fledglings, was relatively high due to high prey populations. Breeding success was lower farther from significant stands of trees in the Midlands and most nesting failures that could be determined occurred in the incubation stage, possibly in correlation with predation of eggs by corvids. More significant than even prey, late winter-early spring was found to be likely the primary driver of breeding success in buzzards from southern Norway. Here, even in peak vole years, nesting success could be considerably hampered by heavy snow at this crucial stage. In Norway, large clutches of 3+ were expected only in years with minimal snow cover, high vole populations and lighter rains in May–June. In the Italian Alps, the mean number of fledglings per pair was 1.07. 33.4% of nesting attempts were failures per a study in southwestern Germany, with an average of 1.06 of all nesting attempts and 1.61 for all successful attempt. In Germany, weather conditions and rodent populations seemed to be the primary drivers of nesting success. In Murcia part of Spain contrasted with Biscay to the north, higher levels of interspecific competition from booted eagles and northern goshawks did not appear to negatively affect breeding success due to more ample prey populations (rabbits again) in Murcia than in Biscay.

In the Westphalia area of Germany, it was found that intermediate colour morphs were more productive than those that were darker or lighter. For reasons that are not entirely clear, apparently fewer parasites were found to afflict broods of intermediate plumaged buzzard less so than dark and light phenotypes, in particular higher melanin levels somehow were found to be more inviting to parasitic organism that effect the health of the buzzard's offspring. The composition of habitat and its relation to human disturbance were important variables for the dark and light phenotypes but were less important to intermediate individuals. Thus selection pressures resulting from different factors did not vary much between sexes but varied between the three phenotypes in the population. Breeding success in areas with wild European rabbits was considerably effected by rabbit myxomatosis and rabbit haemorrhagic disease, both of which have heavily depleted wild rabbit population. Breeding success in formerly rabbit-rich areas were recorded to decrease from as much as 2.6 to as little as 0.9 young per pair. Age of first breeding in several radio-tagged buzzards showed only a single male breeding as early as his 2nd summer (at about a year of age). Significantly more buzzards were found to start breeding at the 3 summer but breeding attempts can be individually erratic given the availability of habitat, food and mates. The mean life expectancy was estimated at 6.3 years in the late 1950s, but this was at a time of high persecution when humans were causing 50–80% of buzzard deaths. In a more modern context with regionally reduced persecution rates, the lifespan expected can be higher (possibly in excess of 10 years at times) but is still widely variable due to a wide variety of factors.

== Status ==
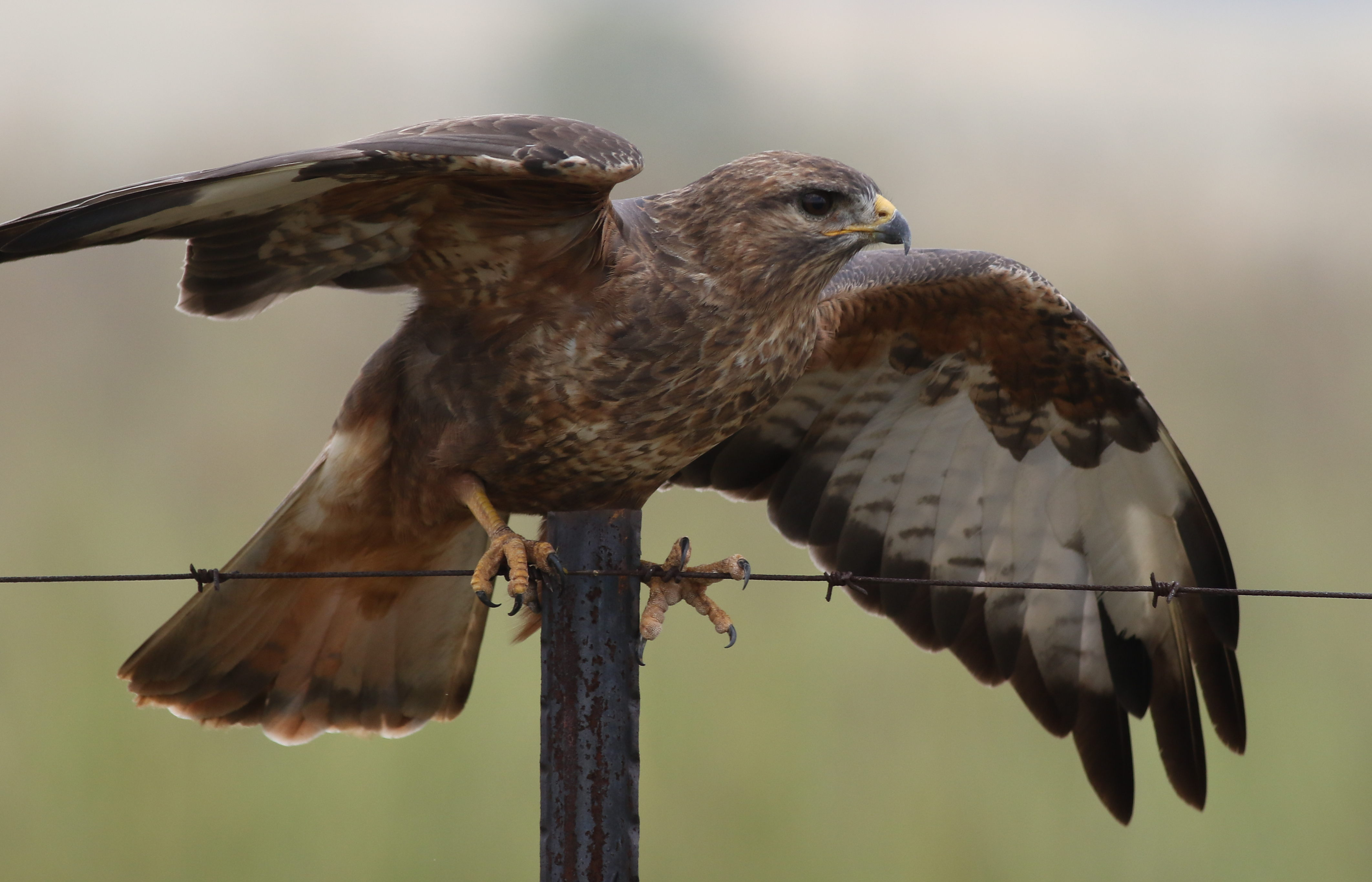
A wintering steppe buzzard in South Africa

The common buzzard is one of the most numerous birds of prey in its range. Almost certainly, it is the most numerous diurnal bird of prey throughout Europe. Conservative estimates put the total population at no fewer than 700,000 pairs in Europe, which are more than twice the total estimates for the next four birds of prey estimated as most common: the Eurasian sparrowhawk (more than 340,000 pairs), the common kestrel (more than 330,000 pairs) and the northern goshawk (more than 160,000 pairs). Ferguson-Lees et al. roughly estimated that the total population of the common buzzard ranges to nearly 5 million pairs but at time was including the now split-off species of eastern and Himalayan buzzards in those numbers. These numbers may be excessive but the total population of common buzzards is certain to total well over seven figures. More recently, the IUCN estimated the common buzzard (sans the Himalayan and eastern subspecies) to number somewhere between 2.1 and 3.7 million birds, which would put this buzzard one of the most numerous of all accipitrid family members (estimates for Eurasian sparrowhawks, red-tailed hawks and northern goshawks also may range over 2 million). In 1991, other than their absence in Iceland, after having been extant as breeder before 1910, buzzards recolonised Ireland sometime in the 1950s and has increased by the 1990s to 26 pairs. Supplemental feeding has reportedly helped the Irish buzzard population to rebound, especially where rabbits have decreased.

Most other countries have at least four figures of breeding pairs. As of the 1990s, other countries such as Great Britain, France, Switzerland, Czech Republic, Poland, Sweden, Belarus and Ukraine all numbered pairs well into five figures, while Germany had an estimated 140,000 pairs and European Russian may have held 500,000 pairs. Between 44,000 and 61,000 pairs nested in Great Britain by 2001 with numbers gradually increasing after past persecution, habitat alteration and prey reductions, making it by far the most abundant diurnal raptor there. In Westphalia, Germany, population of buzzards was shown to nearly triple over the last few decades. The Westphalian buzzards are possibly benefiting from increasingly warmer mean climate, which in turn is increasing vulnerability of voles. However, the rate of increase was significantly greater in males than in females, in part because of reintroduced Eurasian eagle-owls to the region preying on nests (including the brooding mother), which may in turn put undue pressure on the local buzzard population.

At least 238 common buzzards killed through persecution were recovered in England from 1975 to 1989, largely through poisoning. Persecution did not significantly differ at any time due this span of years nor did the persecution rates decrease, nor did it when compared to rates of last survey of this in 1981. While some persecution persists in England, it is probably slightly less common today. The buzzard was found to be the most vulnerable raptor to power-line collision fatalities in Spain probably as it is one of the most common largish birds, and together with the common raven, it accounted for nearly a third of recorded electrocutions. Given its relative abundance, the common buzzard is held as an ideal bioindicator, as they are affected by a range of pesticide and metal contamination through pollution like other raptors but are largely resilient to these at the population levels. In turn, this allows biologists to study (and harvest if needed) the buzzards intensively and their environments without affecting their overall population. The lack of affect may be due to the buzzard's adaptability as well as its relatively short, terrestrially-based food chain, which exposes them to less risk of contamination and population depletions than raptors that prey more heavily on water-based prey (such as some large eagles) or other birds (such as falcons). Common buzzards are seldom vulnerable to egg-shell thinning from DDT as are other raptors but egg-shell thinning has been recorded. Other factors that negatively effect raptors have been studied in common buzzards are helminths, avipoxvirus and assorted other viruses.

== Gallery ==
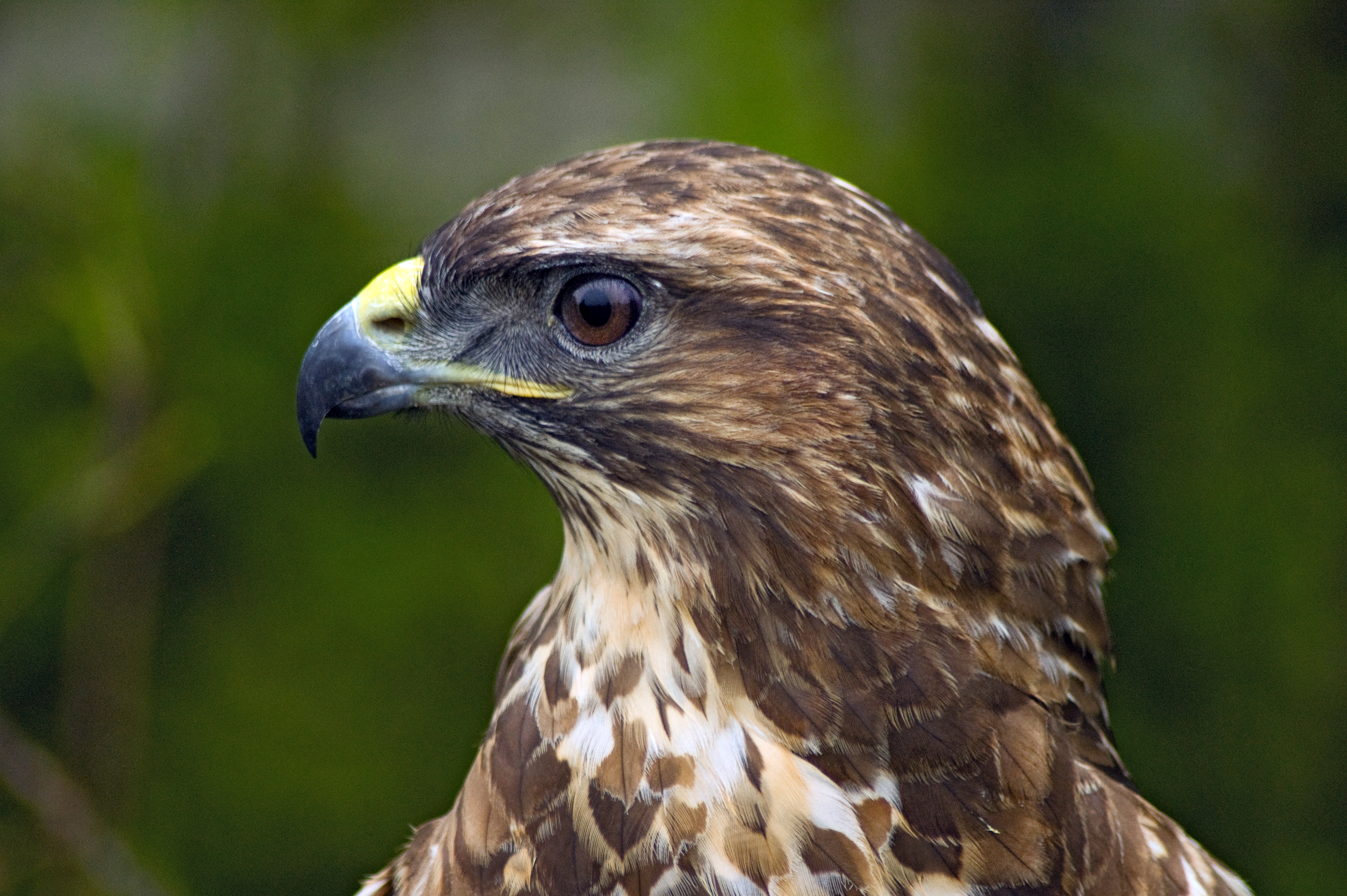
At Hamerton Zoo, England

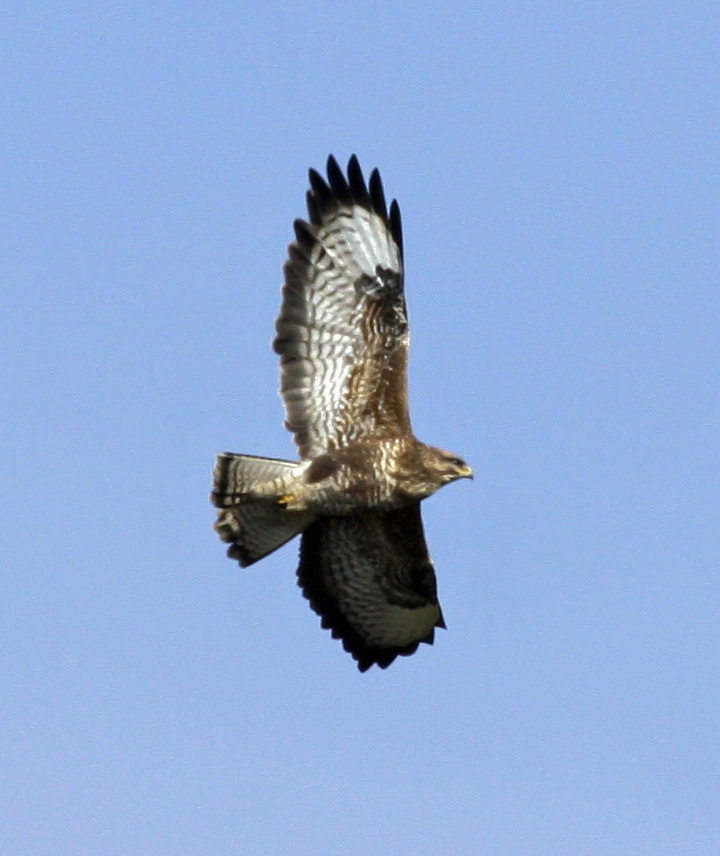
In flight, Devon, England. There are around 40,000 breeding pairs in the United Kingdom.

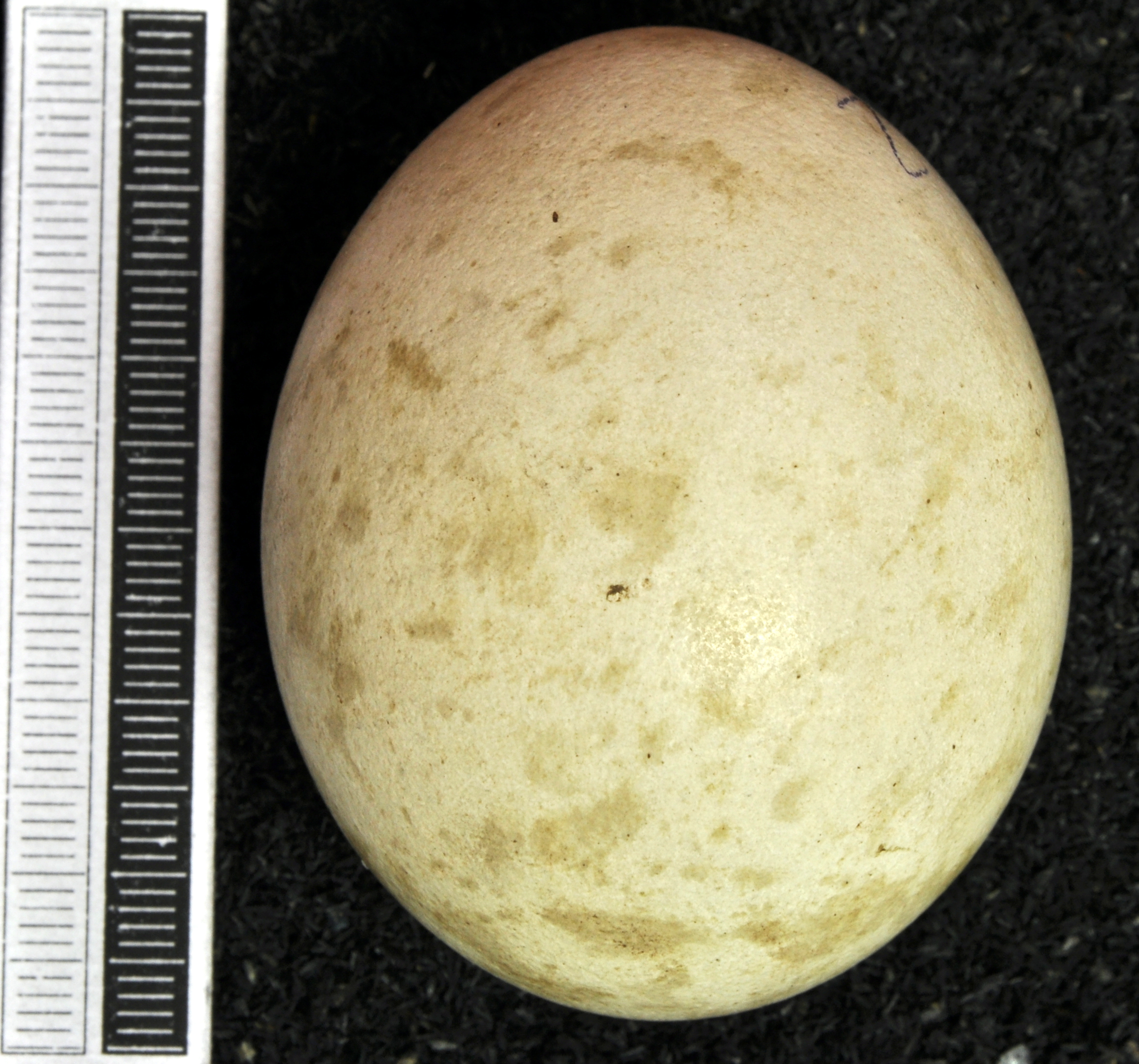
Egg, Collection Museum Wiesbaden

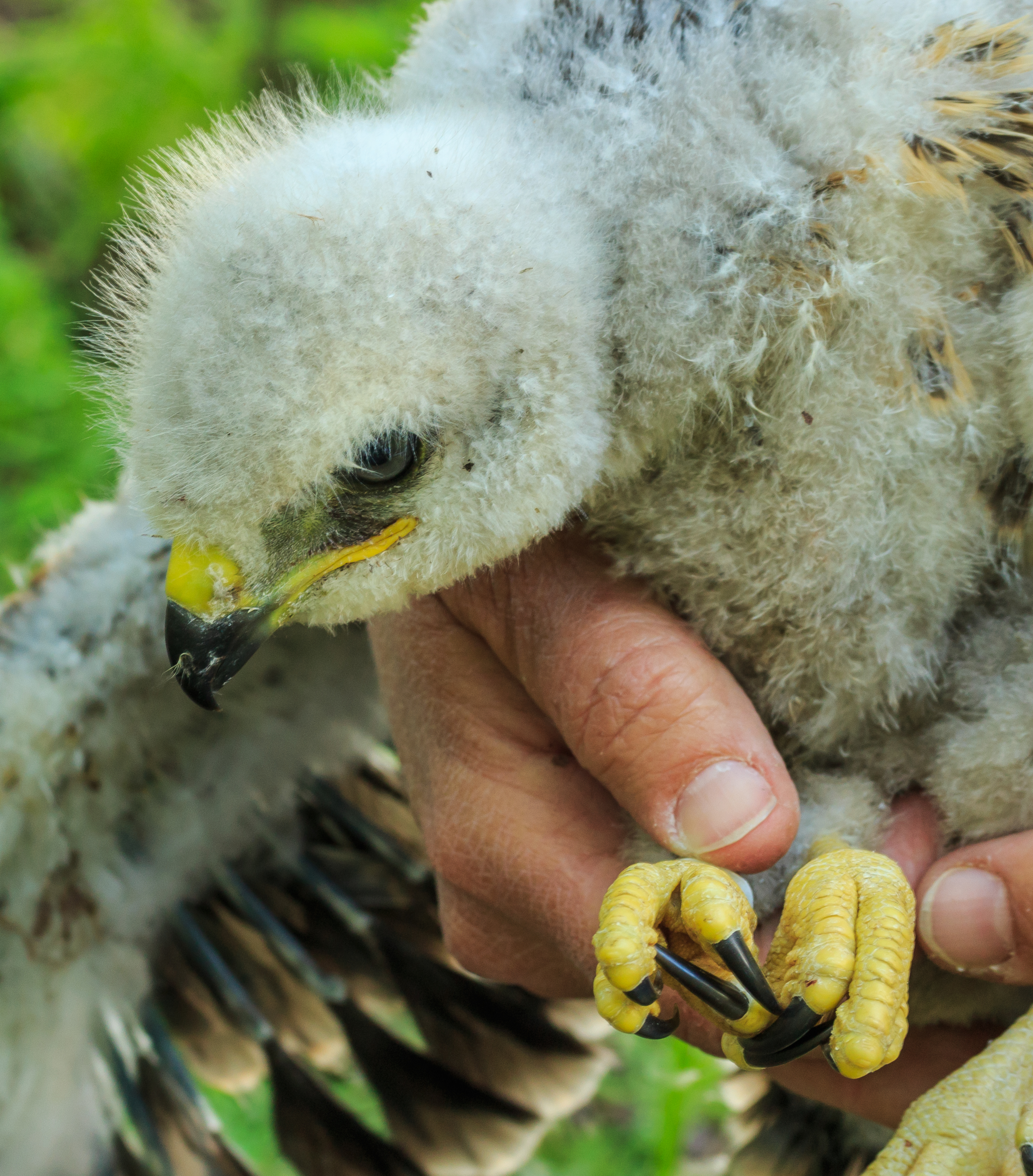
A young buzzard being ringed

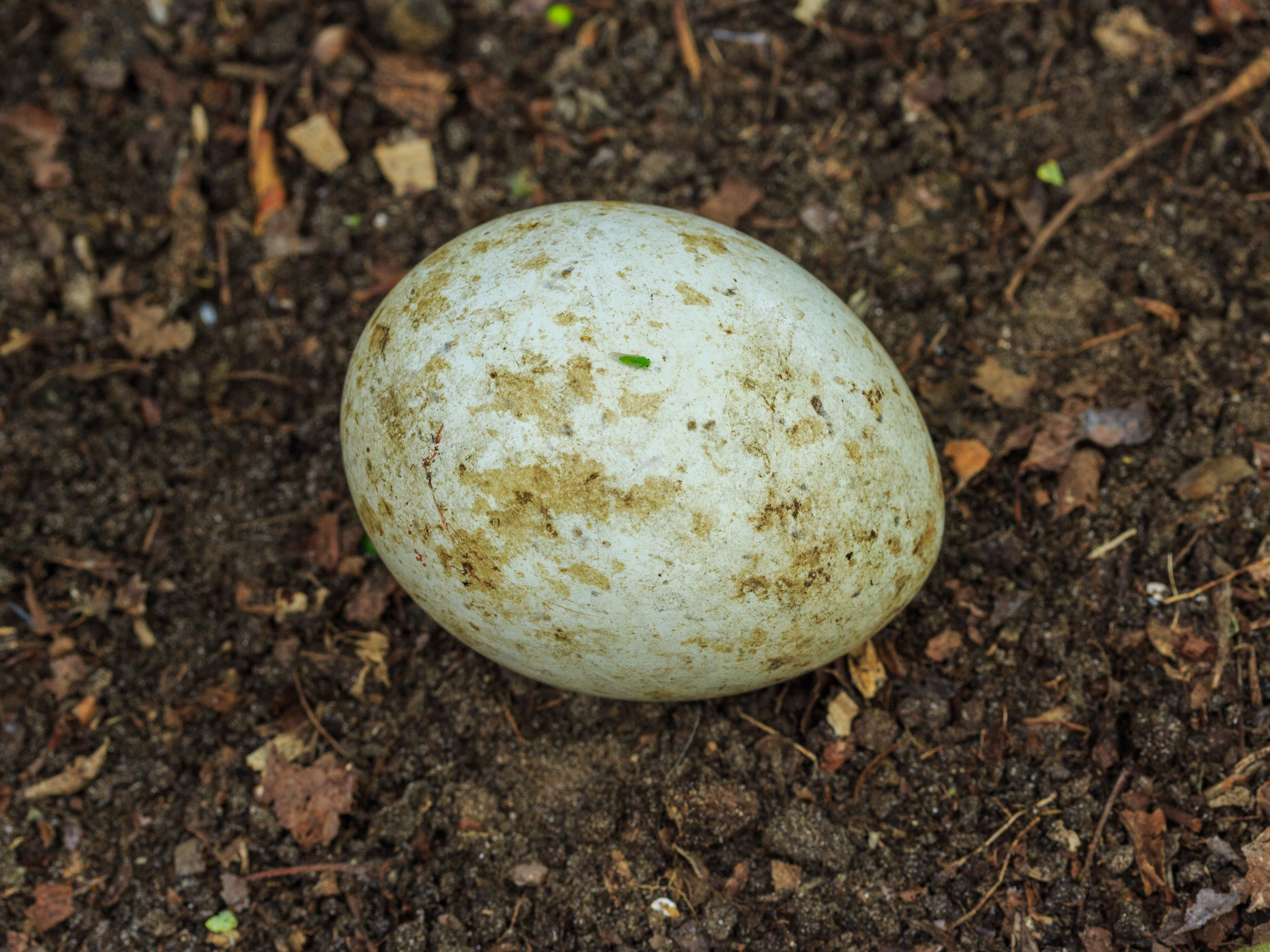
Infertile egg of a Buzzard (Buteo buteo)
