= Buzzard =

Buzzard is the common name of several species of birds of prey.

== Buteo species ==
- Archer's buzzard (Buteo archeri)
- Augur buzzard (Buteo augur)
- Broad-winged hawk (Buteo platypterus)
- Common buzzard (Buteo buteo)
- Eastern buzzard (Buteo japonicus)
- Ferruginous hawk (Buteo regalis)
- Forest buzzard (Buteo trizonatus)
- Galápagos hawk (Buteo galapagoensis)
- Grey hawk (Buteo plagiatus)
- Grey-lined hawk (Buteo nitidus)
- Hawaiian hawk (Buteo solitarius)
- Jackal buzzard (Buteo rufofuscus)
- Long-legged buzzard (Buteo rufinus)
- Madagascar buzzard (Buteo brachypterus)
- Mountain buzzard (Buteo oreophilus)
- Puna hawk (Buteo poecilochrous)
- Red-backed hawk (Buteo polyosoma)
- Red-necked buzzard (Buteo auguralis)
- Red-shouldered hawk (Buteo lineatus)
- Red-tailed hawk (Buteo jamaicensis)
- Ridgway's hawk (Buteo ridgwayi)
- Roadside hawk (Buteo magnirostris)
- Rough-legged buzzard (Buteo lagopus)
- Rufous-tailed hawk (Buteo ventralis)
- Short-tailed hawk (Buteo brachyurus)
- Swainson's hawk (Buteo swainsoni)
- Upland buzzard (Buteo hemilasius)
- White-rumped hawk (Buteo leucorrhous)
- White-tailed hawk (Buteo albicaudatus)
- White-throated hawk (Buteo albigula)
- Zone-tailed hawk (Buteo albonotatus)

== Other species ==
- Black-breasted buzzard (Hamirostra melanosternon)
- Black-chested buzzard-eagle (Geranoaetus melanoleucus)
- Grasshopper buzzard (Butastur rufipennis)
- Grey-faced buzzard (Butastur indicus)
- Honey-buzzards, genera Pernis and Henicopernis, superficially resembling Buteo buzzards, but are specialist feeders on wasp nests and larvae
  - Barred honey buzzard (Pernis celebensis)
  - Black honey buzzard (Henicopernis infuscatus)
  - Crested honey buzzard (Pernis ptilorhynchus)
  - European honey buzzard (Pernis apivorus)
  - Long-tailed honey buzzard (Henicopernis longicauda)
- Lizard buzzard (Kaupifalco monogrammicus)
- Rufous-winged buzzard (Butastur liventer)
- White-eyed buzzard (Butastur teesa)
- The turkey vulture (Cathartes aura) is commonly called a "turkey buzzard" in parts of the United States.
