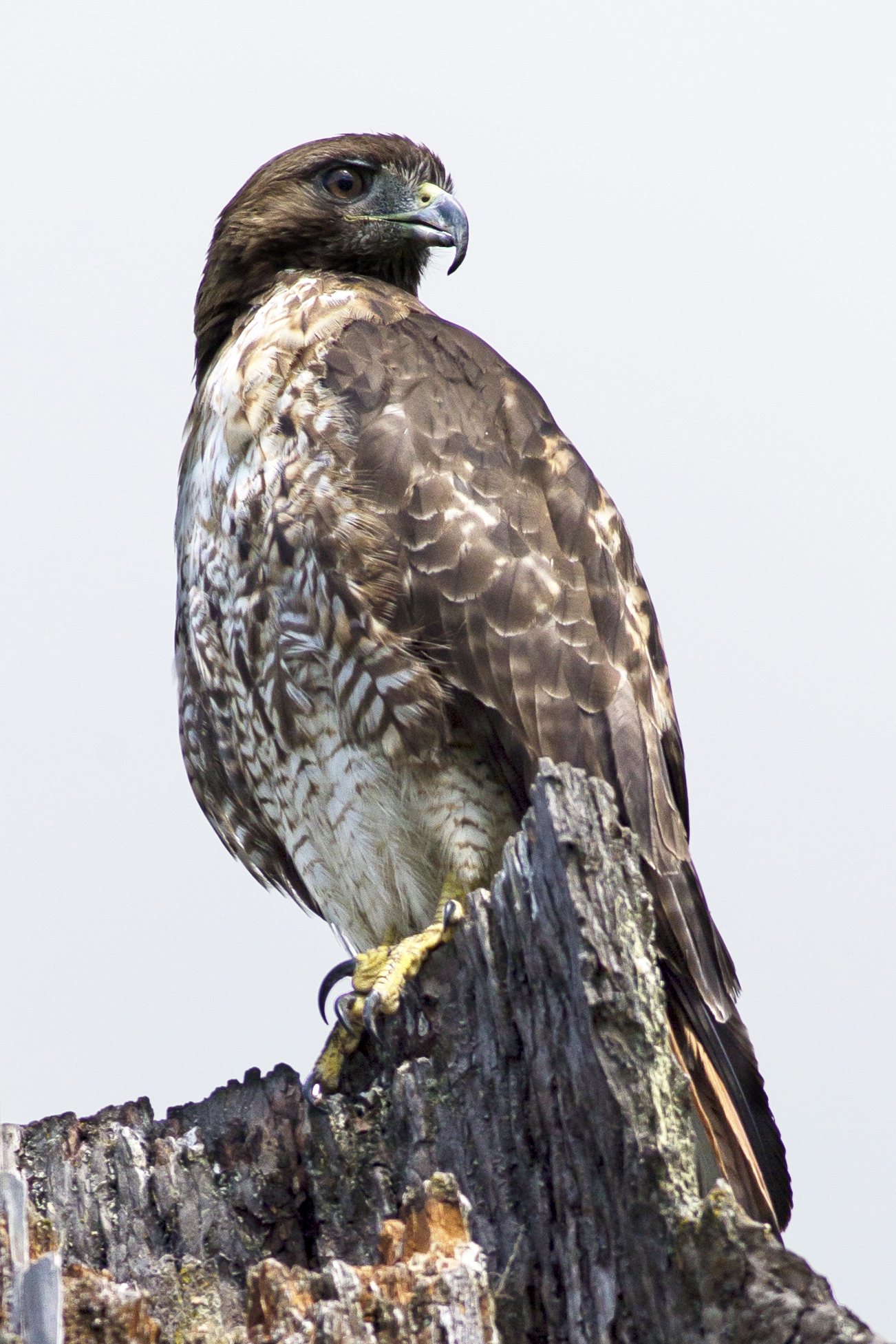
- Red-tailed hawk, Swan Lake, Victoria, BC

Scientific classification
- Kingdom: Animalia
- Phylum: Chordata
- Class: Aves
- Order: Accipitriformes
- Family: Accipitridae
- Genus: Buteo
- Species: B. jamaicensis
- Subspecies: B. j. alascensis

Trinomial name
- Buteo jamaicensis alascensis Grinnell, 1909

= Alaska red-tailed hawk =

Subspecies of bird

The Alaska red-tailed hawk (Buteo jamaicensis alascensis) is a subspecies of red-tailed hawk that breeds (and is probably resident) from southeastern coastal Alaska to Haida Gwaii (previously Queen Charlotte Islands) and Vancouver Island in British Columbia. Despite its northerly distribution, this is the second smallest of the red-tailed hawks. Only the Jamaican red-tailed hawk (B. j. jamaicensis) is smaller. Little is known about this subspecies compared to other subspecies of red-tailed hawk.

== Taxonomy and Systematics ==
The alaska red-tailed hawk was described by Joseph Grinnell (Glacier Bay, Alaska) in 1909 as "always blackest dorsally, and decidedly smaller" than a "large series" of the western red-tailed hawk (B. j. calurus). B. j. alascensis and B. j. calurus were previously considered to be the same subspecies.

=== Etymology and Taxonomy ===
The red-tailed hawk (Buteo jamaicensis) was described by Johann Friedrich Gmelin in 1788 as Falco jamaicensis. The name "jamaicensis" means "originating in Jamaica", referring to where the original specimen was found. Later, this hawk was placed in the genus Buteo, introduced by Bernard Germain de Lacépède in 1799. "Buteo" means "buzzard" in Latin. The subspecies B. j. alascensis is named after its main distribution in Alaska, with the suffix "-ensis" indicating origin.

=== Subspecies status and evidence ===
The alaska red-tailed hawk is one of 14 recognized subspecies of red-tailed hawk. It is understudied in comparison to other red-tail hawk subspecies and morphologically similar to other subspecies, B. j. calurus (Western red-tailed hawk). Taverner notes "they can be described as small calurus". Evidence for B. j. alascensis being distinct from B.j. calurus is less accurate than other subspecies belonging to Buteo jamaicensis.

== Description ==
=== Size ===
The largest females from this subspecies are smaller than almost all male red-tailed hawks from other subspecies in Canada. In wing chord, males range from 334 to 362 mm (13.1 to 14.3 in), averaging 346.5 mm (13.64 in), and females range from 358 to 363 mm (14.1 to 14.3 in), averaging 360.5 mm (14.19 in). Males and females average 227.6 and 226.9 mm (8.96 and 8.93 in) in tail length, 86.9 and 83.2 mm (3.42 and 3.28 in) in tarsal length and 24.4 and 26.4 mm (0.96 and 1.04 in) in culmen length.

=== Colouration ===
This race is darker than the pale morph of the western red-tailed hawk (B. j. calurus), nearly solidly dark brown above with almost no pale mottling on the scapulars. The breast is slightly rufous with dark arrowheads rather than streaking around the belly (although not all B. j. alascensis have the arrowheads, probably through hybridization with other races), meanwhile the rest of the underside down to the "trousers" is paler and more washed out than on B. j. calurus. Immatures of this race are usually blackish brown overall with a white throat and wide tail bands, rather unlike B. j. calurus. However, it can be challenging to distinguish juvenile North American buteos.

=== Identification ===
While the alaska and western red-tail hawk are not easy to tell apart, the main identifier is that the alaska subspecies is a smaller bird. Adult calurus wings measure over 368mm, while adult alascensis wings measure 368mm and under. B. j. alascensis is also said to have a rosy pink breast in comparison.

== Distribution ==
=== Range and Habitat ===
The range of alascensis spans coastal British Columbia including Haida Gwaii and western Vancouver Island all the way up to southeast Alaska. This bird inhabits the temperate rainforests of the Pacific Northwest.

=== Migration ===
Red-tailed hawks are partial migrants, exhibiting varying degrees of migration correlating to latitude. Subspecies occupying the northern third of their distribution (most of Canada and Alaska) are almost fully migratory, whereas many southern populations are fully sedentary. Despite their more northern distribution, red-tailed hawks present in the coastal north, such as the Pacific Northwest and southern Alaska, have been found not to participate in migration which would include the alaska red-tailed hawk.

== Behaviour ==
These hawks are diurnal birds, meaning they are most active during the day and inactive or asleep at night.

=== Flight ===
Soaring is the most common method of flight for members of the red-tailed hawk species as it conserves the most energy.

=== Reproduction and Courtship ===
Specific reproductive traits of the alaska red-tailed hawk subspecies are unknown however birds in the genus Buteo are typical in their breeding behaviours. Their courtship rituals involve soaring in large circles high in the sky, with the male performing dives. Red-tailed hawks are monogamous and will mate with the same individual until one dies.

=== Hunting strategies ===
Like many Buteos, members of the red-tailed hawk species hunt from a perch. Though North American red-tailed hawks can hunt from flight, it is generally uncommon.

=== Vocalizations ===
These are vocalizations common to red-tailed hawks as a species. There is likely variance within subspecies such as the alaska red-tailed hawk.

Vocalization table
Age	Sound	Reason	Source
Young nestling	pipsee	presence of parent or disturbance	
Juvenile	klee-uk	hunger call	
Adult	kee-eee-arr	irritation or defense response	

== Diet ==
The diet of alaska red-tailed hawks is quite varied as these birds are carnivorous and opportunistic eaters. Rodents such as squirrels, voles, rabbits, and hares constitute the bulk of their diet. They are also known to consume other birds, reptiles, fish, amphibians and invertebrates.

== Conservation ==
Red-tailed hawks as a species were last assessed in October 2016, with their global status deemed "Least concern" by the IUCN. The specific conservation status of the alaska red-tailed hawk subspecies is unknown.

=== Threats ===
The Alaskan government proposes that potential threats to red-tailed hawks in Alaska include environmental pollution, habitat loss and starvation. However, they state the first two threats are more unlikely, especially habitat loss, as red-tailed hawks are more adaptable compared to other raptors. Starvation affects many young, inexperienced hawks and is often the reason some do not survive their first year. Bad weather, parasites and injury are the main contributors to death by starvation in red-tailed hawks.
