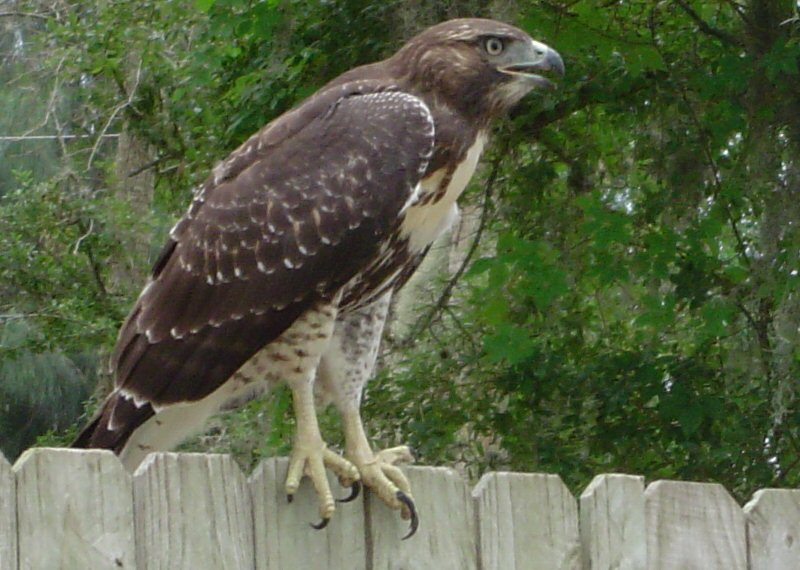

Scientific classification
- Kingdom: Animalia
- Phylum: Chordata
- Class: Aves
- Order: Accipitriformes
- Family: Accipitridae
- Genus: Buteo
- Species: B. jamaicensis
- Subspecies: B. j. umbrinus

Trinomial name
- Buteo jamaicensis umbrinus Bangs, 1901

= Florida red-tailed hawk =

Subspecies of bird

The Florida red-tailed hawk (Buteo jamaicensis umbrinus) is a subspecies of red-tailed hawk. It occurs year-round in peninsular Florida north as far as Tampa Bay and the Kissimmee Prairie and south down to the Florida Keys. This subspecies is very large, only the southwestern red-tailed hawk (B. j. fuertesi) averages larger in overall dimensions. Although a non-migratory subspecies, its wings are notably longer than those of the eastern red-tailed hawk (S. b. borealis) and S. b. umbrinus may be conspicuously larger than the relatively small southern S. b. borealis that they overlap with. The wing chord of males can range from 396 to 400 mm (15.6 to 15.7 in), averaging 398.8 mm (15.70 in), and, in females, it ranges from 373 to 432 mm (14.7 to 17.0 in), averaging 408.9 mm (16.10 in). Males and females average 225 and 234 mm (8.9 and 9.2 in) in tail length, 91.1 and 88.9 mm (3.59 and 3.50 in) in tarsal length and 27.2 and 30 mm (1.07 and 1.18 in) in culmen length. Compared to B. j. borealis which it replaces, it has a darker back, more similar to the dark brown of the western red-tailed hawk (B. j. calurus). Adults tend to have chestnut to rufous side patches, multiple tail bars and no barring on the "trousers". A very rare dark morph has been reported.
