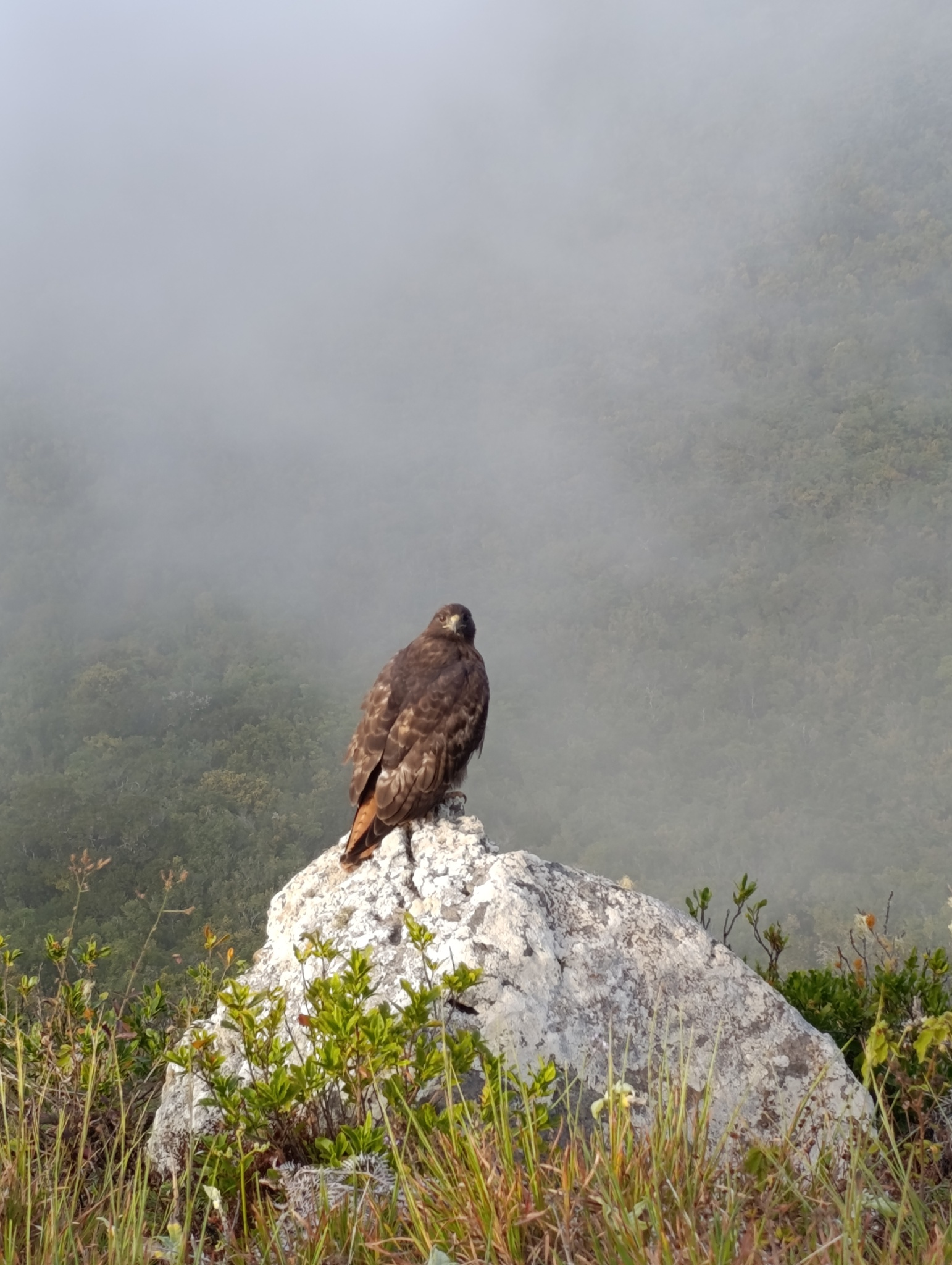

Scientific classification
- Kingdom: Animalia
- Phylum: Chordata
- Class: Aves
- Order: Accipitriformes
- Family: Accipitridae
- Genus: Buteo
- Species: B. jamaicensis
- Subspecies: B. j. socorroensis

Trinomial name
- Buteo jamaicensis socorroensis Nelson, 1898

= Socorro red-tailed hawk =

Subspecies of bird

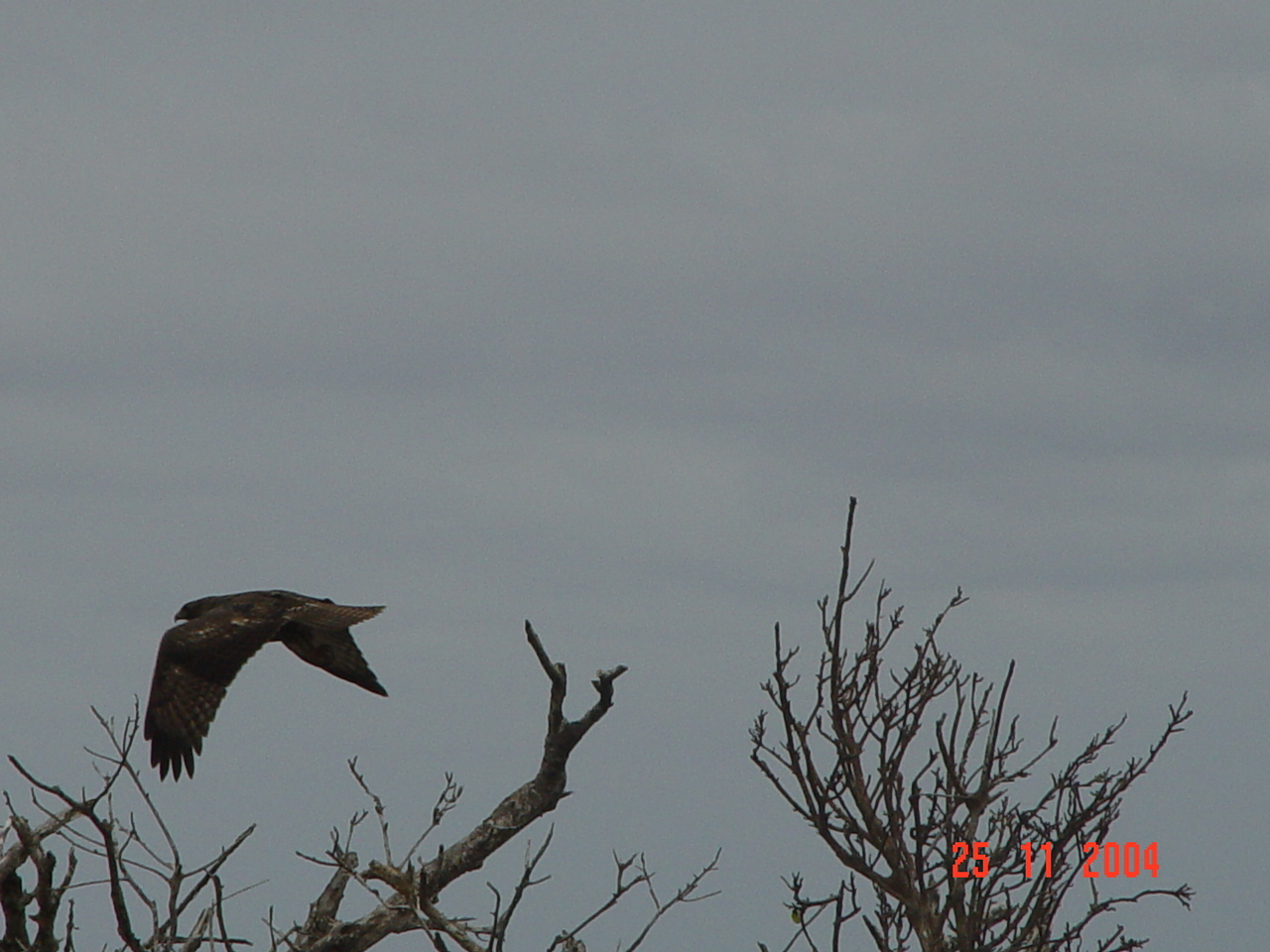

The Socorro red-tailed hawk (Buteo jamaicensis socorroensis) is a subspecies of red-tailed hawk endemic to Socorro Island, 600 kilometres (370 mi) off the west coast of Mexico. The wing chord of males can range from 368 to 385 mm (14.5 to 15.2 in), averaging 378.4 mm (14.90 in), and, in females, it ranges from 385 to 415 mm (15.2 to 16.3 in), averaging 412.8 mm (16.25 in). Males and females average 214.1 and 230.4 mm (8.43 and 9.07 in) in tail length, 84.9 and 89.1 mm (3.34 and 3.51 in) in tarsal length and 24.9 and 28.6 mm (0.98 and 1.13 in) in culmen length. One female was found to have weighed 1,260 g (2.78 lb). This race, which is physically fairly similar to the western red-tailed hawk (B. j. calurus), is not recognized by some authorities because it has a breeding population of perhaps fewer than 20 birds. There are some differences from B. j. calurus, such as their larger, more robust feet (second only among all races to the Mexican Highlands red-tailed hawk, B. j. hadropus) and much greater sexual dimorphism, which is the most pronounced of any race linearly, averaging 10.42% when all standard measurements are considered. Furthermore, Socorro hawks tend to average more melantic in overall color, being a duller, darker brown than mainland birds.
