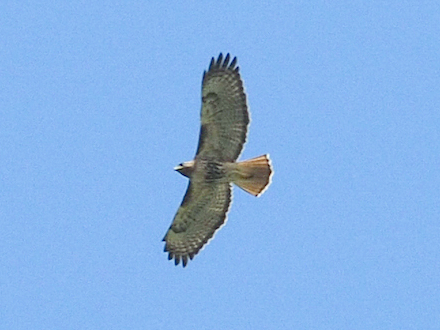

Scientific classification
- Domain: Eukaryota
- Kingdom: Animalia
- Phylum: Chordata
- Class: Aves
- Order: Accipitriformes
- Family: Accipitridae
- Genus: Buteo
- Species: B. jamaicensis
- Subspecies: B. j. solitudinus

Trinomial name
- Buteo jamaicensis solitudinus Barbour, 1935

= Cuban red-tailed hawk =

Subspecies of bird

The Cuban red-tailed hawk (Buteo jamaicensis solitudinus) is a subspecies of red-tailed hawk native to the Bahamas, Florida, and Cuba.

== Description ==
This subspecies is fairly small, intermediate in size between the Florida red-tailed hawk (B. j. umbrinus) and the nominate subspecies, the Jamaican red-tailed hawk (B. j. jamaicensis), found on islands to the north and south. The wing chord of males can range from 357 to 383 mm (14.1 to 15.1 in), averaging 370 mm (15 in), and, in females, it ranges from 397 to 412 mm (15.6 to 16.2 in), averaging 405.4 mm (15.96 in). Males and females average 221.2 and 251.8 mm (8.71 and 9.91 in) in tail length, 88.5 and 88.3 mm (3.48 and 3.48 in) in tarsal length, and 27.2 and 29.8 mm (1.07 and 1.17 in) in culmen length.

== Taxonomy ==
Like other island races, the validity of this subspecies has been called into question, but it has its defenders as well. Generally, this subspecies appears as a diminutive version of B. j. umbrinus in plumage characteristics but is considerably isolated from that race.
