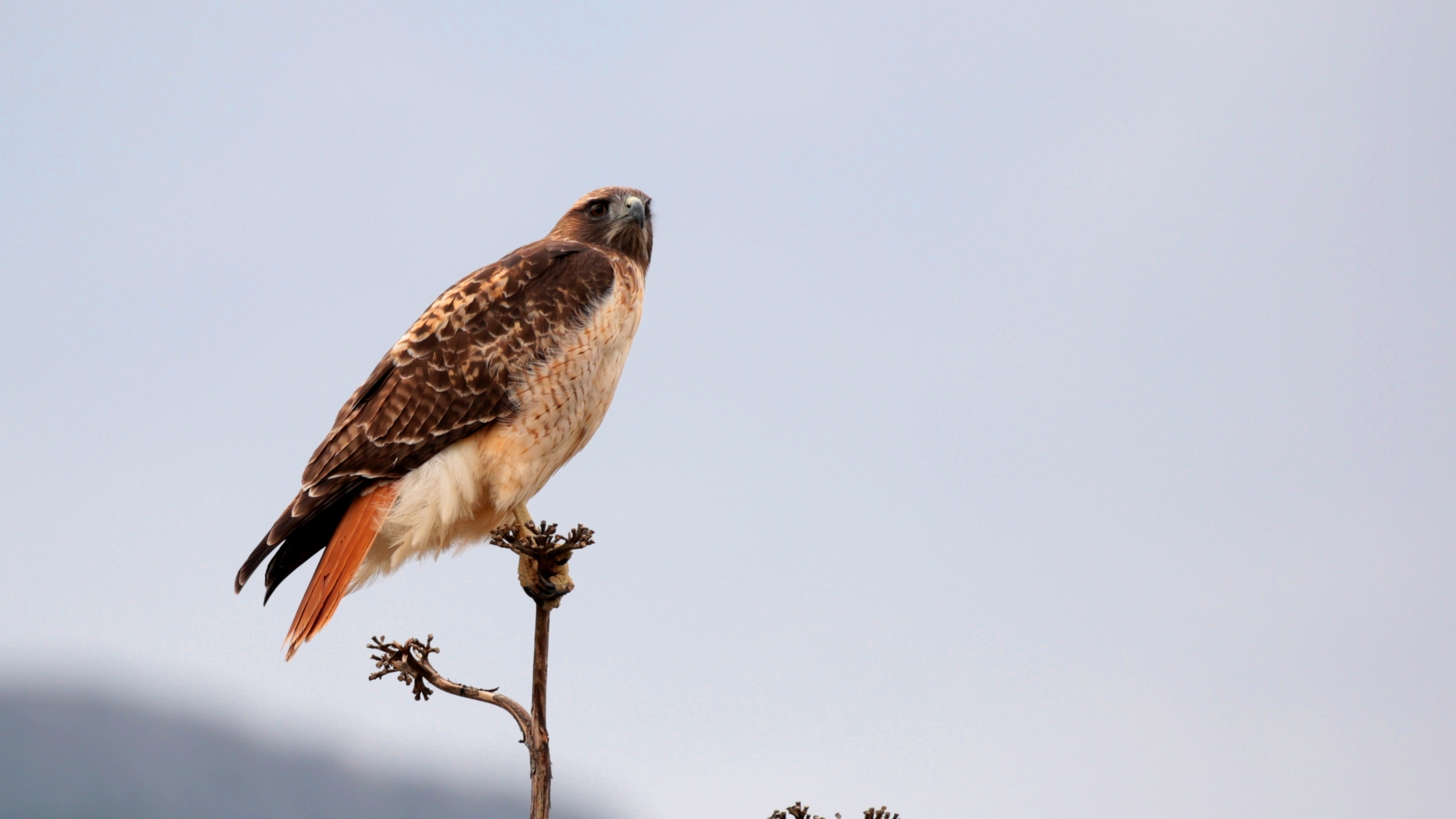
- Aguililla Cola Roja - panoramio

Scientific classification
- Domain: Eukaryota
- Kingdom: Animalia
- Phylum: Chordata
- Class: Aves
- Order: Accipitriformes
- Family: Accipitridae
- Genus: Buteo
- Species: B. jamaicensis
- Subspecies: B. j. fuertesi

Trinomial name
- Buteo jamaicensis fuertesi Sutton & Van Tyne, 1935

= Southwestern red-tailed hawk =

Subspecies of bird

The southwestern red-tailed hawk (Buteo jamaicensis fuertesi) is a subspecies of red-tailed hawk that breeds from northern Chihuahua to southern Texas. It winters in Arizona, New Mexico and southern Louisiana. This seems to be a particularly large subspecies, although its size is not drastically different from the western red-tailed hawk (B. j. calurus), and, going on average wing size and tarsal length, this appears to be the largest race of red-tailed hawk. The wing chord of males can range from 385 to 402 mm (15.2 to 15.8 in), averaging 393.3 mm (15.48 in), and, in females, it ranges from 425 to 436 mm (16.7 to 17.2 in), averaging 430.7 mm (16.96 in). Additionally, males and females average 210.9 and 223.8 mm (8.30 and 8.81 in) in tail length, 88 and 93 mm (3.5 and 3.7 in) in tarsal length and 26.3 and 27.5 mm (1.04 and 1.08 in) in culmen length. Hybridization seems to occur in eastern Texas with the eastern red-tailed hawk (B. j. borealis), broadly to the west with B. j. calurus and, possibly, in Nuevo León and Chihuahua with the Mexican Highlands red-tailed hawk (B. j. hadropus). This race combines the darker back of B. j. calurus with the paler underside of B. j. borealis, with the belly band either entirely absent or only manifesting in light streaking. The tail is variable but relatively pale, with some individuals showing almost no dark subterminal band, others having quite a broad subterminal band and some showing extensively barring on top like darker morphs of B. j. calurus.
