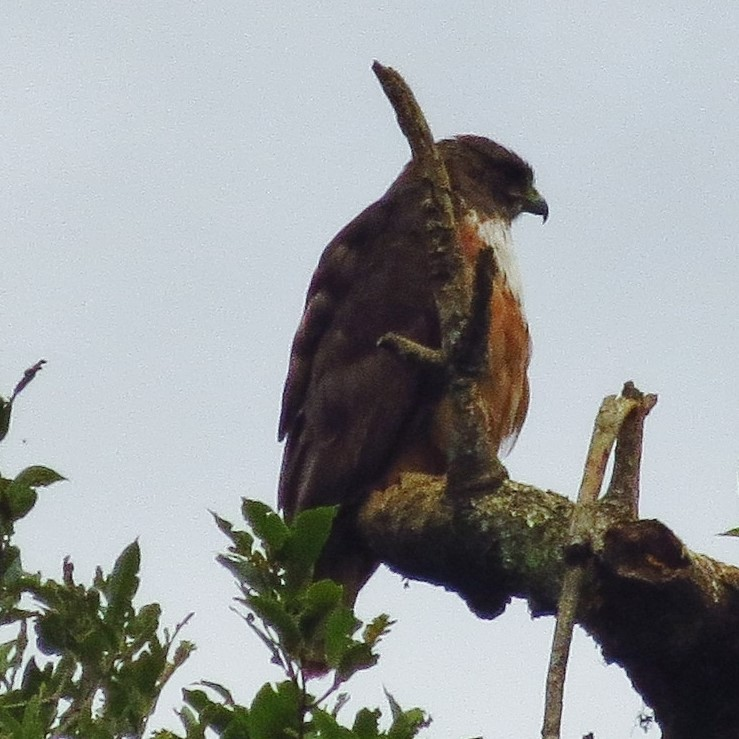
- B. j. costaricensis are among the most richly colored red-tailed hawks

Scientific classification
- Kingdom: Animalia
- Phylum: Chordata
- Class: Aves
- Order: Accipitriformes
- Family: Accipitridae
- Genus: Buteo
- Species: B. jamaicensis
- Subspecies: B. j. costaricensis

Trinomial name
- Buteo jamaicensis costaricensis Ridgway, 1874

= Central American red-tailed hawk =

Subspecies of bird

The Central American red-tailed hawk (Buteo jamaicensis costaricensis) is a subspecies of red-tailed hawk resident from Nicaragua to Panama. This subspecies is relatively small. The wing chord of males can range from 368 to 391 mm (14.5 to 15.4 in), averaging 372.7 mm (14.67 in), and, in females, it ranges from 393 to 427 mm (15.5 to 16.8 in), averaging 401.9 mm (15.82 in). Additionally, males and females average 213.2 and 230 mm (8.39 and 9.06 in) in tail length, 88.6 and 86.9 mm (3.49 and 3.42 in) in tarsal length and 26 and 26.7 mm (1.02 and 1.05 in) in culmen length. This race may average around 900 g (2.0 lb). This subspecies is arguably the most handsomely colored in typical adult plumage. This subspecies is dark brown above and heavily pigmented dorsally, the white of the breast contrasting with a deep rufous abdominal band which contains black streaks and spots. Meanwhile, the flanks, wing linings and sides are an unbarred deep rufous. In some birds, the rich rufous color continues to the underside. The chest is much less heavily streaked than in northern migrants western red-tailed hawk (B. j. calurus) to Central America. Unlike other Central American races of red-tailed hawk, there seems to be no dark morph in this subspecies.
