= Asturina =

Asturina can refer to:

- Asturina cola estrella bermeya (Asturina with the red star), symbol of Asturian independence used by certain parties
- Genus Asturina, a synonym for Buteo including in particular the gray hawk and gray-lined hawk
