= Buteo jamaicensis kemsiesi =

Red-tailed hawk (kemsiesi)

Scientific classification
- Kingdom: Animalia
- Phylum: Chordata
- Class: Aves
- Order: Accipitriformes
- Family: Accipitridae
- Genus: Buteo
- Species: B. jamaicensis
- Subspecies: B. j. kemsiesi

Trinomial name
- Buteo jamaicensis kemsiesi Oberholser, 1959

Subspecies of bird

The red-tailed hawk kemsiesi (Buteo jamaicensis kemsiesi) is a dark subspecies of red-tailed hawk resident from Chiapas, Mexico, to Nicaragua. The wing chord of males can range from 357 to 382 mm (14.1 to 15.0 in), averaging 376 mm (14.8 in), and, in females, it ranges from 362 to 402 mm (14.3 to 15.8 in), averaging 398.2 mm (15.68 in). Males and females average 212.5 and 231 mm (8.37 and 9.09 in) in tail length, 87.8 and 87.1 mm (3.46 and 3.43 in) in tarsal length and 26.1 and 26.4 mm (1.03 and 1.04 in) in culmen length. This race is similar to the southwestern red-tailed hawk (B. j. fuertesi) but markedly smaller, with its thighs barred with rufous. The dark wing marking may not be distinct in paler birds. A dark morph, similar to the western red-tailed hawk (B. j. calurus), is known to occur in this race.
