= Tres Marias red-tailed hawk =

Scientific classification
- Kingdom: Animalia
- Phylum: Chordata
- Class: Aves
- Order: Accipitriformes
- Family: Accipitridae
- Genus: Buteo
- Species: B. jamaicensis
- Subspecies: B. j. fumosus

Trinomial name
- Buteo jamaicensis fumosus Nelson, 1898

Subspecies of bird

The Tres Marias red-tailed hawk (Buteo jamaicensis fumosus) is a relatively small subspecies of red-tailed hawk endemic to Islas Marías, an island some 100 km (62 mi) off the coast of Mexico. Unlike some other island races, the validity of this race has rarely been called into question. The wing chord of males can range from 368 to 370 mm (14.5 to 14.6 in), averaging 369.3 mm (14.54 in), and, in females, it ranges from 395 to 400 mm (15.6 to 15.7 in), averaging 397.4 mm (15.65 in). Males and females average 228.9 and 235.5 mm (9.01 and 9.27 in) in tail length, 85.9 and 88.3 mm (3.38 and 3.48 in) in tarsal length and 27.4 and 29.2 mm (1.08 and 1.15 in) in culmen length. This race is similar to the western red-tailed hawk (B. j. calurus) but, beyond being noticeably smaller, is duskier and duller hued overall and has a more cinnamon wash below, with heavily dark barred thighs.
