= Wing chord =

Wing chord may refer to:

- Wing chord (biology), an anatomical measurement of the wing of birds
- Chord (aeronautics), the width of an aircraft's wing
