= Mexican Highlands red-tailed hawk =

Scientific classification
- Kingdom: Animalia
- Phylum: Chordata
- Class: Aves
- Order: Accipitriformes
- Family: Accipitridae
- Genus: Buteo
- Species: B. jamaicensis
- Subspecies: B. j. hadropus

Trinomial name
- Buteo jamaicensis hadropus Storer, 1962

Subspecies of bird

The Mexican Highlands red-tailed hawk (Buteo jamaicensis hadropus) is a subspecies of red-tailed hawk endemic to the Mexican Highlands. Not all authorities recognize this race, however, in recent years, most list it as valid. Like other Neotropical races, this one is relatively small. wing chord averages 378.9 mm (14.92 in) in males and 401.1 mm (15.79 in) in females. Males and females average 215 and 230.4 mm (8.46 and 9.07 in) in tail length, 89.1 and 88 mm (3.51 and 3.46 in) in tarsal length and 26.3 and 26.8 mm (1.04 and 1.06 in) in culmen length. Apparently, this race is similar to B. j. kemsiesi to the south but unlike that race it has rufous barring that extends to the flanks and belly. Apparently, some dark morphs have occurred. One other unique feature is its massive feet (as implied in the subspecies' scientific name), with a toe length nearly 10% longer than the western red-tailed hawk (B. j. calurus) despite its otherwise small body size. The evolutionary reason for these relatively large feet is unknown.
