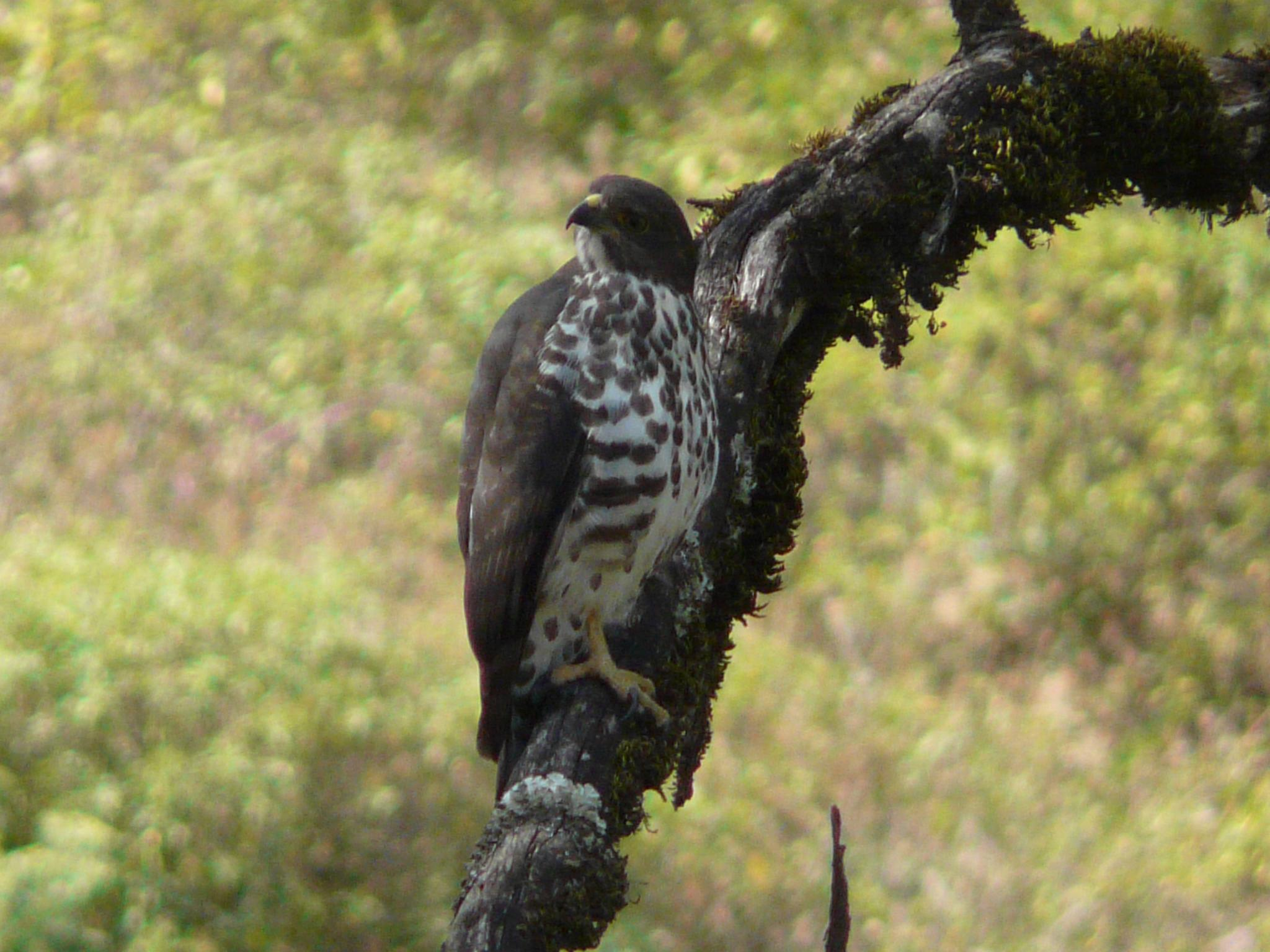
- In Ethiopia

Conservation status
- Near Threatened (IUCN 3.1)

Scientific classification
- Kingdom: Animalia
- Phylum: Chordata
- Class: Aves
- Order: Accipitriformes
- Family: Accipitridae
- Genus: Buteo
- Species: B. oreophilus

Binomial name
- Buteo oreophilus Hartert, EJO & Neumann, 1914

= Mountain buzzard =

Species of bird

The mountain buzzard (Buteo oreophilus) is a bird of prey that lives in montane forests in East Africa, it and the forest buzzard (Buteo trizonatus) of southern Africa were, until recently, considered to be a single species.

== Description ==
A small buzzard and quite similar to the steppe buzzard Buteo buteo vulpinus, the migratory subspecies of the Palearctic common buzzard which winters over most of Africa. The adult has brown upperparts with paler underparts with heavy brown blotches on the breast, belly, flanks and underwing coverts. The underside of the flight feathers is barred with a distinct black band along the rear edge of the wing. The tail is brown above, light grey below and shows faint narrow bars which are broadest just before the tail tip. Juveniles are buffier below and less heavily marked than the adults.

== Distribution ==
The mountain buzzard occurs in the mountainous regions of eastern Africa from Ethiopia, west through Kenya, Uganda, South Sudan and Rwanda to eastern Democratic Republic of Congo then south into Tanzania, Burundi and Malawi.

== Habitat ==
This species occurs in montane forest and fragments of montane forest, including plantations of exotic trees such as eucalyptus. In the southern part of its range, i.e. Malawi, it is restricted to montane rainforest and does not hunt in open habitats outside the forest.

== Habits ==
The mountain buzzard spends most of the day perched within the forest cover, but it can sometimes be seen soaring overhead. It is a territorial bird which is usually seen singly or in pairs. The main prey consists of small mammals, reptiles, and insects which are caught after the bird sights them from an open perch before gliding down and capturing them. In Uganda this species has been recorded hunting bats at caves.

Mountain buzzards construct a stick nests in the upper fork of tall forest trees. In East Africa nests with eggs have been reported from in January and March, while a nests with chicks have been reported in March, June and July. In Malawi there are no confirmed breeding records, but displaying pairs are most active in September and a juvenile has been seen in October.

== Taxonomy ==
The mountain buzzard and the forest buzzard are said to form a superspecies with the common buzzard and the Madagascar buzzard Buteo brachypterus, and may be also with the red-tailed hawk Buteo jamaicensis of North and South America and the rufous-tailed hawk Buteo ventralis of southern South America. The mountain buzzard has been classified as a subspecies of common buzzard, then split as a single species with the forest buzzard but nor these two are regarded as separate species.
