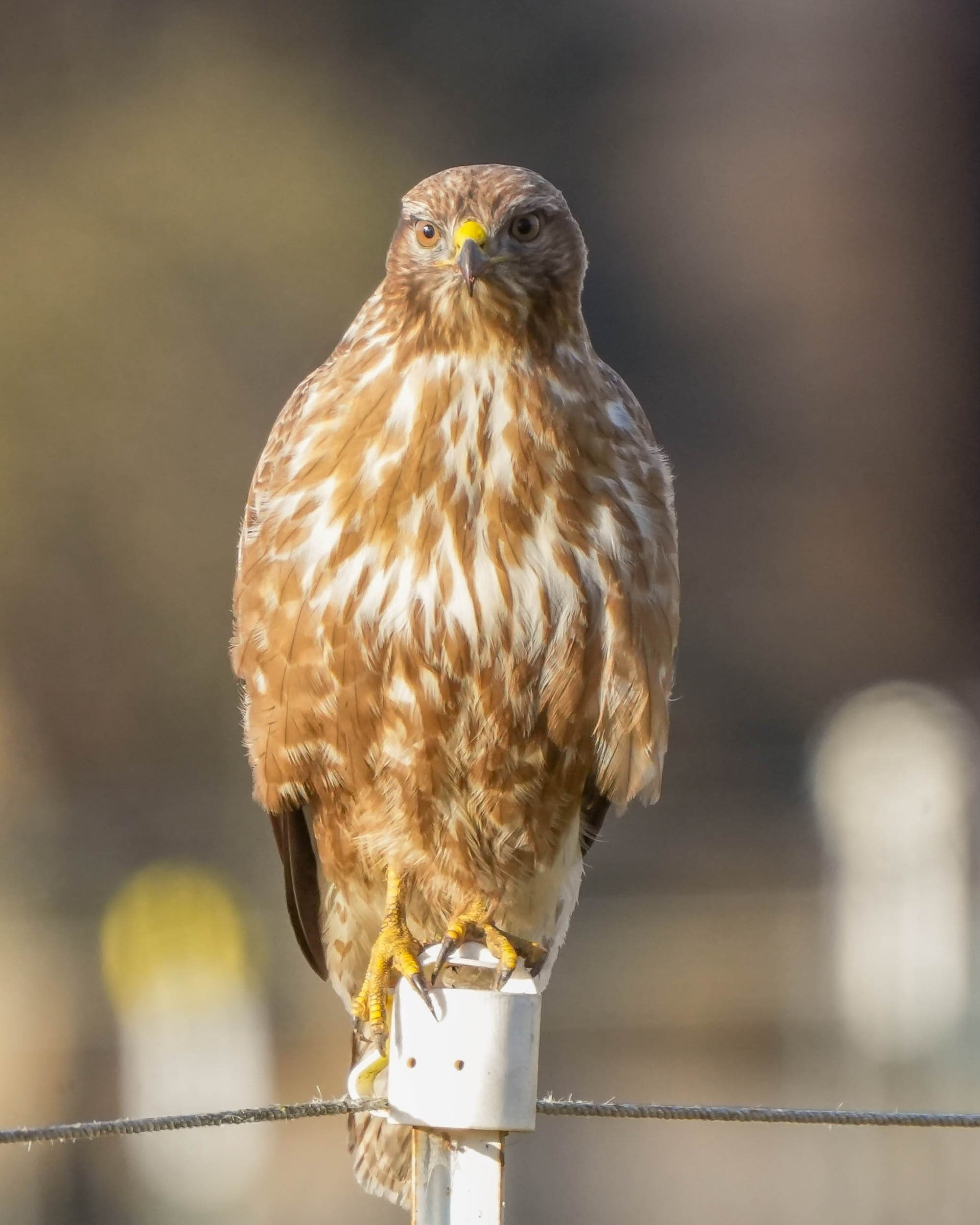
- Common buzzard (Buteo buteo)

Scientific classification
- Kingdom: Animalia
- Phylum: Chordata
- Class: Aves
- Order: Accipitriformes
- Family: Accipitridae
- Subfamily: Buteoninae
- Genus: Buteo; Lacépède, 1799

Type species
- Falco buteo Linnaeus, 1758

Species
- About 30, see text

Synonyms
- Asturina

= Buteo =

Buteo Temporal range: 33.9–0 Ma Oligocene – present

Genus of birds-of-prey including various buzzards and hawks

Buteo is a genus of medium to fairly large, wide-ranging raptors with a robust body and broad wings. In the Old World, members of this genus are called "buzzards", but "hawk" is used in the New World (Etymology: Buteo is the Latin name of the common buzzard). As both terms are ambiguous, buteo is sometimes used instead, for example, by the Peregrine Fund.

== Characteristics ==
Buteos are fairly large birds. Total length can vary from 30 to 75 cm (12 to 30 in) and wingspan can range from 67 to 170 cm (26 to 67 in). The lightest known species is the roadside hawk, (Note: The roadside hawk is now considered to be in a separate monotypic genus Rupornis (Kaup 1844)) at an average of 269 g (9.5 oz) although the lesser known white-rumped and Ridgway's hawks are similarly small in average wingspan around 75 cm (30 in), and average length around 35 cm (14 in) in standard measurements. The largest species in length and wingspan is the upland buzzard, which averages around 65 cm (26 in) in length and 152 cm (60 in) in wingspan. The upland is rivaled in weight and outsized in foot measurements and bill size by the ferruginous hawk. In both of these largest buteos, adults typically weigh over 1,200 g (2.6 lb), and in mature females, can exceed a mass of 2,000 g (4.4 lb). All buteos may be noted for their broad wings and sturdy builds. They frequently soar on thermals at midday over openings and are most frequently seen while doing this. The flight style varies based on the body type and wing shape and surface size. Some long-winged species, such as rough-legged buzzards and Swainson's hawks, have a floppy, buoyant flight style, while others, such as red-tailed hawks and rufous-tailed hawks, tend to be relatively shorter-winged, soaring more slowly and flying with more labored, deeper flaps. Most small and some medium-sized species, such as, red-shouldered hawk, often fly with an alternation of soaring and flapping, thus may be reminiscent of an Accipiter hawk in flight, but are still relatively larger-winged, shorter-tailed, and soar more extensively in open areas than Accipiter species do. Buteos inhabit a wide range of habitats across the world, but tend to prefer some access to both clearings, which provide ideal hunting grounds, and trees, which can provide nesting locations and security.

=== Diet ===
All Buteo species are to some extent opportunistic when it comes to hunting, and prey on almost any type of small animal as it becomes available to them. However, most have a strong preference for small mammals, mostly rodents. Rodents of almost every family in the world are somewhere preyed upon by Buteo species. Since many rodents are primarily nocturnal, most buteos mainly hunt rodents that may be partially active during the day, which can include squirrels and chipmunks, voles, and gerbils. More nocturnal varieties are hunted opportunistically and may be caught in the first or last few hours of light. Other smallish mammals, such as shrews, moles, pikas, bats, and weasels, tend to be minor secondary prey, although can locally be significant for individual species. Larger mammals, such as rabbits, hares, and marmots, including even adult specimens weighing as much as 2 to 3 kg (4.4 to 6.6 lb), may be hunted by the heaviest and strongest species, such as ferruginous, red-tailed and white-tailed hawks. Birds are taken occasionally, as well. Small to mid-sized birds, i.e. passerines, woodpeckers, waterfowl, pigeons, and gamebirds, are most often taken. However, since the adults of most smaller birds can successfully outmaneuver and evade buteos in flight, much avian prey is taken in the nestling or fledgling stages or adult birds if they are previously injured. An exception is the short-tailed hawk, which is a relatively small and agile species and is locally a small bird-hunting specialist. The Hawaiian hawk, which evolved on an isolated group of islands with no terrestrial mammals, was also initially a bird specialist, although today it preys mainly on introduced rodents. Other prey may include snakes, lizards, frogs, salamanders, fish, and even various invertebrates, especially beetles. In several Buteo species found in more tropical regions, such as the grey-lined hawk, reptiles and amphibians may come to locally dominate the diet. Swainson's hawk, despite its somewhat large size, is something of exceptional insect-feeding specialist and may rely almost fully on crickets and dragonflies when wintering in southern South America. Carrion is eaten occasionally by most species, but is almost always secondary to live prey. The importance of carrion in the Old World "buzzard" species is relatively higher since these often seem slower and less active predators than their equivalents in the Americas. Most Buteo species seem to prefer to ambush prey by pouncing down to the ground directly from a perch. In a secondary approach, many spot prey from a great distance while soaring and circle down to the ground to snatch it.

=== Reproduction ===
Buteos are typical accipitrids in most of their breeding behaviors. They all build their own nests, which are often constructed out of sticks and other materials they can carry. Nests are generally located in trees, which are generally selected based on large sizes and inaccessibility to climbing predators rather than by species. Most Buteos breed in stable pairs, which may mate for life or at least for several years even in migratory species in which pairs part ways during winter. Generally from 2 to 4 eggs are laid by the female and are mostly incubated by her, while the male mate provides food. Once the eggs hatch, the survival of the young is dependent upon how abundant appropriate food is and the security of the nesting location from potential nest predators and other (often human-induced) disturbances. As in many raptors, the nestlings hatch at intervals of a day or two and the older, strong siblings tend to have the best chances of survival, with the younger siblings often starving or being handled aggressively (and even killed) by their older siblings. The male generally does most of the hunting and the female broods, but the male may also do some brooding while the female hunts as well. Once the fledgling stage is reached, the female takes over much of the hunting. After a stage averaging a couple of weeks, the fledglings take the adults' increasing indifference to feeding them or occasional hostile behavior towards them as a cue to disperse on their own. Generally, young Buteos tend to disperse several miles away from their nesting grounds and wander for one to two years until they can court a mate and establish their own breeding range.

=== Distribution ===
The Buteo hawks include many of the most widely distributed, most common, and best-known raptors in the world. Examples include the red-tailed hawk of North America and the common buzzard of Eurasia. Most Northern Hemisphere species are at least partially migratory. In North America, species such as broad-winged hawks and Swainson's hawks are known for their huge numbers (often called "kettles") while passing over major migratory flyways in the fall. Up to tens of thousands of these Buteos can be seen each day during the peak of their migration. Any of the prior mentioned common Buteo species may have total populations that exceed a million individuals. On the other hand, the Socotra buzzard and Galapagos hawks are considered vulnerable to extinction per the IUCN. Ridgway's hawk is even more direly threatened and is considered Critically Endangered. These insular forms are threatened primarily by habitat destruction, prey reductions and poisoning. The latter reason is considered the main cause of a noted decline in the population of the more abundant Swainson's hawk, due to insecticides being used in southern South America, which the hawks ingest through crickets and then die from poisoning.

== Taxonomy and systematics ==
The genus Buteo was erected by the French naturalist Bernard Germain de Lacépède in 1799 by tautonymy with the specific name of the common buzzard Falco buteo which had been introduced by Carl Linnaeus in 1758.

=== Extant species in taxonomic order ===
Genus Buteo – Lacépède, 1799 – twenty eight species
Common name	Scientific name and subspecies	Range	Size and ecology	IUCN status and estimated population
Common buzzard	Buteo buteo (Linnaeus, 1758) Six subspecies: B. b. buteo; B. b. harterti; B. b. insularum; B. b. menetriesi; B. b. pojana; B. b. vulpinus	northwestern China (Tian Shan), far western Siberia and northwestern Mongolia.	Size: Habitat: Diet:	LC
Eastern buzzard	Buteo japonicus (Temminck & Schlegel, 1844) Four subspecies: B. j. burmanicus - Hume, 1875; B. j. japonicus - Temminck & Schlegel, 1845; B. j. toyoshimai - Momiyama, 1927; B. j. oshiroi - Kuroda, Nagahisa, 1971	East Asia and some parts of Russia and South Asia	Size: Habitat: Diet:	LC
Himalayan buzzard	Buteo refectus Portenko, 1935	The Himalayas in Nepal, India and southern China.	Size: Habitat: Diet:	LC
Cape Verde buzzard	Buteo bannermani (Swann, 1919)	Cape Verde	Size: Habitat: Diet:	
Socotra buzzard	Buteo socotraensis Porter & Kirwan, 2010	Socotra, Yemen	Size: Habitat: Diet:	VU
Red-tailed hawk	Buteo jamaicensis (Gmelin, 1788) Fourteen subspecies: Jamaican red-tailed hawk (B. j. jamaicensis); Alaska red-tailed hawk (B. j. alascensis); Eastern red-tailed hawk (B. j. borealis); Western red-tailed hawk (B. j. calurus); Central American red-tailed hawk (B. j. costaricensis); Southwestern red-tailed hawk (B. j. fuertesi); Tres Marias red-tailed hawk (B. j. fumosus); Mexican Highlands red-tailed hawk (B. j. hadropus); Harlan's hawk (B. j. harlani); Red-tailed hawk (kemsiesi) (B. j. kemsiesi); Krider's hawk (B. j. kriderii); Socorro red-tailed hawk (B. j. socorroensis); Cuban red-tailed hawk (B. j. solitudinis); Florida red-tailed hawk (B. j. umbrinus)	Alaska and northern Canada to as far south as Panama and the West Indies.	Size: Habitat: Diet:	LC
Long-legged buzzard	Buteo rufinus (Cretzschmar, 1829) Two subspecies: B. r. rufinus - (Cretzschmar, 1829); B. r. cirtensis - (Levaillant, J, 1850)	Southeastern Europe down to East Africa to the northern part of the Indian subcontinent.	Size: Habitat: Diet:	LC
Rough-legged buzzard	Buteo lagopus (Pontoppidan, 1763) Four subspecies: B. l. lagopus - (Pontoppidan, 1763); B. l. menzbieri - Dementiev, 1951; B. l. kamtschatkensis - Dementiev, 1931; B. l. sanctijohannis - (Gmelin, JF, 1788)	Arctic and Subarctic regions of North America, Europe, and Russia	Size: Habitat: Diet:	LC
Ferruginous hawk	Buteo regalis (Gray, 1844)	North America	Size: Habitat: Diet:	LC
Red-shouldered hawk	Buteo lineatus (Gmelin, 1788) Five subspecies: B. l. lineatus (Gmelin, 1788); B. l. alleni Ridgway, 1885; B. l. extimus Bangs, 1920; B. l. texanus Bishop, 1912; B. l. elegans Cassin, 1855	Eastern North America and along the coast of California and northern to northeastern-central Mexico.	Size: Habitat: Diet:	LC
Broad-winged hawk	Buteo platypterus (Vieillot, 1823) Six subspecies: B. p. platypterus – (Vieillot, 1823); B. p. brunnescens – Danforth & Smyth, 1935; B. p. cubanensis – Burns, 1911; B. p. insulicola – Riley, 1908; B. p. rivierei – Verrill, AH, 1905; B. p. antillarum – Clark, AH, 1905	Eastern North America, as far west as British Columbia and Texas, Neotropics from Mexico south to southern Brazil	Size: Habitat: Diet:	LC
Swainson's hawk	Buteo swainsoni Bonaparte, 1838	Western North America, Chile, Argentina, Dominican Republic, and Trinidad and Tobago, and in Norway.	Size: Habitat: Diet:	LC
Ridgway's hawk	Buteo ridgwayi (Cory, 1883)	Hispaniola	Size: Habitat: Diet:	CR
Short-tailed hawk	Buteo brachyurus (Vieillot, 1816) Two subspecies: B. b. fuliginosus - Sclater, PL, 1858; B. b. brachyurus - Vieillot, 1816	From southeastern Brazil and northern Argentina north through Central America to the mountains of the Mexico-Arizona border area, as well as in southern Florida, United States	Size: Habitat: Diet:	LC
White-throated hawk	Buteo albigula Philippi, 1899	South America	Size: Habitat: Diet:	LC
Galapagos hawk	Buteo galapagoensis (Gould, 1837)	Galápagos Islands	Size: Habitat: Diet:	VU
Gray-lined hawk	Buteo nitidus Latham, 1790 Three subspecies: B. n. blakei - Hellmayr & Conover, 1949; B. n. nitidus - (Latham, 1790); B. n. pallidus - (Todd, 1915)	El Salvador to Argentina, as well as on the Caribbean island of Trinidad.	Size: Habitat: Diet:	LC
Gray hawk	Buteo plagiatus (Schlegel, 1862)	From Costa Rica north into the southwestern United States	Size: Habitat: Diet:	LC
Zone-tailed hawk	Buteo albonotatus (Kaup, 1847)	Southern Arizona, New Mexico, and western Texas almost throughout inland Mexico and the central portions of Central America down into eastern Colombia, Ecuador, and Peru, southern Brazil, Paraguay, Bolivia, and northern Argentina.	Size: Habitat: Diet:	LC
Hawaiian hawk	Buteo solitarius (Peale, 1848)	Hawaii	Size: Habitat: Diet:	NT
Rufous-tailed hawk	Buteo ventralis Gould, 1837	Argentina, Chile	Size: Habitat: Diet:	VU
Mountain buzzard	Buteo oreophilus Hartert and Neumann, 1914	East Africa	Size: Habitat: Diet:	NT
Forest buzzard	Buteo trizonatus Rudebeck, 1957	South Africa, Lesotho and Eswatini	Size: Habitat: Diet:	NT
Madagascar buzzard	Buteo brachypterus Hartlaub, 1860	Madagascar	Size: Habitat: Diet:	LC
Upland buzzard	Buteo hemilasius Temminck & Schlegel, 1844	Central and East Asia	Size: Habitat: Diet:	LC
Red-necked buzzard	Buteo auguralis Salvadori, 1865	The Sahel and Central Africa	Size: Habitat: Diet:	LC
Jackal buzzard	Buteo rufofuscus (Forster, 1798)	Southern Africa	Size: Habitat: Diet:	LC
Augur buzzard	Buteo augur (Rüppell, 1836) Two subspecies: B. a. augur (Rüppell, 1836); B. a. archeri Sclater, WL, 1918	From Ethiopia to southern Angola and central Namibia.	Size: Habitat: Diet:	LC

=== Fossil record ===
A number of fossil species have been discovered, mainly in North America. Some are placed here primarily based on considerations of biogeography, Buteo being somewhat hard to distinguish from Geranoaetus based on osteology alone:

- †Buteo dondasi (Late Pliocene of Buenos Aires, Argentina)
- †Buteo fluviaticus (Brule Middle? Oligocene of Wealt County, US) – possibly same as B. grangeri
- †Buteo grangeri (Brule Middle? Oligocene of Washabaugh County, South Dakota, US)
- †Buteo antecursor (Brule Late? Oligocene)
- †?Buteo sp. (Brule Late Oligocene of Washington County, US)
- †Buteo ales (Agate Fossil Beds Early Miocene of Sioux County, US) – formerly in Geranospiza or Geranoaetus
- †Buteo typhoius (Olcott Early ?- snake Creek Late Miocene of Sioux County, US)
- †Buteo pusillus (Middle Miocene of Grive-Saint-Alban, France)
- †Buteo sp. (Middle Miocene of Grive-Saint-Alban, France – Early Pleistocene of Bacton, England)
- †Buteo contortus (snake Creek Late Miocene of Sioux County, US) – formerly in Geranoaetus
- †Buteo spassovi (Late Miocene of Chadžidimovo, Bulgaria)
- †Buteo conterminus (snake Creek Late Miocene/Early Pliocene of Sioux County, US) – formerly in Geranoaetus
- †Buteo sp. (Late Miocene/Early Pliocene of Lee Creek Mine, North Carolina, US)
- †Buteo sanya (Late Pleistocene of Luobidang Cave, Hainan, China)
- †Buteo chimborazoensis (Late Pleistocene of Ecuador)
- †Buteo sanfelipensis (Late Pleistocene, Cuba)

An unidentifiable accipitrid that occurred on Ibiza in the Late Pliocene/Early Pleistocene may also have been a Buteo. If this is so, the bird can be expected to aid in untangling the complicated evolutionary history of the common buzzard group.

The prehistoric species "Aquila" danana, Buteogallus fragilis (Fragile eagle), and Spizaetus grinnelli were at one time also placed in Buteo.
