= Buteo chimborazoensis =

Buteo chimborazoensis Temporal range: Pleistocene

Scientific classification
- Kingdom: Animalia
- Phylum: Chordata
- Class: Aves
- Order: Accipitriformes
- Family: Accipitridae
- Genus: Buteo
- Species: †B. chimborazoensis

Binomial name
- †Buteo chimborazoensis Lo Coco et al., 2024

Extinct species of bird

Buteo chimborazoensis is an extinct species of the genus Buteo that lived in Ecuador during the Pleistocene epoch.
