= Buteo sanya =

Buteo sanya Temporal range: Late Pleistocene

Scientific classification
- Kingdom: Animalia
- Phylum: Chordata
- Class: Aves
- Order: Accipitriformes
- Family: Accipitridae
- Genus: Buteo
- Species: †B. sanya

Binomial name
- †Buteo sanya Hou, 1998

Extinct species of bird

Buteo sanya is an extinct species of Buteo that went extinct in the Late Pleistocene epoch. Fossils for this species have been found in the Luobidang Cave site in Hainan, China.
