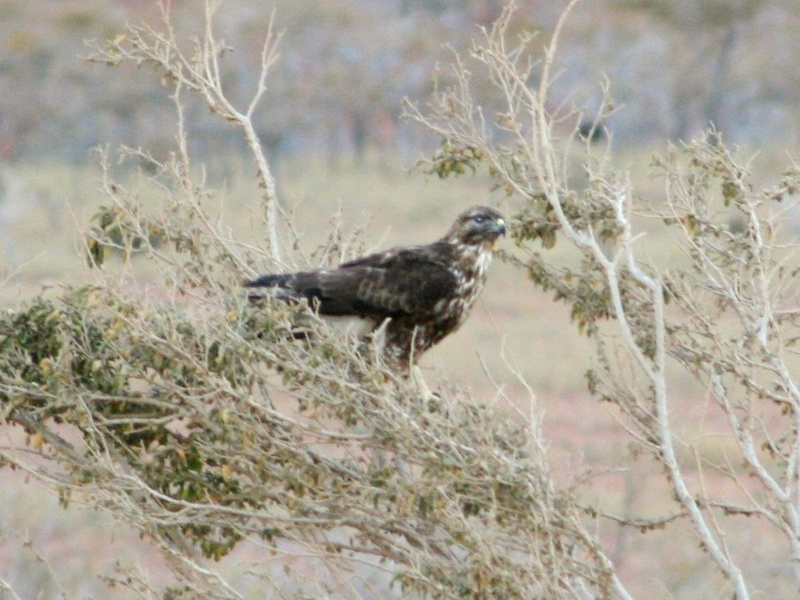

Conservation status
- Vulnerable (IUCN 3.1)

Scientific classification
- Kingdom: Animalia
- Phylum: Chordata
- Class: Aves
- Order: Accipitriformes
- Family: Accipitridae
- Genus: Buteo
- Species: B. socotraensis

Binomial name
- Buteo socotraensis Porter & Kirwan, 2010
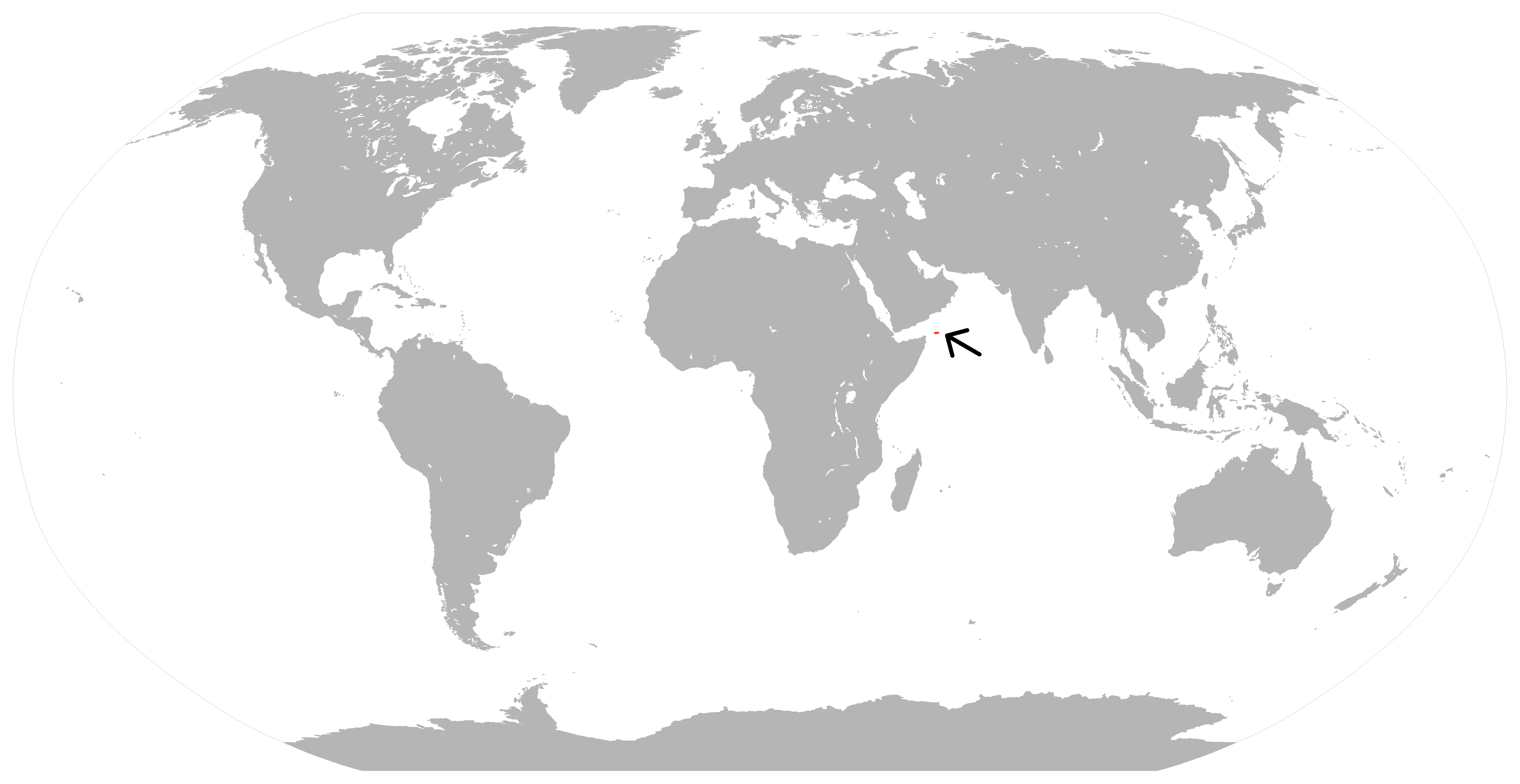

= Socotra buzzard =

Species of bird

The Socotra buzzard (Buteo socotraensis) is a medium to large bird of prey that is sometimes considered a subspecies of the widespread common buzzard (Buteo buteo). As its name implies, it is native to the island of Socotra, Yemen. It is listed as Vulnerable on the IUCN Red List, as its small population (250 – 500 mature individuals as of 2022) is believed to be decreasing.

== Description ==
The Socotra buzzard measures 45 cm in length. Adults typically have yellow-white abdomen and breast. They display fine brown streaking on their throat and breast, with the streaking being heavier on breast, abdomen, flanks, and thighs. Certain individuals display a white throat and upper breast. The species exhibits short, compact wings with a length of approximately 358 mm, a tail length of 188.5 mm, and a tarsus length of 65.19 mm. There is little difference in plumage between adults and juveniles, the main difference being in the intensity of the streaking on the underparts

== Taxonomy ==
Although the buzzard has been known for more than 110 years, it wasn't recognized as a species until 2010. Prior to that, it was assumed to be the same species as B. buteo. There has been much debate about the taxonomic position of the Socotra buzzard. It is genetically closest to the taxa B. rufinus and B. bannermani, but its plumage is most similar to B. trizonatus and B. oreophilus.

== Habitat and Distribution ==
Buteo socotraensis is found only on the island of Socotra, Yemen. It inhabits the foothills and plateaus of the island, as well as terrain with deep ravines. It is usually found at altitudes between 150–800 m. It requires cliffs to nest, and is not dependent on trees. It has been suggested that it may compete for nesting habitat with vultures, ravens, and falcons. Population surveys indicate that there are fewer than 500 individuals on the island.

== Behaviour ==
=== Voice ===
Because only one sonogram has been recorded of B. socotraensis, this behavioural trait has not been considered with regard to its taxonomy. Its call is very similar to other species of the same genus, namely Buteo rufinus, B. buteo, and B. oreophilus . A key identifying characteristic of the species' call is the short period (<1 second) between calls. Its call has a frequency of 2.2 kHz, a similar but different frequency to other species in the same taxon.

=== Diet ===
The island of Socotra has few mammals, making the buzzard's diet consist mainly of reptiles and invertebrates. Its opportunistic hunting style makes it unlikely that it hunts other bird species.

=== Reproduction ===
Aerial tumbling and talon grappling have been observed as behaviour during the breeding season, which usually occurs in September–April, with egg-laying in September–January. The buzzards build nests on cliffs and in crevices, and their broods range from 1-3 nestlings. Both the male and female tend the young and remain present during the post-fledging period. Nests have been found at altitudes of 150-650m, in shaded areas to protect them from the sun during the day.
