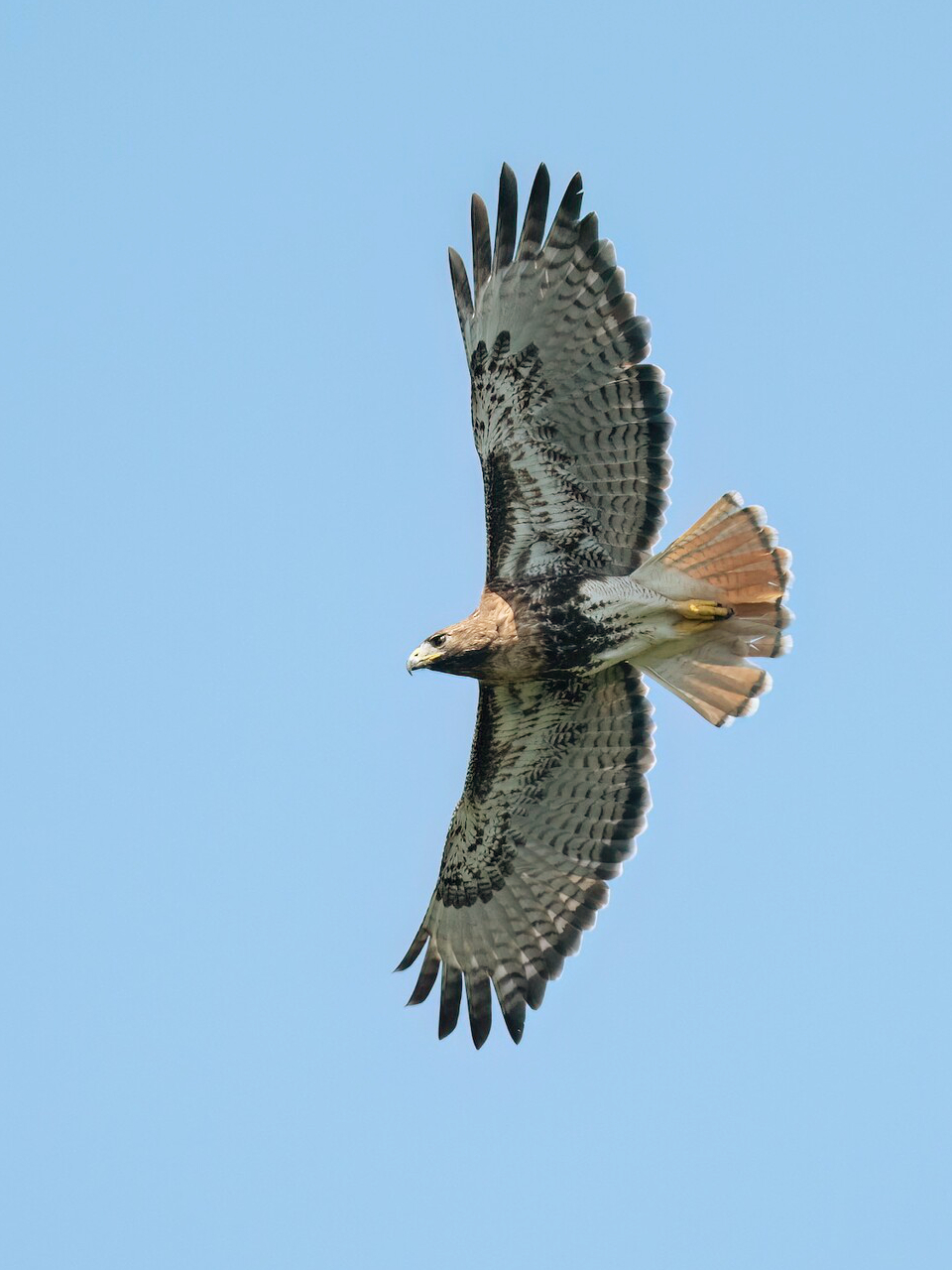
- Buteo jamaicensis jamaicensis in flight, Puerto Rico

Scientific classification
- Kingdom: Animalia
- Phylum: Chordata
- Class: Aves
- Order: Accipitriformes
- Family: Accipitridae
- Genus: Buteo
- Species: B. jamaicensis
- Subspecies: B. j. jamaicensis

Trinomial name
- Buteo jamaicensis jamaicensis (Gmelin, 1788)

= Jamaican red-tailed hawk =

Subspecies of bird

The Jamaican red-tailed hawk (Buteo jamaicensis jamaicensis) is the nominate subspecies of the red-tailed hawk (Buteo jamaicensis), a bird of prey of North America. The subspecies B. j. jamaicensis occurs in the northern West Indies, including Jamaica, Hispaniola, Puerto Rico and the Lesser Antilles, but not the Bahamas or Cuba, where it is replaced by the Cuban red-tailed hawk (B. j. solitudinis). El Yunque National Forest, Puerto Rico, holds some of the highest known density of Jamaican red-tailed hawks. The bird is referred to as a guaraguao (a Taino term) in the Dominican Republic and Puerto Rico.

== Description ==
This is the smallest-bodied subspecies of the red-tailed hawk. In males, the wing chord can range from 330 to 339 mm (13.0 to 13.3 in), averaging 334.9 mm (13.19 in), and, in females, it ranges from 350 to 371 mm (13.8 to 14.6 in), averaging 364.9 mm (14.37 in). Additionally, males and females average 194.8 and 210 mm (7.67 and 8.27 in) in tail length, 81.3 and 83.4 mm (3.20 and 3.28 in) in tarsal length and 26.1 and 28.2 mm (1.03 and 1.11 in) in culmen length. In terms of body mass, two Puerto Rican males were found to average 795 g (1.753 lb) and two females averaged 1,023 g (2.255 lb). Although claimed as the most sexually dimorphic subspecies by size, neither body mass nor linear dimensions seem to support this. This subspecies has less mottling than northern red-tails on the back, lacks the white tip at the end of the rectrices and, most characteristically, has a very broad, but raggedly edged, black belly band.
