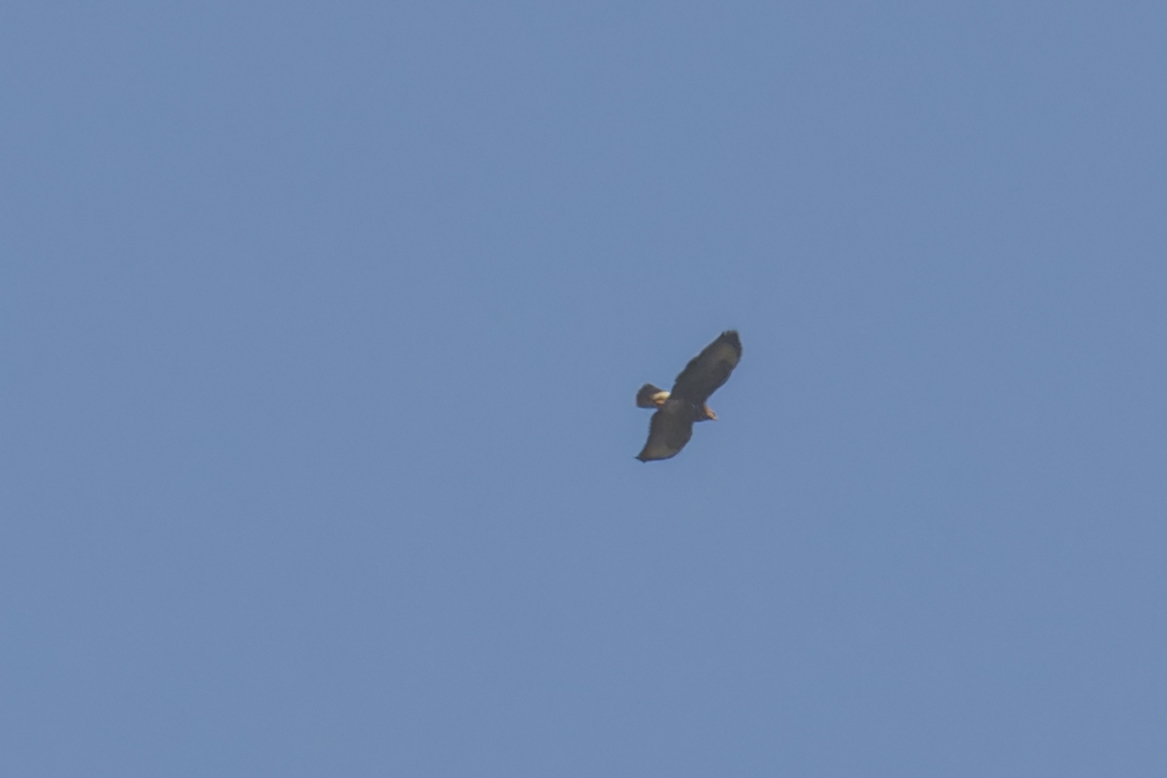

Scientific classification
- Kingdom: Animalia
- Phylum: Chordata
- Class: Aves
- Order: Accipitriformes
- Family: Accipitridae
- Genus: Buteo
- Species: B. bannermani

Binomial name
- Buteo bannermani Swann, 1919

Synonyms
- Buteo buteo bannermani

= Cape Verde buzzard =

Species of bird

The Cape Verde buzzard (Buteo bannermani) is a medium to large bird of prey that is sometimes considered a subspecies of the widespread common buzzard (Buteo buteo). As its name implies, it is native to Cape Verde. Some taxonomists consider it a distinct species.

== See also ==
- List of birds of Cape Verde
