= Harry Kirke Swann =

English ornithologist and author

Harry Kirke Swann (18 March 1871 near Ewhurst, Surrey – 14 April 1926, Barnet, London) was an English ornithologist and author of books on birds. His research interests were birds of prey and British avifauna.

== Biography ==
Swann was initially privately taught. He then attended Roan School in Greenwich, London, and finally had a private tutor in Brighton. His interest in nature and especially in ornithology was awakened in his earliest childhood. At the age of 20, he traveled to the eastern Canadian province of Nova Scotia and in 1895 published an account of his Canadian travels under the title Nature in Acadie in 1895. After returning to England in 1892, he founded the journal The Naturalist's Journal: A Monthly Medium for Collectors and Students, which under the editorship of Seth Lister Mosley (1848-1929) was renamed in 1896 The Naturalist's Journal, and Naturalist's Guide. In this journal, in 1892, Swann's first article, Bird Life on Epsom Common, was published. In 1893 he published the work Birds of London, in which he describes his seven-year ornithological fieldwork in the London District. In 1896 followed A Concise Handbook of British Birds. In the same year he was editor of the fifth edition of Francis Orpen Morris's History of British Birds (a standard reference work), and he oversaw the reissue of Henry Seebohm's British Birds. In the spring of 1896 Swann founded the journal The Ornithologist, which was disestablished after publishing one volume.

In 1904 he joined the publishing house Messrs. John Wheldon & Co., which specialized in natural history works and merged in 1921 with the publishing house William Wesley & Sons. During this time, Swann acquired extensive ornithological and bibliographic knowledge. In 1913 Messrs. Witherby and Company published Swann's A Dictionary of English and Folk Names of British Birds. In 1917 he published, together with Major William Herbert Mullens (1866-1946), A Bibliography of British Ornithology , which included biographical accounts of the principal British ornithologists along with bibliographies of their published works. In 1920 Swann became a member of the British Ornithologists' Union.

Swann married in 1906; the marriage produced five children. He died on April 14, 1926, aged 55, as a result of surgery at the Barnet Cottage Hospital in London.

In 1930 Alexander Wetmore published posthumously the book A Monograph of the Birds of Prey (Order Accipitres), begun by Swann, which is one of the most outstanding standard works on birds of prey in the first half of the 20th century.

Among the species described by Swann are Buckley's forest-falcon (Micrastur buckleyi Swann, 1919), the Cape Verde buzzard (1919) and the white-collared kite (1922). He further described sub-species of the African cuckoo-hawk (Aviceda cuculoides batesi, 1920), the collared falconet (Microhierax caerulescens burmanicus, 1920) and the gray-lined hawk (Buteo nitidus costaricensis, 1922).

== Bibliography ==
- Swann, H. Kirke (1893). The birds of London. London: Sonnenschein.
