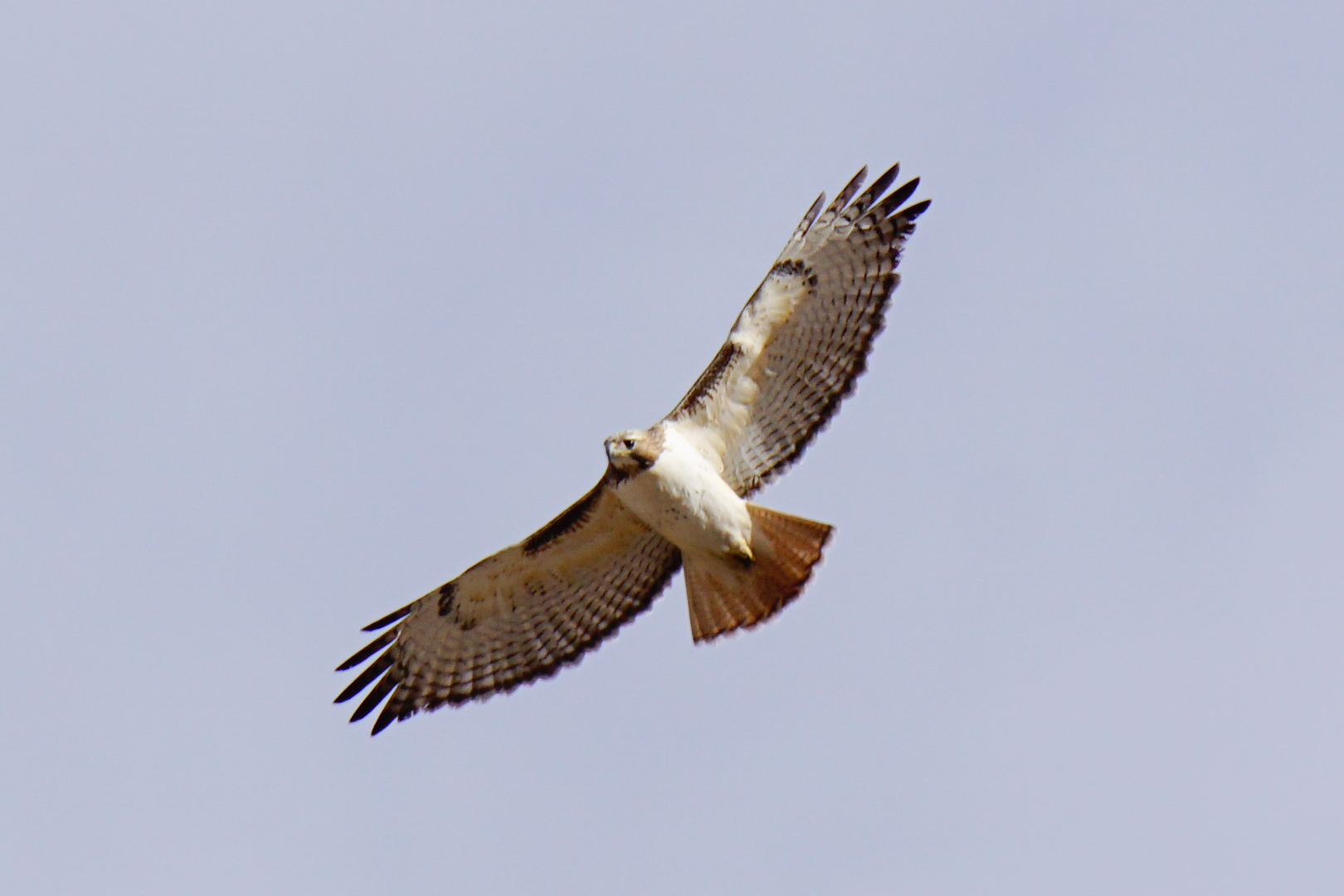

Scientific classification
- Domain: Eukaryota
- Kingdom: Animalia
- Phylum: Chordata
- Class: Aves
- Order: Accipitriformes
- Family: Accipitridae
- Genus: Buteo
- Species: B. jamaicensis
- Subspecies: B. j. borealis

Trinomial name
- Buteo jamaicensis borealis (Gmelin, 1788)

= Eastern red-tailed hawk =

Subspecies of bird

The eastern red-tailed hawk (Buteo jamaicensis borealis) is a subspecies of the red-tailed hawk that breeds from southeast Canada and Maine south through Texas and east to northern Florida.

== Range ==
The race breeds below the Arctic (unlike more western birds which can reach the sub-Arctic as breeders), and is absent from all but the southernmost part of the Hudson Bay and roughly the northern third of both Quebec and Newfoundland. Wintering migrants from southern Ontario may range east to southern Maine and south to as far as the Gulf Coast and Florida. The western limits of this race's range are slightly ambiguous and they may hybridize extensively with the western red-tailed hawk (Buteo jamaicensis calurus) in timbered stretches of the Great Plains. The breeding range of B. j. borealis seems to include most of Texas (perhaps excluding the western sections), Oklahoma, Kansas and Nebraska. In the Dakotas and even eastern Wyoming, some B. j. borealis may occur but give way mostly to B. j. calurus and/or Krider's hawk (B. j. kriderii), with the B. j. borealis type hawks breeding without race mixing to the western border of Minnesota and the eastern third of Manitoba.

== Description ==
This is a large-bodied, relatively heavy race, but differs from more westerly hawks in having a relatively smaller wing area. Based on linear dimensions, this subspecies shows the most size variation and, unlike the red-tailed hawk species overall, size variation seems to fall within Bergmann's rule as northern birds average larger than southern ones. The wing chord of males can range from 337 to 396 mm (13.3 to 15.6 in), averaging 370.1 mm (14.57 in), and, in females, it ranges from 370 to 427 mm (14.6 to 16.8 in), averaging 390.2 mm (15.36 in). Additionally, males and females average 215.4 and 230.1 mm (8.48 and 9.06 in) in tail length, 82.4 and 85 mm (3.24 and 3.35 in) in tarsal length and 25.1 and 27.6 mm (0.99 and 1.09 in) in culmen length. The largest known sample of body weights from unambiguous B. j. borealis was from Wisconsin migrants, with 34 males averaging 945.3 g (2.084 lb) and 24 females averaging 1,222.4 g (2.695 lb). This race only has pale morphs and almost always bears a whitish ground color with little barring overall, including a variably present dark necklace, a frequently absent or much reduced belly band and little to no barring on the flanks or the upper legs. Immature B. j. borealis tend to have dark spotting on leg feathers but otherwise average paler than immatures of most other races. This race includes a form from the northern stretches of its range (mostly breeding within Canada), formerly considered as B. j. abieticola. Birds of B. j. abieticola type are more heavily marked below than typical B. j. borealis and, thus B. j. borealis seem to correspond to Gloger's rule, as well. This plumage variation appears to be a regional adaptation to the denser boreal forest.
