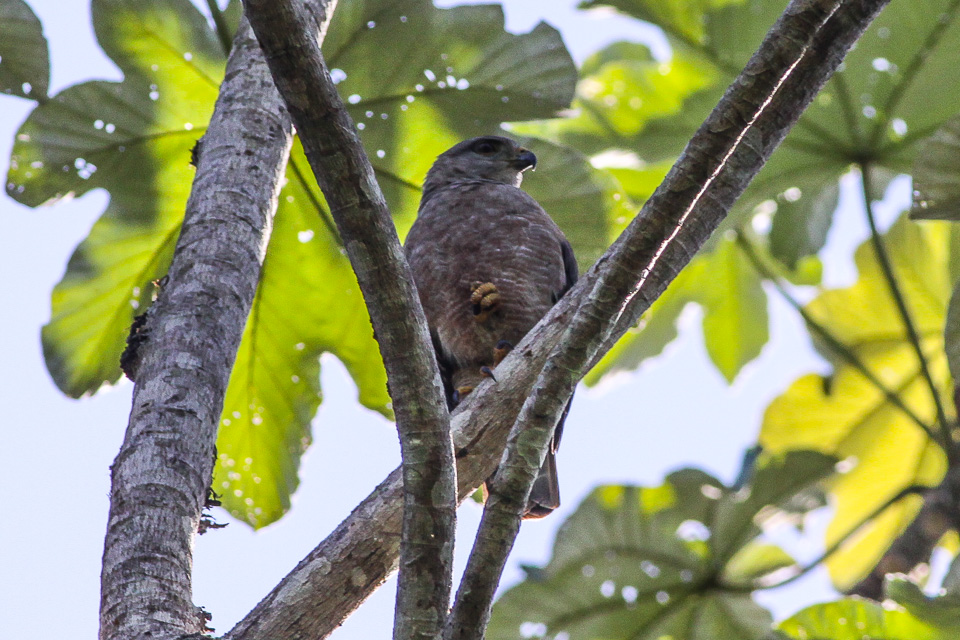
- In Los Haitises National Park, Dominican Republic

Conservation status
- Critically Endangered (IUCN 3.1)

Scientific classification
- Kingdom: Animalia
- Phylum: Chordata
- Class: Aves
- Order: Accipitriformes
- Family: Accipitridae
- Genus: Buteo
- Species: B. ridgwayi

Binomial name
- Buteo ridgwayi (Cory, 1883)
- Range in green

Synonyms
- Rupornis ridgwayi

= Ridgway's hawk =

Species of hawk endemic to Hispaniola

Ridgway's hawk (Buteo ridgwayi) is a bird of prey in the family Accipitridae endemic to the island of Hispaniola (both Haiti and the Dominican Republic) in the Caribbean. It is classified as Critically Endangered because of habitat destruction and human persecution in the Dominican Republic; however, due to conservation efforts, the population is now increasing.

It is named in honour of the ornithologist Robert Ridgway.

== Description ==
B. ridgwayi is a medium-sized, compact hawk, measuring 36–41 cm long. The adult has brown-grey upperparts and greyish barred underparts, with a reddish-brown wash, rufous-tinged thighs, and a black-and-white barred tail. The male is more grey than the female, and the legs and the base of bill are yellow.

== Diet and breeding ==
Ridgway's hawk is an apex predator on Hispaniola, feeding on rodents, bats, centipedes, birds, anoles, skinks, frogs, and snakes. It nests in the crowns of tall trees, such as Roystonea borinquena, with nest-building in December through June, and egg-laying in January to June. The clutch size is 1 to 3 eggs. Most pairs raise 1 to 2 young, though 3 have been reported.

== Distribution ==
Ridgway's hawk's original breeding range included all of the island of Hispaniola and some of the adjacent isles and keys, such as Gonâve Island, Île-à-Vache, Tortuga, Beata Island, and Alto Velo Island. However, it has since been extirpated from a large area of the Dominican Republic and almost all of Haiti, due to extensive deforestation and loss of habitat there. It was thought to be completely extirpated from all of Haiti; however, recent expeditions to the islands of Les Cayemites discovered a breeding population there. In the Dominican Republic, the only known surviving populations outside of reintroductions is in and around Los Haitises National Park, and a relict population in the Samaná Peninsula.

== Conservation ==
This bird is described as critically endangered, due to clearance of its forest habitat and persecution by local farmers, who claim that the species preys upon their domestic fowl. Conservationists have countered that poultry is nothing more than a minor element of their diet, and that the Ridgway's hawk has a highly varied prey base, with reptiles comprising up to 90% of its diet. Electrocution from power poles and nestling parasitism by Philornis pici flies are also reasons for population decline. Reintroductions in the Ecological Center of the Puntacana Resort and Club in La Altagracia Province have proven extremely successful; 25 individuals were also released in Aniana Vargas National Park in Sánchez Ramírez Province, with more releases planned. It is proposed that a "Ridgway's Hawk Day" should become a national holiday in the Dominican Republic, in order for the species to become more publicly known and protected.
