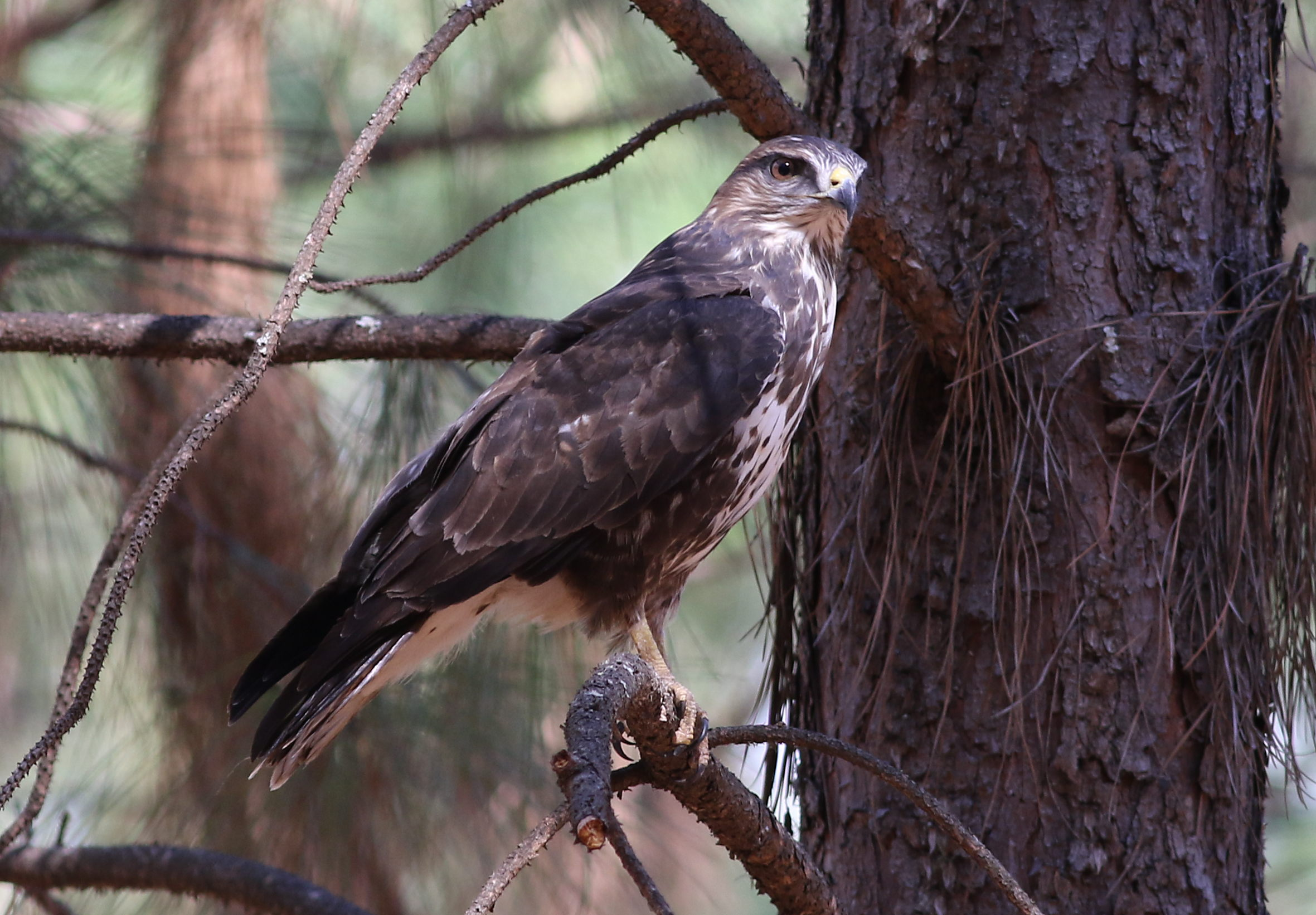

Conservation status
- Near Threatened (IUCN 3.1)

Scientific classification
- Kingdom: Animalia
- Phylum: Chordata
- Class: Aves
- Order: Accipitriformes
- Family: Accipitridae
- Genus: Buteo
- Species: B. trizonatus

Binomial name
- Buteo trizonatus Rudebeck, 1957

= Forest buzzard =

Species of bird

The forest buzzard (Buteo trizonatus) is a species of bird of prey found in Africa, though some authorities have placed it as a subspecies of another species, the mountain buzzard, Buteo oreophilus. This is a resident breeding species in woodlands in southern and eastern South Africa.

== Description ==
The forest buzzard is very similar to the abundant summer migrant steppe buzzard Buteo buteo vulpinus, the head, the back and upperwings are brown, marked out with rufous edges to the feathers the amount of which varies between individuals. The chin is whitish and unmarked, the breast and belly are whitish but marked with a variable amount of brown spots, and the undertail coverts are plain whitish. There is variation and some adults show brown barring along the breast sides and the belly while all but the palest birds show a distinctive white 'U' mark in the middle of the otherwise blotched abdomen. The underwings are white, with a reddish-brown tinge on the lesser underwing coverts and a dark comma shaped mark at the tip of primary coverts . The plumage on the thighs are uniformly reddish-brown, and the axillary feathers are white with brown barring. The upper tail is brown, washed with reddish-brown and the tail has some narrow dark brown bands with a broad dark brown subterminal band while the undertail bands can be indistinct. The body length is 41–48 cm (16–19 in) and the wingspan is 102–117 cm (40–46 in).

== Distribution and movements ==
The forest buzzard is endemic to South Africa, Lesotho and Eswatini where it occurs in an arc from the mountains of eastern Limpopo Province south through the Drakensberg of Kwazulu-Natal to the Western Cape.

It as, at least, a partial migrant and seems to be a winter visitor (June–August) in the Drakensberg of Eastern Cape northwards where there are no breeding records. Two birds ringed in the east (Kwazulu-Natal and Mpumalanga) were subsequently recovered in the south of South Africa having moved between 800–1,300 km (500–810 mi).

== Habitat ==
The forest buzzard, as its name implies, inhabits evergreen woodlands, including introduced eucalyptus and pines, whereas the steppe buzzard prefers more open habitats. However, habitat alone is not a good indicator for these species.

== Habits ==
The forest buzzard hunts along the edge of or in the forest, where it is a sit and wait predator which pounces on prey from a perch. It has been recorded as preying on small mammals, birds up to the size of a turaco or a francolin, snakes, lizards, frogs, grasshoppers, wasps, beetles and scorpions.

Its breeding biology is little known but it is thought to be territorial and monogamous. The nest is a large structure of sticks with an interior cup, lined with green leaves and sometimes with beard lichen Usnea spp. It is typically situated in the fork or lower branch of a tree in the forest interior, especially pines or eucalyptus but also indigenous trees such as small-leaved yellowwood (Afrocarpus falcatus). The two eggs are laid in the period from August–November, with most being laid in September–October. The eggs are laid asynchronously so the first laid hatches first and the older sibling is aggressive to its younger chick, preventing it from having food and if food is scarce the younger one will starve. They fledge at about 47 days old and become fully independent roughly four months.

== Taxonomy ==
The forest buzzard forms part of a superspecies which includes the common buzzard and the Madagascar buzzard, as well as the mountain buzzard. The decision to treat forest buzzard and mountain buzzard as different species is based on differences in habitat, structure and plumages and the fact that the two taxa are not monophyletic. It is likely that the forest buzzard evolved from the steppe buzzard, which is a common wintering bird within the breeding range of the forest buzzard. The steppe buzzards is a generalist and breeds over a large area of the eastern Palearctic in a variety of habitats and winters widely in eastern and southern Africa, with a few non-breeding birds remaining in southern Africa over the northern summer.

== Conservation status ==
The forest buzzard was formerly considered threatened in South Africa but the increase in exotic plantations and the species adaptation to breed in those plantations has allowed the population to increase. It is therefore treated as Near Threatened by the IUCN
