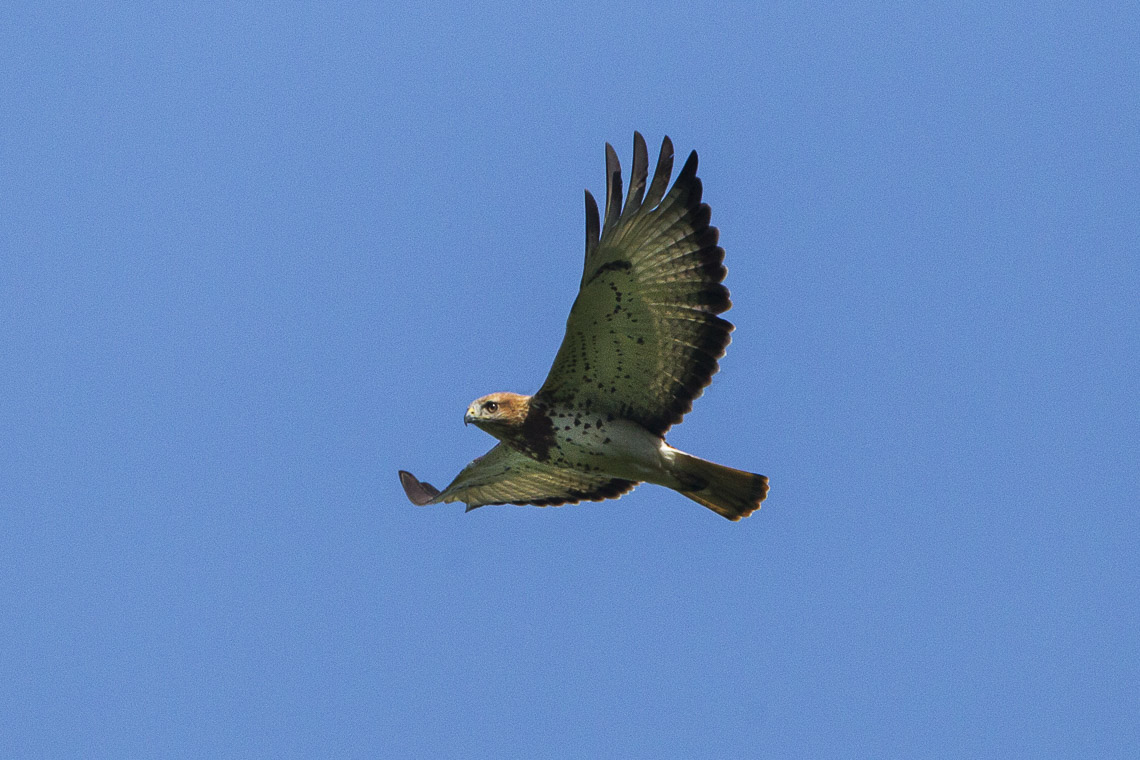

Conservation status
- Least Concern (IUCN 3.1)

Scientific classification
- Kingdom: Animalia
- Phylum: Chordata
- Class: Aves
- Order: Accipitriformes
- Family: Accipitridae
- Genus: Buteo
- Species: B. auguralis

Binomial name
- Buteo auguralis Salvadori, 1866

= Red-necked buzzard =

Species of bird

The red-necked buzzard (Buteo auguralis), also known as the African red-tailed buzzard, is a species of buzzard in the family Accipitridae which is found in western and northern central Africa.

== Description ==
The red-necked buzzard is a medium-sized bird of prey with a distinctive rufous neck, the rufous colour extends up over the crown and down on to the upper back. The rest of the upperparts are mostly blackish, except for the rufous upper tail feathers which has a black subterminal bar. The underparts are mainly white, apart from a dark throat and dark blotches which extend along the flanks. Juveniles resemble the adults, but have a browner upperparts, creamy rather than white underparts and lack the dark throat.

== Distribution and movements ==
The red-necked buzzard occurs in a broad band running from Mauritania south to Liberia then eastwards to Ethiopia and Uganda, as well as south along the Gulf of Guinea coast through Gabon to the Democratic Republic of Congo and north-eastern Angola.

The red-necked buzzard is a partial migrant, the northern populations may be completely migrant which leave the savanna following the rains and spend the dry season to the south along the edge of the main forest zone.

== Habitat ==
The red-necked buzzard prefers forest edges and clearings, including those within secondary and primary forests but it occurs in cultivated areas and is generally absent from the main areas of lowland rainforest up to an altitude of 2,500 metres.

== Habits ==
The red-necked buzzard normally hunts by sitting in wait on a perch, scanning the ground for prey which is caught by a swooping dive down on to the prey. It is a generalist hunter and the prey taken consists of a wide variety of small animals including rodents, birds, lizards and snakes, as well as arthropods and especially termites.

This species builds a stick nest which is situated in the upper fork of a large forest tree, on cliff ledges or on pylons, pairs will utilise same nest site in successive years. The clutch size is normally one or two eggs, which are probably laid in November to January in the northern part of its range and later in the south, where young have been seen in the nest in August.
