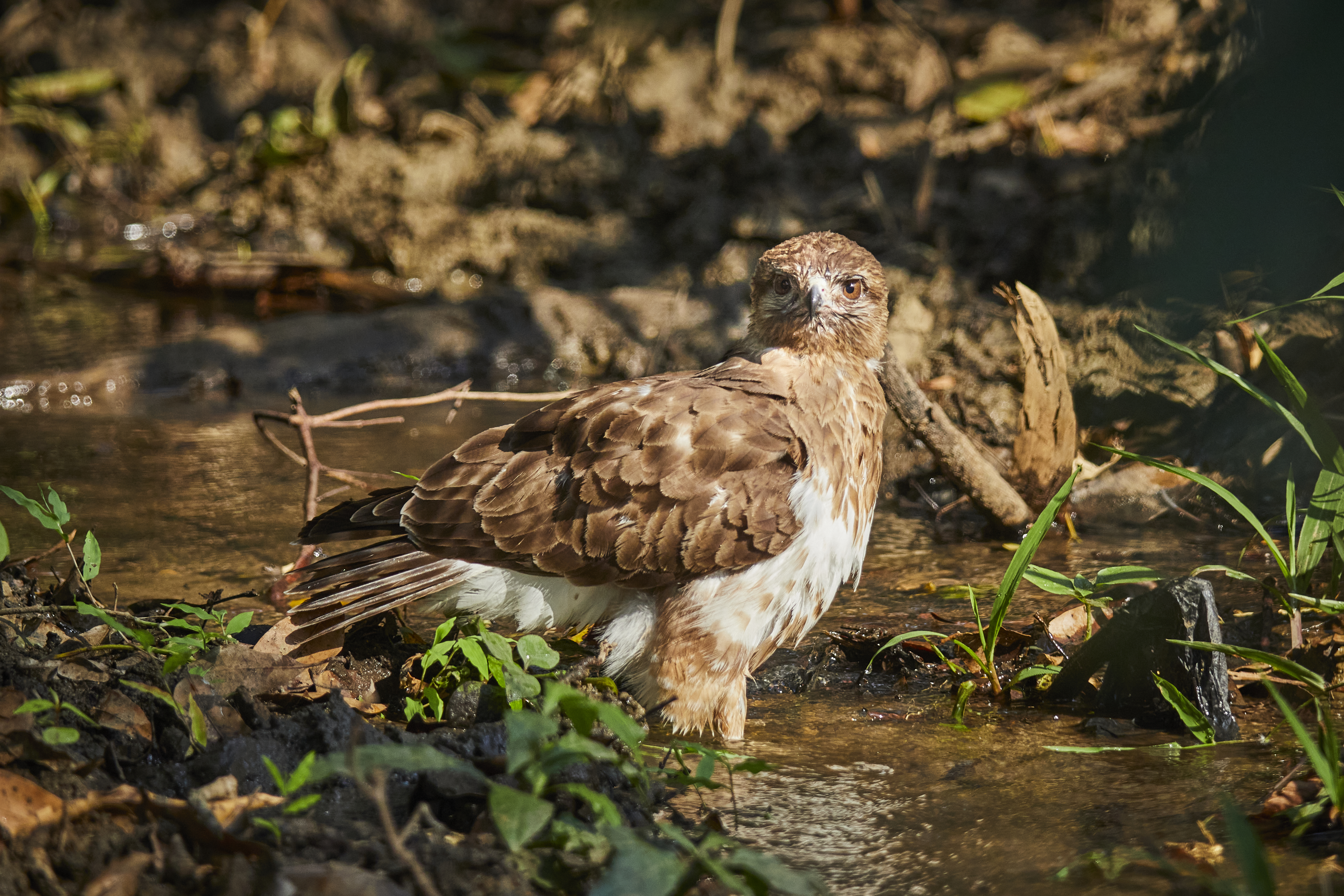

Conservation status
- Least Concern (IUCN 3.1)

Scientific classification
- Kingdom: Animalia
- Phylum: Chordata
- Class: Aves
- Order: Accipitriformes
- Family: Accipitridae
- Genus: Buteo
- Species: B. brachypterus

Binomial name
- Buteo brachypterus Hartlaub, 1860
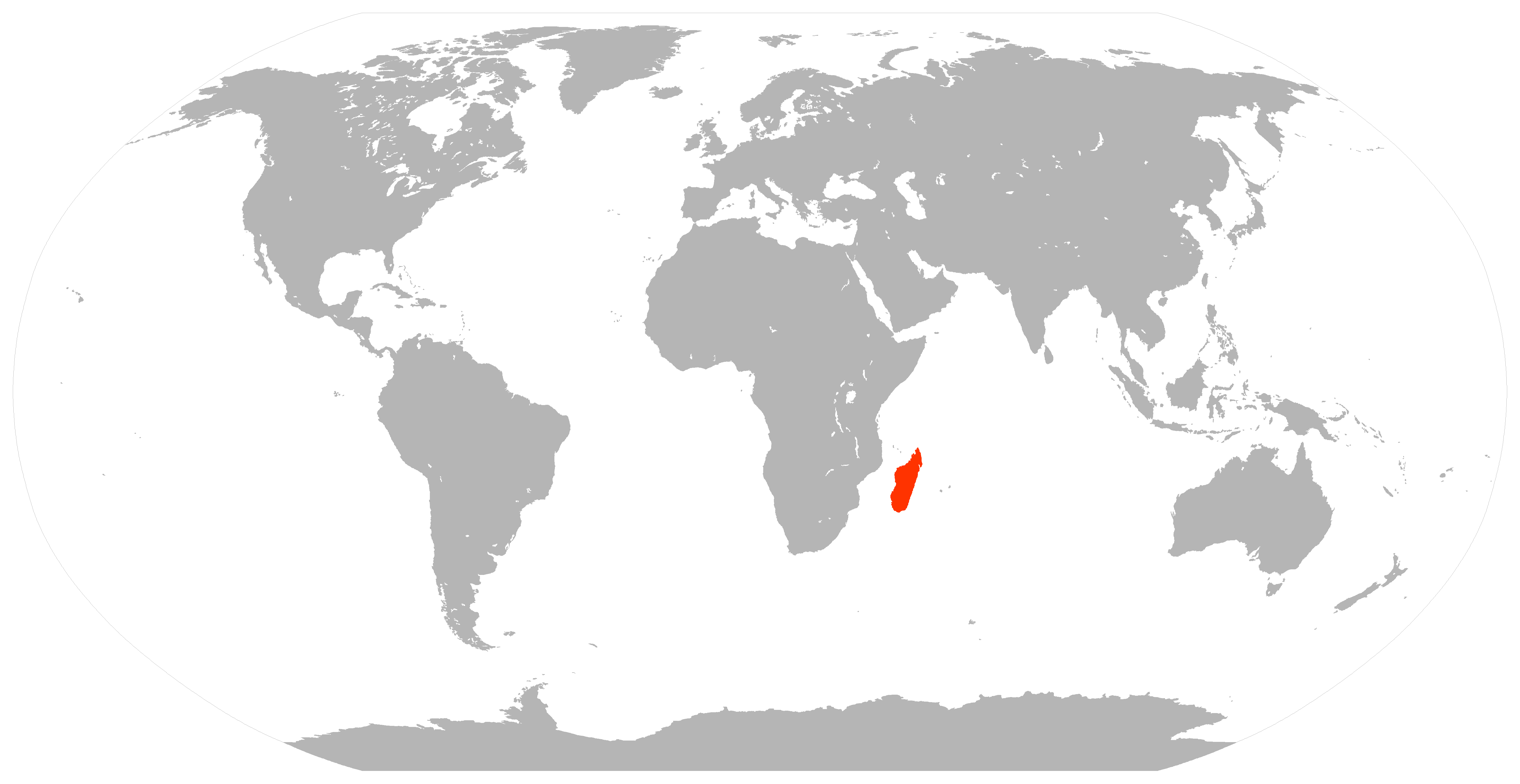

= Madagascar buzzard =

Species of bird

The Madagascar buzzard (Buteo brachypterus) is a bird of prey which is endemic to Madagascar. It is a species from the widespread genus Buteo in the family Accipitridae.

== Description ==
The Madagascar buzzard is a typical old-world buzzard showing quite a lot of variability in plumage and which is similar to the forest buzzard of Africa and the palearctic common buzzard. They have a dark grey head, a white patch on the breast, the brownish -white vent and thighs are spotted with brown. The tail is marked with broad brownish-black bars. The bill is black with a greyish blue cere, the eyes are yellow and the legs and feet are pale yellow.

== Distribution and habitat ==
Endemic to Madagascar where it is common, except for the deforested central plateau where it is less common, there is some indication that its population is increasing as the forest is fragmented.

The Madagascar buzzard is adaptable as to its habitat and is found in a wide variety of habitats including forest, open woodland and regenerating, secondary forest. It can also be found on rocky hillsides up to 2300 metres above sea level. Although it is so adaptable it is still less common on the deforested central plateau.

== Habits ==
The Madagascar buzzard has a breeding season which extends from July to November, It builds its nest in the fork of a tree, in a palm tree or on a cliff ledge, constructing it from sticks and lining it with fresh foliage. The clutch is normally made up of 1-2 eggs which the female lays spaced apart but starts incubating as soon as the first one is laid. Once the eggs hatched the older sibling usually kills the younger and only very rarely are two chicks raised to fledging. Incubation last 4–5 weeks and the fledging period is 6–7 weeks.

This species is an opportunistic hunter which take a wide variety of prey including small mammals, birds, lizards, snakes, frogs, terrestrial crabs and other large arthropods. In addition, scientists observing the behaviour of lemurs (in particular the ruffed lemur and Verreaux's sifaka) have recorded them making alarm calls at the sight of a Madagascar buzzard, suggesting that young may occasionally be preyed upon.
