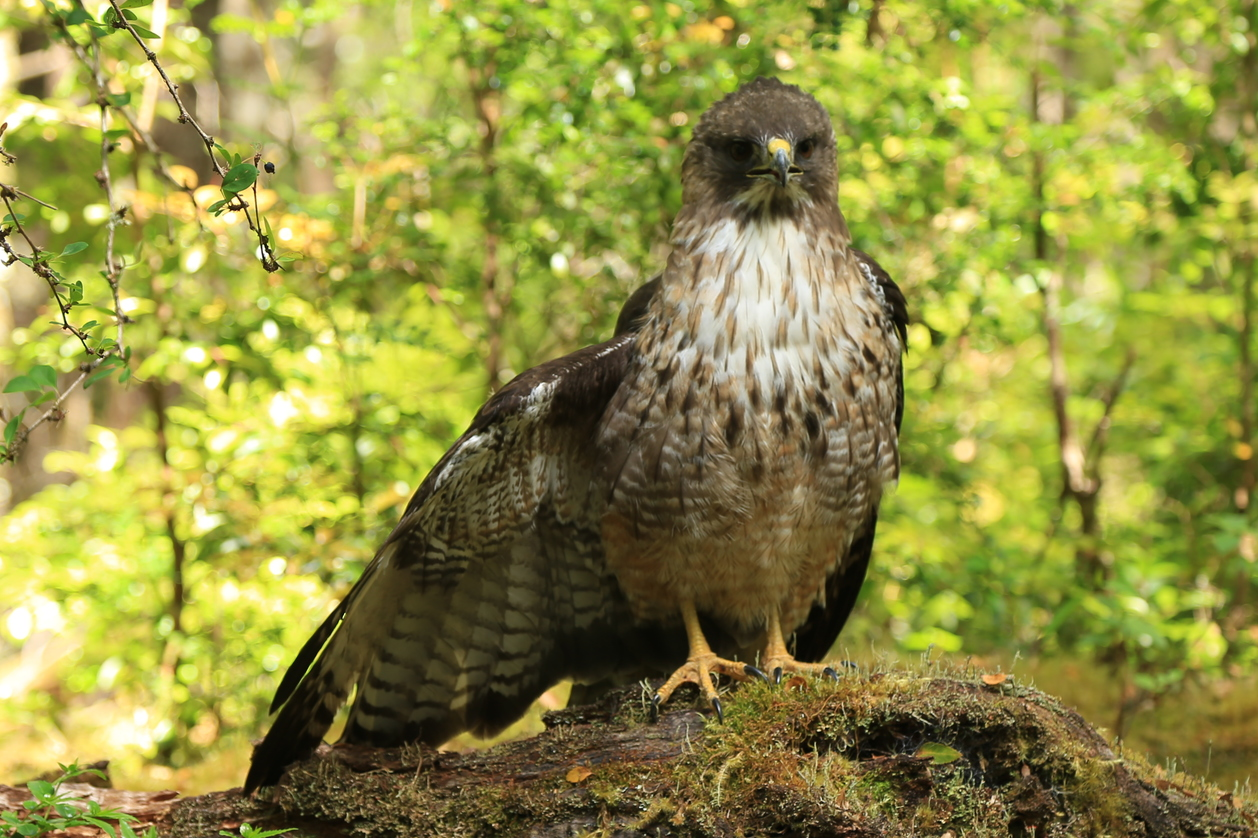
- in Aysén, Chile

Conservation status
- Endangered (IUCN 3.1)

Scientific classification
- Kingdom: Animalia
- Phylum: Chordata
- Class: Aves
- Order: Accipitriformes
- Family: Accipitridae
- Genus: Buteo
- Species: B. ventralis

Binomial name
- Buteo ventralis Gould, 1837

= Rufous-tailed hawk =

Species of bird

The rufous-tailed hawk (Buteo ventralis) is a species of bird of prey in the family Accipitridae.

The rufous-tailed hawk is found in southern Argentina and Chile, including the entire region of Tierra del Fuego. Its natural habitats are temperate forests, subtropical or tropical dry shrubland, subtropical or tropical high-altitude shrubland, and temperate grassland.

== Description ==
The rufous-tailed hawk is similar to the red-tailed hawk. It was first recorded by Charles Darwin in Patagonia while on his voyage of the Beagle. The rufous-tailed hawk is a medium-sized hawk with a wing span of 45–60 cm. The overall size range of the hawk is 54–60 cm. There are two different colorations of the rufous-tailed hawk. The more common pale version of the hawk has a blackish brown upper parts, with a darker cap and cinnamon feathers along the side of the head and neck. The belly is white with dark markings and reddish brown coloration on it. The dark version is basically all black with whitish edging on the feathers. The call of the rufous-tailed hawk sounds like kee-ahrr.

== Habitat ==
The rufous-tailed hawk has been spotted living in a number of different habitat types, including evergreen beech forest, mature forest and new growth forest that have been burned over, and finally in open country. The best theory for their ideal habitat was developed by Figueroa et al. (2000), Trejo et al. (2006), and Rivas et al. (2009), who all suggested that rufous-tailed hawks' ideal habitat is somewhere with high trees near open areas that are good for hunting for prey. So far, there have been no reports of the rufous-tailed hawk living in human areas like cities or abandoned buildings.

== Feeding ==
The rufous-tailed hawk feeds on a large variety of prey. They feed on everything from other birds to mammals and reptiles. This shows that rufous-tailed hawks have a very broad diet that is similar to the red-tailed hawk. Figueroa et al. (2000) reported the rufous-tailed hawk feeding on southern lapwing, Norwegian rat, European hare, red-breasted meadowlark, Chilean flicker, short-tailed snake, and even a few unidentified beetles. Feeding or prey capture was also recorded to happen in forest and in prairies.

== Breeding ==
Rufous-tailed hawks have a longer recorded nestling period compared to other species of Buteo. Rufous-tailed and red-tailed hawks have around the same nestling periods: around 49 days for rufous-tailed hawks compared to 45–46 days for red-tailed hawks. The egg clutch size of a rufous-tailed hawk has only been reported to between 1-3 eggs in a nest.

== Threats ==
Rufous-tailed hawks are threatened by many factors, especially habitat loss. Rufous-tailed hawks have been losing their habitat because of logging, over grazing by sheep and cattle, and the growth of Pinus and Eucalyptus plantations. Pinus radiata and Eucalyptus globulus are fast-growing invasive plants that were introduced in order to spur the timber industry in Chile. The other main threat to rufous-tailed hawks are local people, who sometimes kill these birds because rufous-tailed hawks attack and eat their domesticated animals.

== Population estimates ==
Ferguson-Lees and Christie (2001) estimated the population size to be around 100 individuals. In 2001, the IUCN ranked them at only "low risk". They were first listed as Vulnerable in 2015, and uplisted again in 2025 to Endangered. As of 2025, their estimated population is 700 – 3,300 mature individuals.
