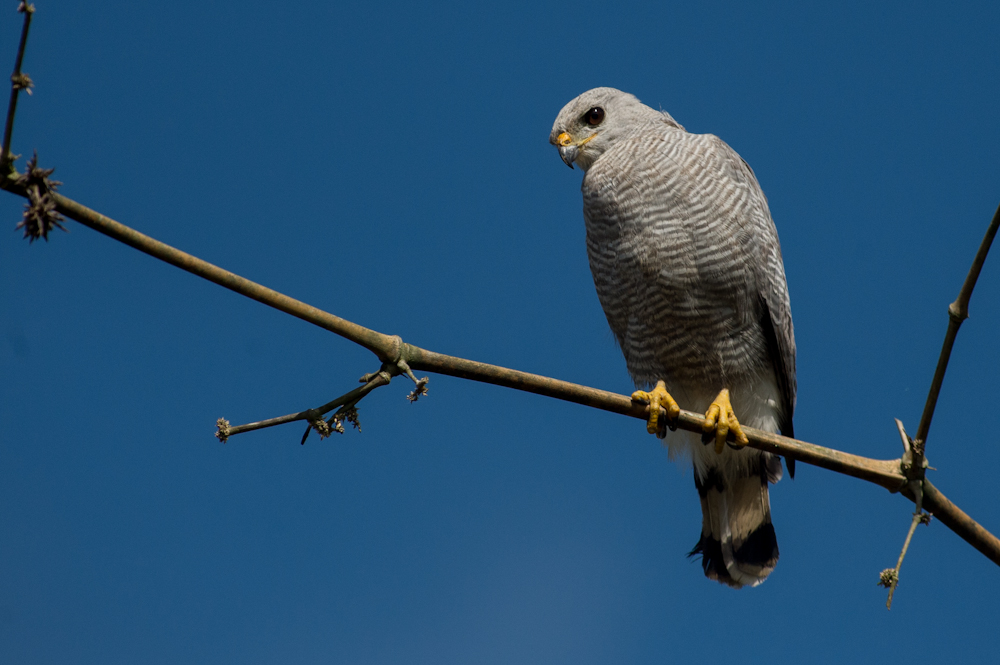

Conservation status
- Least Concern (IUCN 3.1)

Scientific classification
- Kingdom: Animalia
- Phylum: Chordata
- Class: Aves
- Order: Accipitriformes
- Family: Accipitridae
- Genus: Buteo
- Species: B. nitidus

Binomial name
- Buteo nitidus (Latham, 1790)

Subspecies
- B. n. blakei - Hellmayr & Conover, 1949; B. n. nitidus - (Latham, 1790); B. n. pallidus - (Todd, 1915)

Synonyms
- Asturina nitida

= Gray-lined hawk =

Species of bird

The gray-lined hawk (Buteo nitidus) is a smallish raptor found in open country and forest edges. It is sometimes placed in the genus Asturina as Asturina nitida. The species has been split by the American Ornithological Society from the gray hawk. The gray-lined hawk is found from El Salvador to Argentina, as well as on the Caribbean island of Trinidad.

== Description ==
The gray-lined hawk is 46–61 cm (18–24 in) in length and weighs 475 g (16.8 oz) average. The adult has a pale gray body, the tail is black with three white bands and the legs are orange. It has fine white barring on the upper parts. Immature birds have dark brown upperparts, a pale-banded brown tail, brown-spotted white underparts and a brown streaked buff head and neck. This species is quite short-winged, and has a fast agile flight for a Buteo.

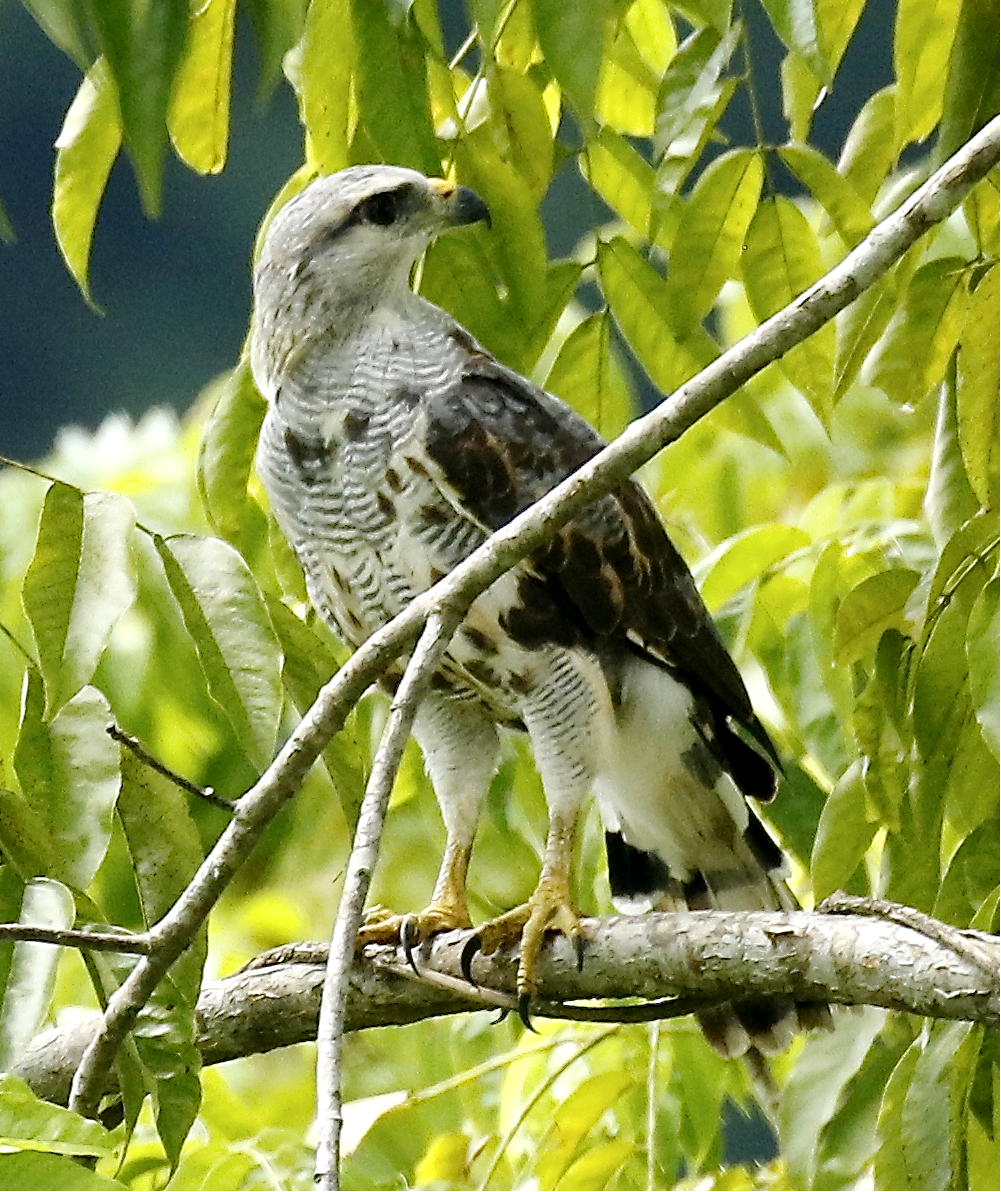
Aligandi area - Darien, Panama

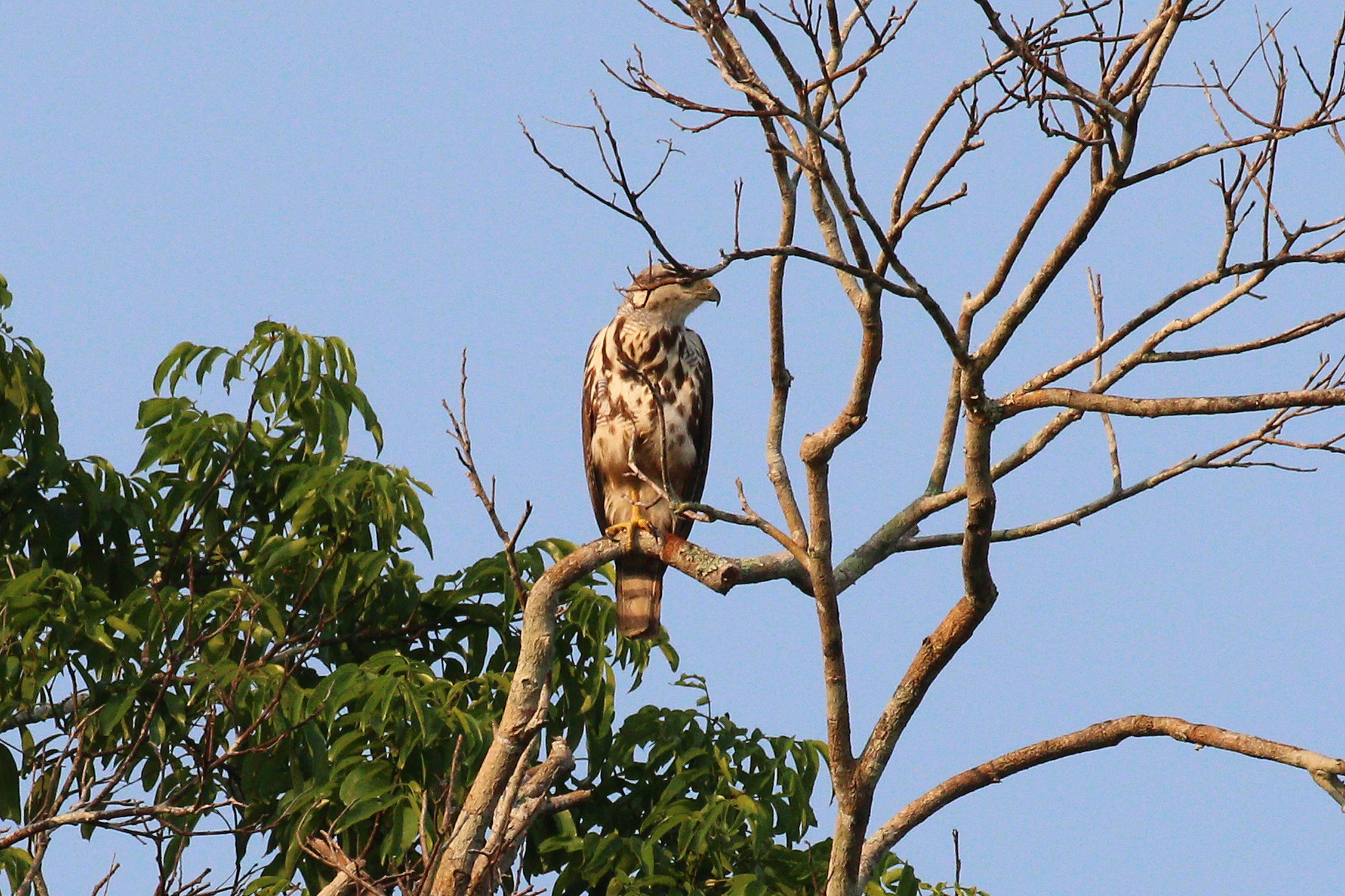
Juvenile Cristalino River, South Amazon, Brazil

== Diet ==
It feeds mainly on lizards and snakes, but will also take insects (such as beetles and grasshoppers), small mammals (such as rabbits, squirrels and mice), birds (such as quails and nestling doves), frogs, toads, other amphibians and fish. It usually sits on an open high perch from which it swoops on its prey, but will also hunt from a low glide.

== Breeding ==
The nest is of sticks and built high in a tree. The usual clutch is one to three, usually two white to pale blue eggs. The young take about 6 weeks to fledging.
