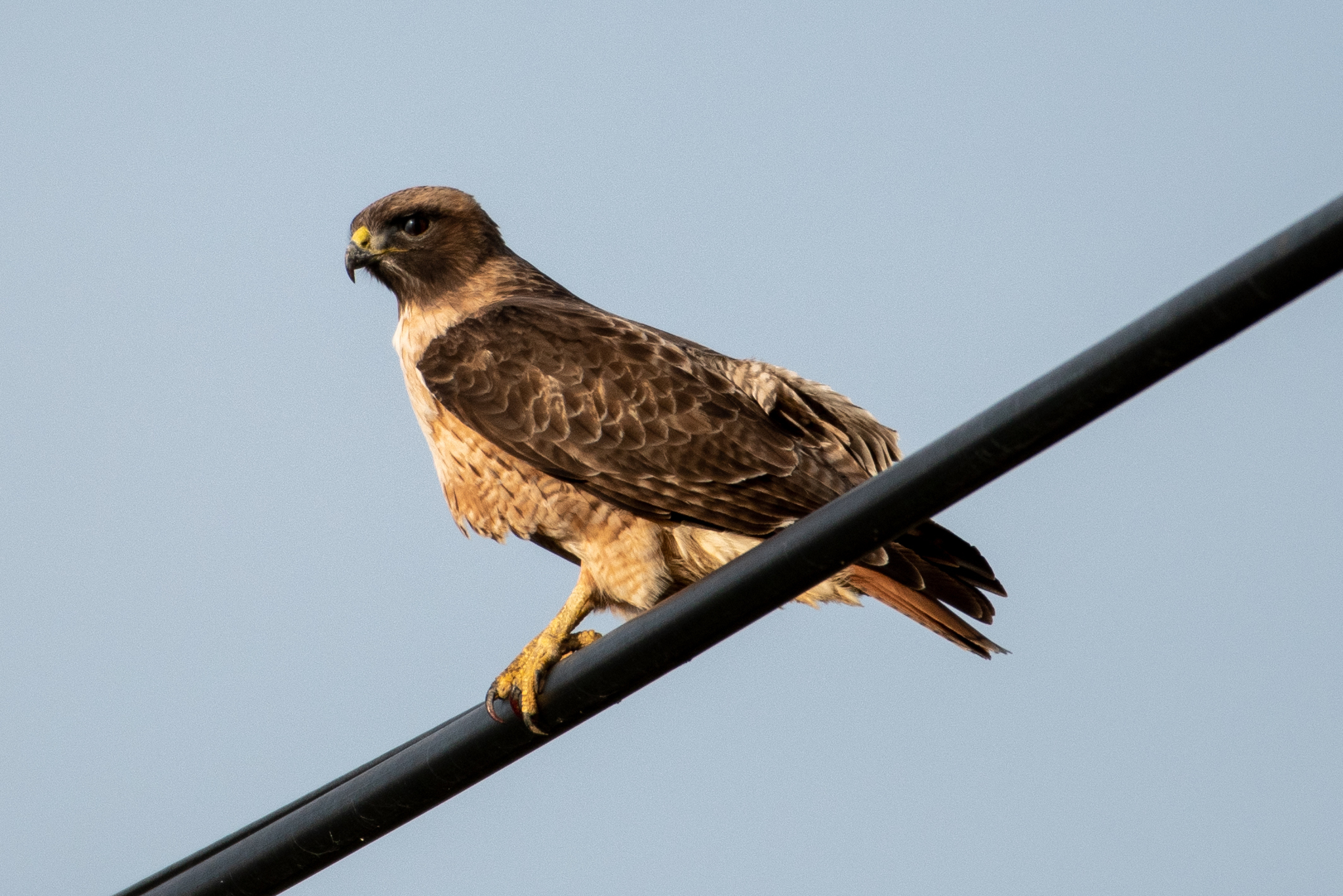

Scientific classification
- Kingdom: Animalia
- Phylum: Chordata
- Class: Aves
- Order: Accipitriformes
- Family: Accipitridae
- Genus: Buteo
- Species: B. jamaicensis
- Subspecies: B. j. calurus

Trinomial name
- Buteo jamaicensis calurus Cassin, 1855

= Western red-tailed hawk =

Subspecies of bird

The western red-tailed hawk (Buteo jamaicensis calurus) is a subspecies of the red-tailed hawk.

== Description ==
In wing chord males range from 354 to 404 mm (13.9 to 15.9 in), averaging 386.8 mm (15.23 in), and females range from 386 to 428 mm (15.2 to 16.9 in), averaging 411.2 mm (16.19 in). males and females average 224.2 and 237.3 mm (8.83 and 9.34 in) in tail length, 85.4 and 88.1 mm (3.36 and 3.47 in) in tarsal length and 25.1 and 27.4 mm (0.99 and 1.08 in) in culmen length.

The two largest samples of body mass in B. j. calurus showed that in Idaho, around the greater area of the Snake River NCA, 90 males averaged 957 g (2.110 lb) and 113 females averaged 1,150 g (2.54 lb), while 152 migrating B. j. calurus at the Goshute Mountains of Nevada averaged 933.4 g (2.058 lb).

Adult B. j. calurus are usually rangier and darker than the eastern red-tailed hawk (B. j. borealis), with pale individuals usually having a richer tawny base color (with occasionally a pale rufous color showing around the chest or neck), typically a heavily streaked breast and belly band, a brownish throat, dark barring on the flanks, a well-defined tawny V on the back and, occasionally, a tail with multiple bars.

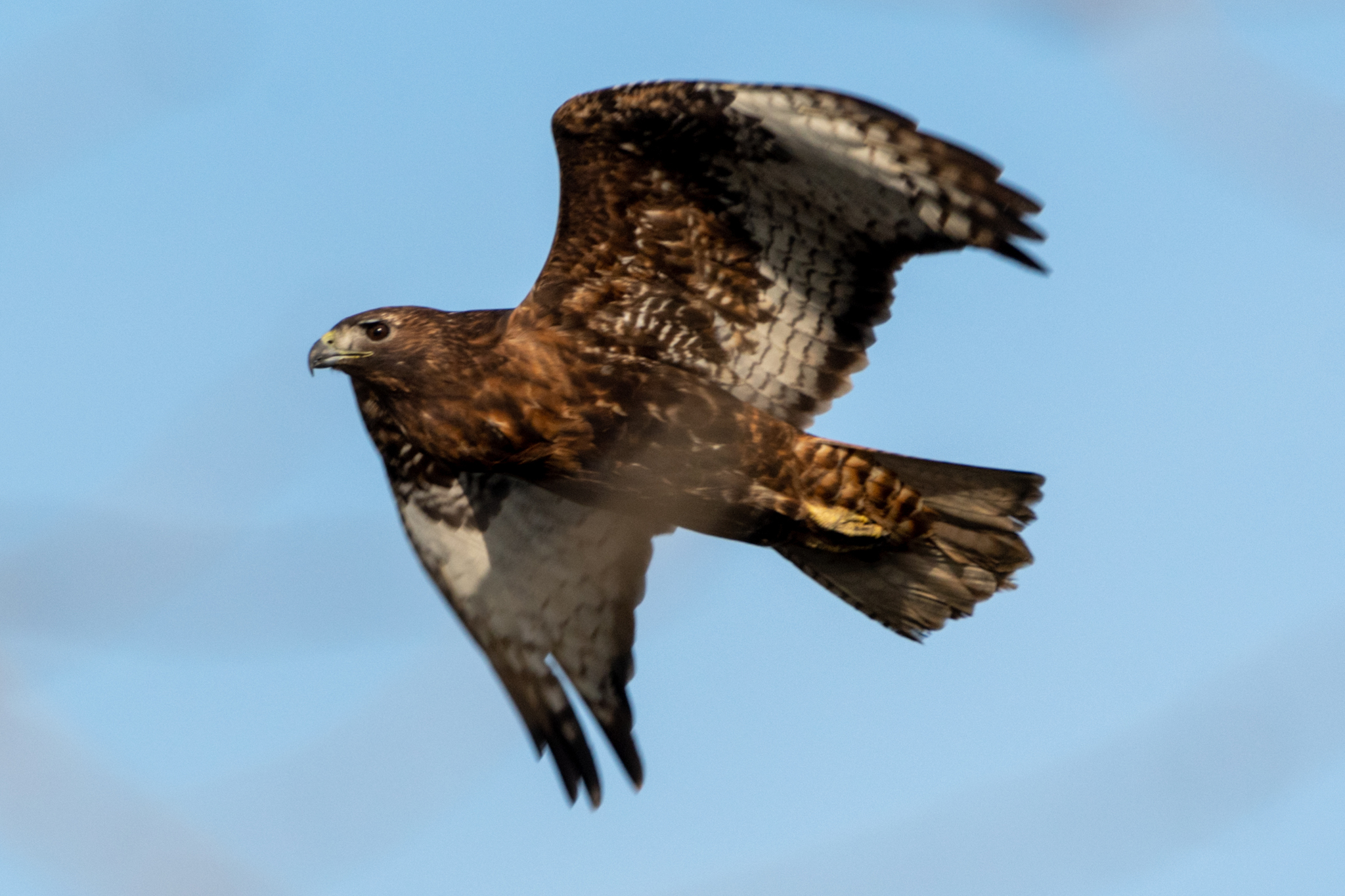
Western red tailed hawk (dark morph) in flight

Dark morph B. j. calurus adults are typically all chocolate brown above and below (although sometimes variously even jet black or with a bit of tawny feather edging below) with a rufous tail, which sometimes has heavy blackish crossbars but is usually similar to other red tails. Dark morph juveniles are usually mostly dark brown but with extensive pale mottling on the back and occasional tawny-edge feathers on the underside and slightly broader bars on the tail than pale morph B. j. calurus.

Intermediate or rufous morphs are rich rufous on the breast, with a broad, solid chocolate-brown belly band and heavily barred thighs and crissum. Like dark morphs, rufous morph adults usually lack the incomplete V on the back, but sometimes rufous feathers can manifest on one. Adults may show nearly endless variation in coloring and many may combine several characteristics of the three main morphs. Rufous morph immatures are more similar to pale morph ones but are considerably more heavily streaked almost everywhere below from the thighs to the upper chest. Individuals of northwestern Mexico may average paler than most B. j. calurus, lacking the typical dark wing markings.

== Distribution ==
This race seems to have the greatest longitudinal breeding distribution of any race of red-tailed hawk, and put together with B. j. borealis these two subspecies may occupy nearly 75% of the breeding range of red-tailed hawks in North America. B. j. calurus reaches its northern limits as a breeder in north-central British Columbia, much of the western part of the Yukon, interior Alaska and, near Inuvik in the Northwest Territories, the latter being the northernmost breeding range of the red-tailed hawk species. The race may breed as far south as northwestern Sonora in Mexico. Its eastern limits are reached around central Manitoba, while to the south the states of Montana, Wyoming, Utah, New Mexico and Colorado are mostly occupied by B. j. calurus. Wintering birds from interior southwestern British Columbia may move south to as far as southwest to Guatemala and northern Nicaragua. Linearly, this relatively large subspecies can seem to run almost contrary to Bergmann's rule, with birds of the Great Basin being longer winged than most Canadian ones.
