= Wing chord (biology) =

Anatomical measurement of a bird's wing

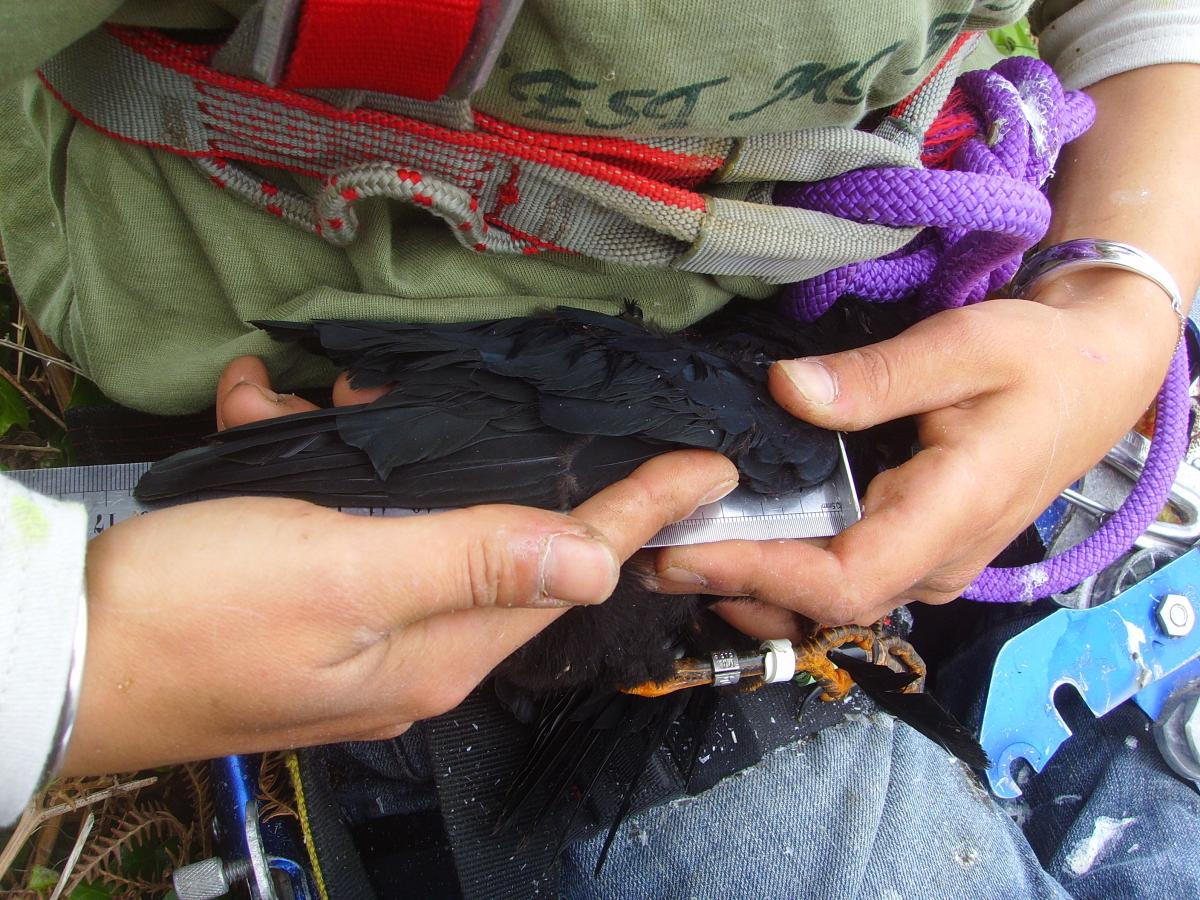
Wing chord measure on a red-billed chough juvenile during ringing.

Wing chord is an anatomical measurement of a bird's wing. The measurement is taken with the wing bent at a 90-degree angle, from the most prominent point of the wrist joint to the most prominent point of the longest primary feather. It is often taken as a standard measurement of the proportions of a bird and used to differentiate between species and subspecies.

== See also ==
- Bird measurement
