= List of birds of Rocky Mountain National Park =

Coordinates: 40.3466°N 105.7364°W

Location of Rocky Mountain National Park in the United States

.

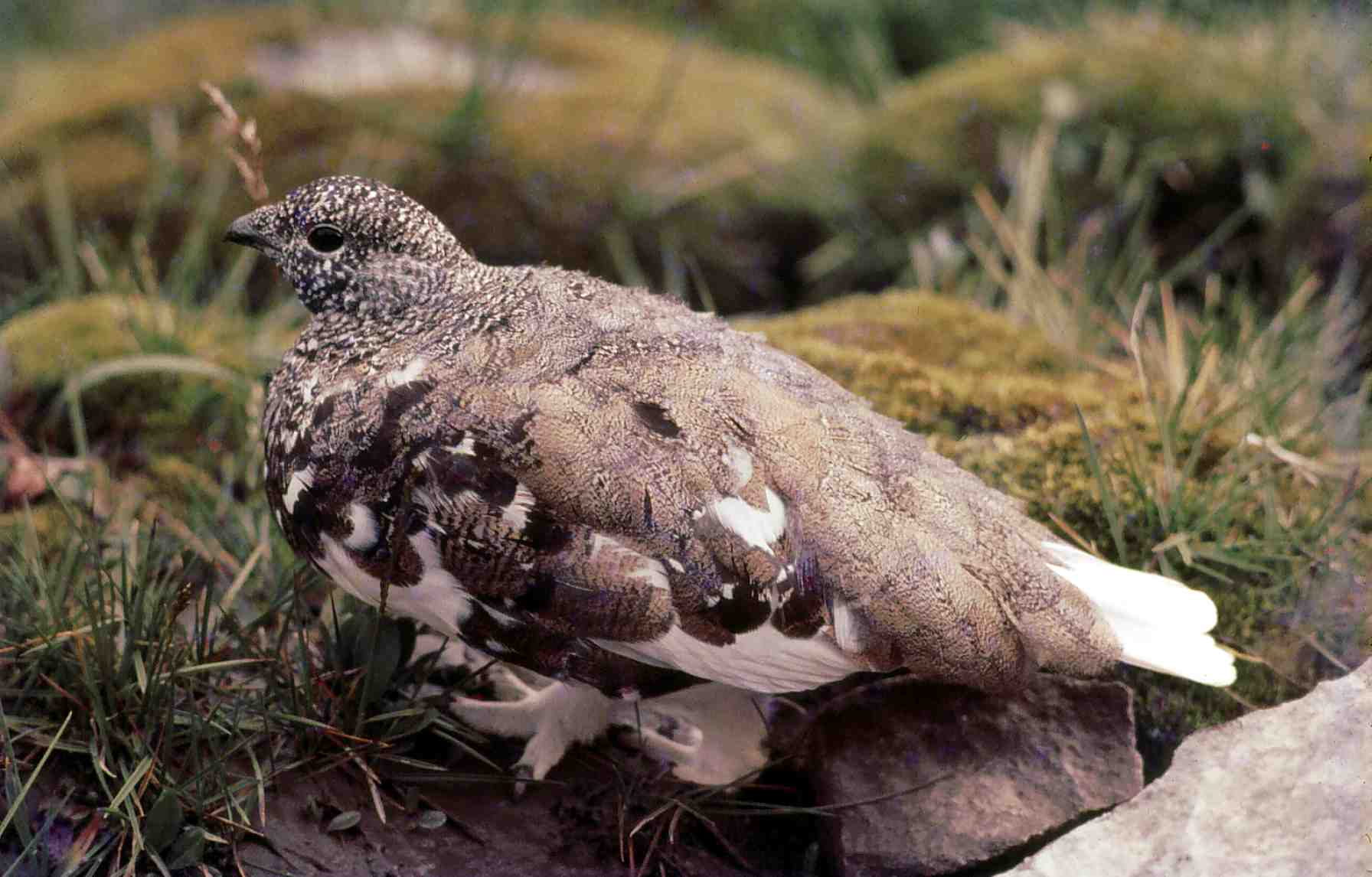
A white-tailed ptarmigan, common above timberline.

This is a comprehensive listing of the bird species recorded in Rocky Mountain National Park, a 265,461 acres (107,428 ha) park in the U.S. state of Colorado. This list is based on one published by the National Park Service (NPS).

This list is presented in the taxonomic sequence of the Check-list of North and Middle American Birds, 7th edition through the 66th Supplement, published by the American Ornithological Society (AOS). Common and scientific names are also those of the Check-list, except that the common names of families are from the Clements taxonomy because the AOS list does not include them.

This list contains 265 species and eight identifiable subspecies or forms when taxonomic changes have been made. Unless otherwise noted, all are considered to occur regularly in Rocky Mountain National Park as permanent residents, summer or winter visitors, or migrants. The tags below are used to designate the abundance of some less-common species.

- (R) Rare - "usually seen only a few times each year" per the NPS (60 species)
- (U) Uncommon - "likely to be seen monthly in appropriate habitat and season and may be locally common" per the NPS (82 species)
- (O) Occasional - "occur in a park at least once every few years, varying in numbers, but not necessarily every year" per the NPS (58 species)
- (H) Historical - "not in park" per the NPS, but historical records exist (6 species)
- (Unc) Unconfirmed - "Attributed to the park based on weak ... or no evidence, giving minimal indication of the species' occurrence in the park" per the NPS (12 species)
- (I) Introduced - a species introduced to North America by humans (5 species)

== Ducks, geese, and waterfowl ==
Order: Anseriformes Family: Anatidae

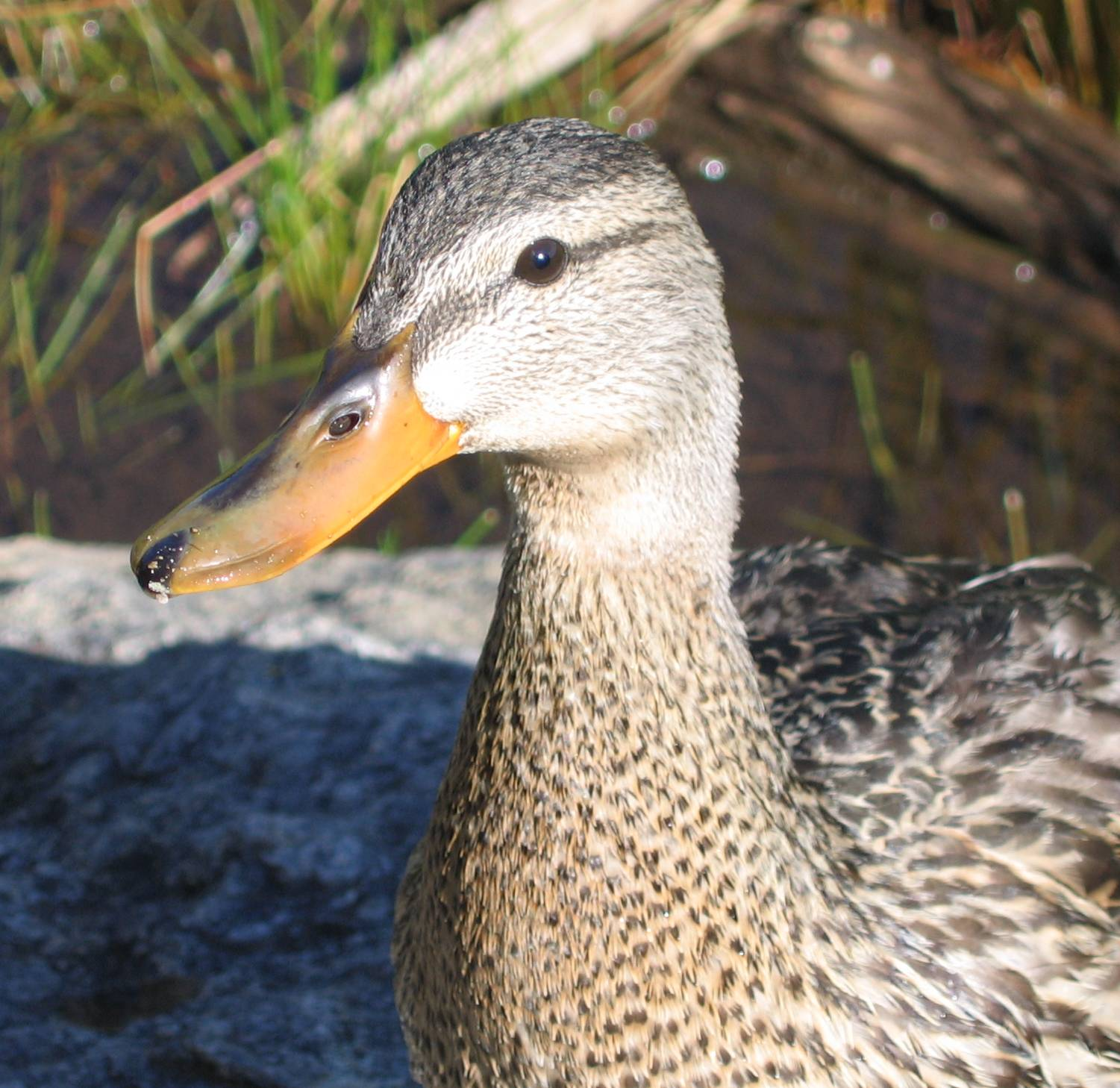
A female mallard

Anatidae includes the ducks and most duck-like waterfowl, such as geese and swans. These birds are adapted to an aquatic existence with webbed feet, bills which are flattened to a greater or lesser extent, and feathers that are excellent at shedding water due to special oils.

- Greater white-fronted goose, Anser albifrons, lakes, marshes (O)
- Canada goose, Branta canadensis, lakes, marshes, rivers (U)
- Wood duck, Aix sponsa, lakes, marshes (R)
- Blue-winged teal, Spatula discors, lakes, marshes, rivers (U)
- Cinnamon teal, Spatula cyanoptera, lakes, marshes, rivers (U)
- Northern shoveler, Spatula clypatea, lakes, marshes, rivers (R)
- Gadwall, Mareca strepera, lakes, marshes, rivers
- American wigeon, Mareca americana, lakes, marshes, rivers (R)
- Mallard, Anas platyrhynchos, lakes, marshes, rivers
- Northern pintail, Anas acuta, lakes, marshes, rivers (R)
- Green-winged teal, Anas crecca, lakes, marshes, rivers (U)
- Canvasback, Athya valisineria, lakes, marshes (R)
- Redhead, Athya americana, lakes, marshes (U)
- Ring-necked duck, Athya collaris, lakes, marshes, rivers (U)
- Lesser scaup, Athya affinis, lakes, marshes (U)
- Bufflehead, Bucephala albeola, lakes, rivers (U)
- Barrow's goldeneye, Bucephala islandica, lakes (O)
- Common merganser, Mergus merganser, lakes, marshes, rivers
- Ruddy duck, Oxyura jamaicensis, lakes, marshes (U)

== New World quail ==
Order: Galliformes Family: Odontophoridae

The New World quails are small, plump terrestrial birds only distantly related to the quails of the Old World, but named for their similar appearance and habits.

- Northern bobwhite, Colinus virginianus (H)

== Pheasants, grouse, and allies ==
Order: Galliformes Family: Phasianidae

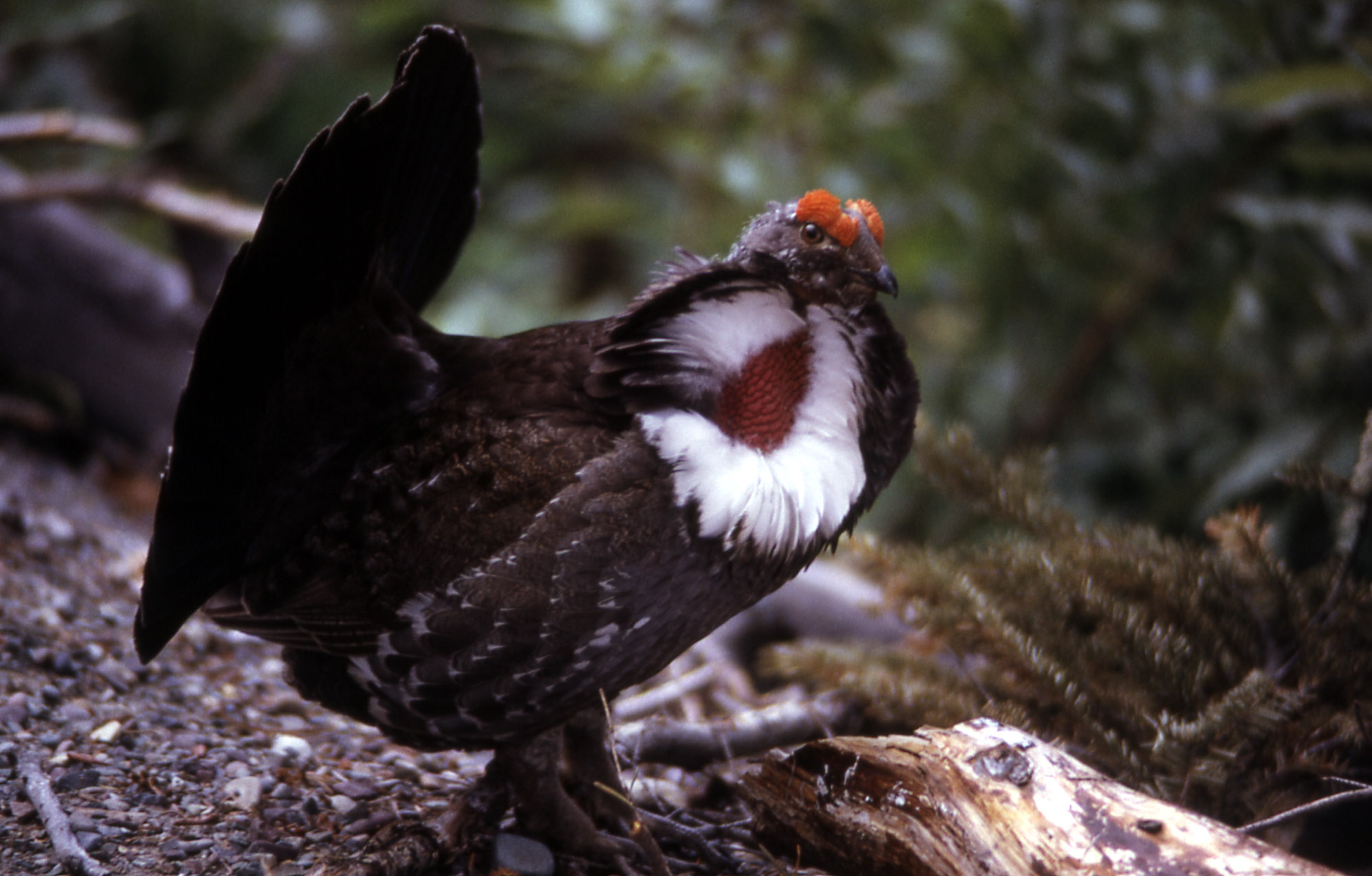
A dusky grouse

Phasianidae consists of the pheasants and their allies. These are terrestrial species, variable in size but generally plump with broad relatively short wings. Many species are gamebirds or have been domesticated as a food source for humans.

- Wild turkey, Meleagris gallapavo, montane forests, meadows (R) (introduced to the park)
- Greater sage-grouse, Centrocercus urophasianus (H)
- White-tailed ptarmigan, Lagopus leucurus, alpine tundra (U)
- Dusky grouse, Dendragapus obscurus, montane and subalpine forests, meadows
- Ring-necked pheasant, Phasianus colchicus (I) (H)
- Chukar, Alectoris chukar (I) (H)

== Grebes ==
Order: Podicipediformes Family: Podicipedidae

Grebes are small to medium-large freshwater diving birds. They have lobed toes and are excellent swimmers and divers. However, they have their feet placed far back on the body, making them quite ungainly on land.

- Pied-billed grebe, Podilymbus podiceps, lakes, marshes (U)
- Horned grebe, Podiceps auritus, lakes, marshes (O)
- Eared grebe, Podiceps nigricollis, lakes, marshes (U)
- Western grebe, Aechmophorus occidentalis, lakes, marshes (U)

== Pigeons and doves ==
Order: Columbiformes Family: Columbidae

Pigeons and doves are stout-bodied birds with short necks and short slender bills with a fleshy cere. They feed on seeds, fruit, and plants. Unlike most other birds, the doves and pigeons produce "crop milk", which is secreted by a sloughing of fluid-filled cells from the lining of the crop. Both sexes produce this highly nutritious substance to feed to the young.

- Mourning dove, Zenaida macroura, montane forests, riparian (U)
- Band-tailed pigeon, Patagioenas fasciata, aspen forests, riparian (U)
- Rock pigeon, Columba livia, developed areas (U) (I)

== Cuckoos ==
Order: Cuculiformes Family: Cuculidae

The family Cuculidae includes cuckoos, roadrunners, and anis. These birds are of variable size with slender bodies, long tails, and strong legs.

- Yellow-billed cuckoo, Coccyzus americanus (H)

== Nightjars and allies ==
Order: Caprimulgiformes Family: Caprimulgidae

Nightjars are medium-sized nocturnal birds that usually nest on the ground. They have long wings, short legs, and very short bills. Most have small feet, of little use for walking, and long pointed wings. Their soft plumage is cryptically colored to resemble bark or leaves.

- Common nighthawk, Chordeiles minor, riparian, montane forests, meadows (U)
- Common poorwill, Phalaenoptilus nuttallii, montane forests, meadows (R)

== Swifts ==
Order: Apodiformes Family: Apodidae

The swifts are small birds which spend the majority of their lives flying. These birds have very short legs and never settle voluntarily on the ground, perching instead only on vertical surfaces. Many swifts have long swept-back wings which resemble a crescent or boomerang.

- Black swift, Cypseloides niger, cliffs, rocky areas, waterfalls (U)
- Chimney swift, Chaetura pelagica (Unc)
- White-throated swift, Aeronautes saxatalis, cliffs, canyons, rocky areas (U)

== Hummingbirds ==
Order: Apodiformes Family: Trochilidae

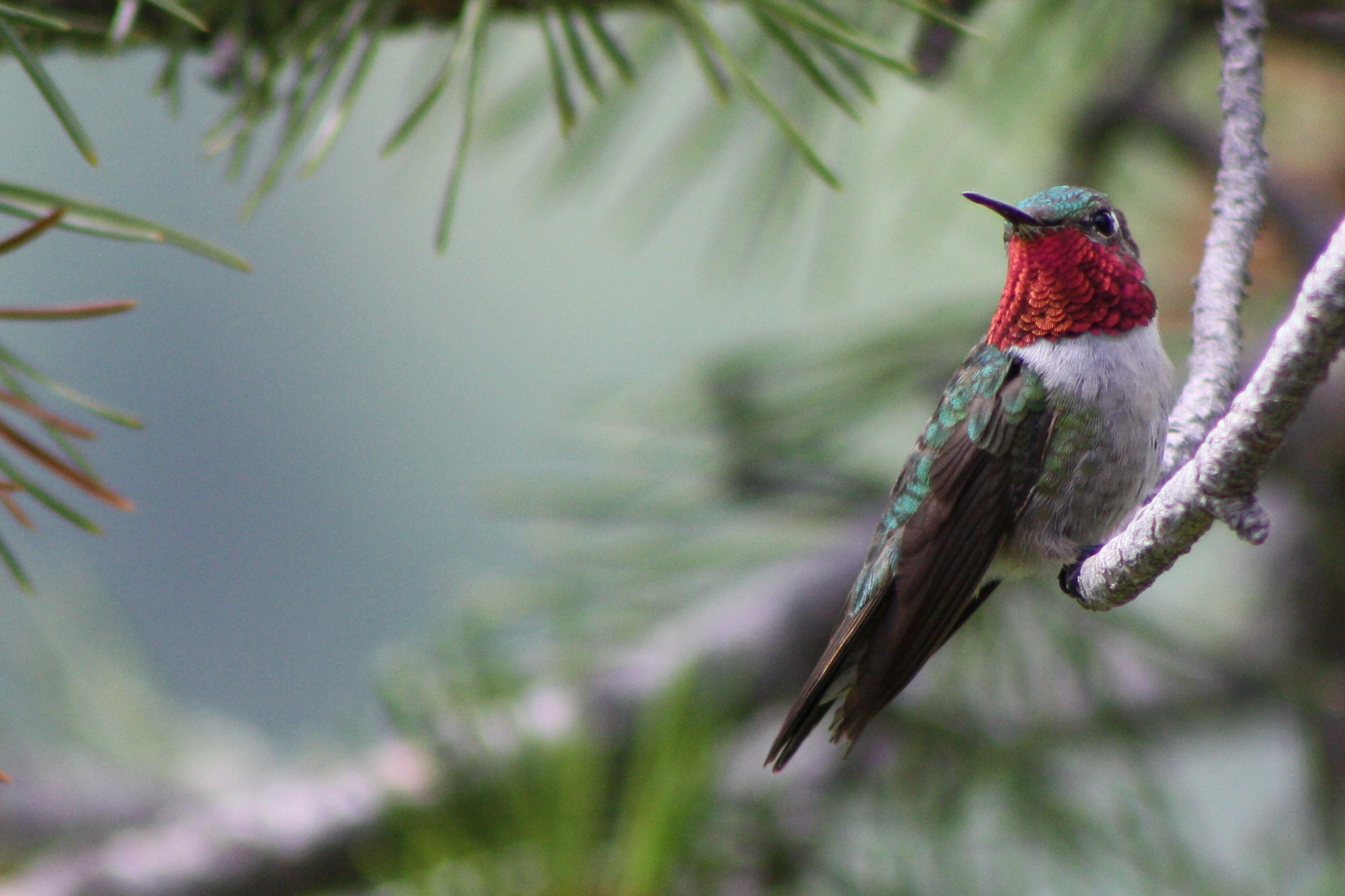
A male broad-tailed hummingbird, the most common type of hummingbird in Rocky Mountain National Park

Hummingbirds are small birds capable of hovering in mid-air due to the rapid flapping of their wings. They are the only birds that can fly backwards.

- Ruby-throated hummingbird, Archilochus colubris, montane forests (O)
- Black-chinned hummingbird, Archilochus alexandri, montane forests (R)
- Calliope hummingbird, Stellula calliope, montane and subalpine forests, meadows (R)
- Rufous hummingbird, Selasphorus rufus, montane and subalpine forests, meadows (U)
- Broad-tailed hummingbird, Selasphorus platycercus, montane and subalpine forests, meadows

== Cranes ==
Order: Gruiformes Family: Gruidae

Cranes are large, long-legged, and long-necked birds. Unlike the similar-looking but unrelated herons, cranes fly with necks outstretched, not pulled back. Most have elaborate and noisy courting displays or "dances".

- Sandhill crane, Antigone canadensis, marshes, meadows (R)

== Rails, gallinules, and coots ==
Order: Gruiformes Family: Rallidae

Rallidae is a large family of small to medium-sized birds which includes the rails, crakes, coots, and gallinules. The most typical family members occupy dense vegetation in damp environments near lakes, swamps, or rivers. In general they are shy and secretive birds, making them difficult to observe. Most species have strong legs and long toes which are well adapted to soft uneven surfaces. They tend to have short, rounded wings and to be weak fliers.

- Virginia rail, Rallus limicola, marshes (U)
- Sora, Porzana carolina, marshes (U)
- Common gallinule, Gallinula galeata, lakes, marshes (O)
- American coot, Fulica americana, lakes, marshes (U)

== Stilts and avocets ==
Order: Charadriiformes Family: Recurvirostridae

Recurvirostridae is a family of large wading birds which includes the avocets and stilts. The avocets have long legs and long up-curved bills. The stilts have extremely long legs and long, thin, straight bills.

- American avocet, Recurvirostra americana, lakes, marshes (R)

== Plovers and lapwings ==
Order: Charadriiformes Family: Charadriidae

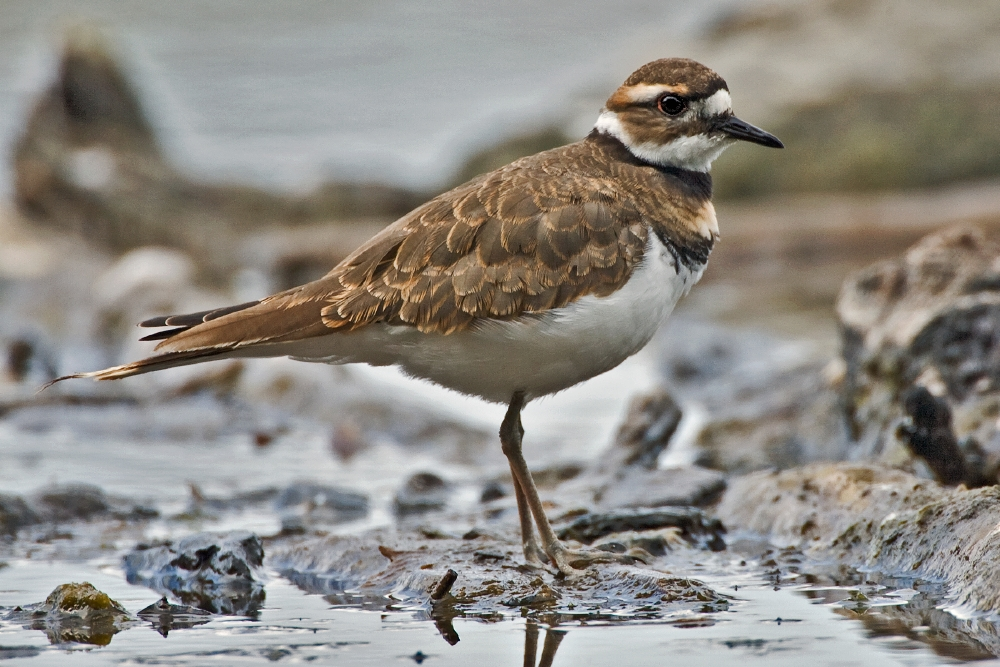
A killdeer

The family Charadriidae includes the plovers, dotterels, and lapwings. They are small to medium-sized birds with compact bodies, short thick necks, and long, usually pointed, wings. They are found in open country worldwide, mostly in habitats near water.

- Killdeer, Charadrius vociferus, lakes, marshes, sandbars, meadows (U)
- Semipalmated plover, Charadrius semipalmatus (H)

== Sandpipers and allies ==
Order: Charadriiformes Family: Scolopacidae

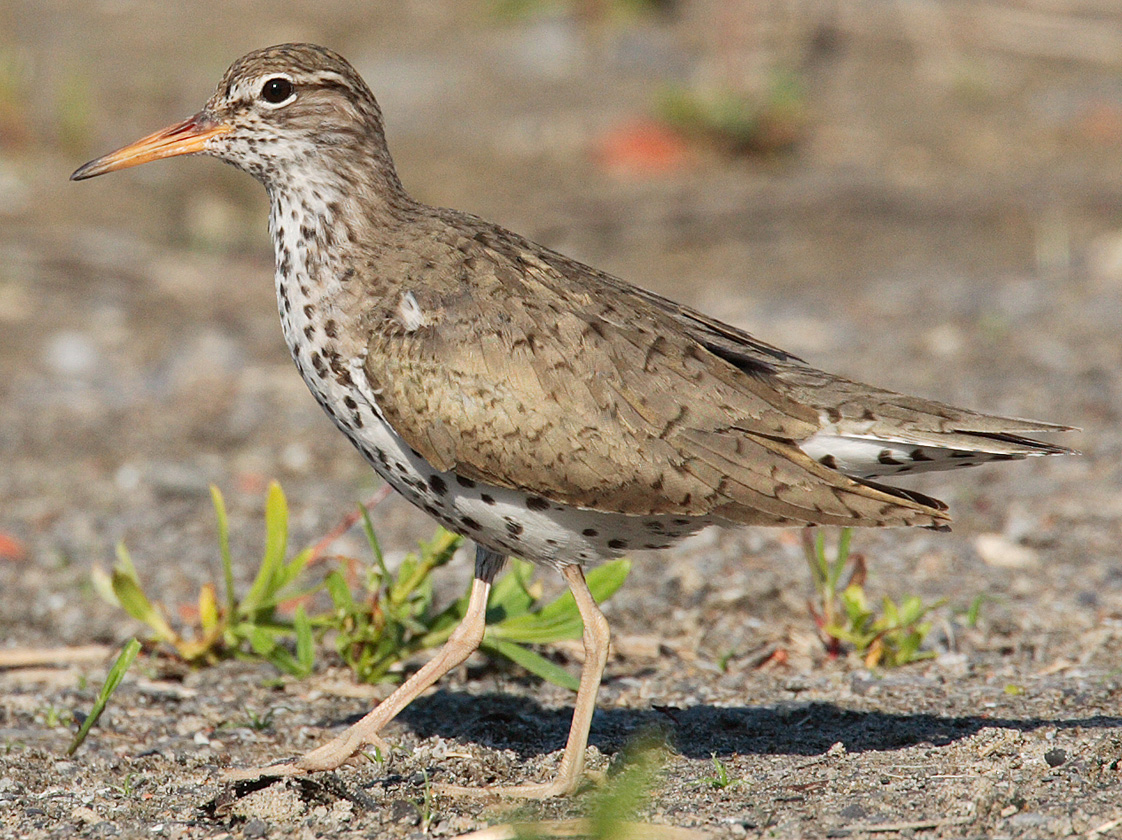
A spotted sandpiper

Scolopacidae is a large diverse family of small to medium-sized shorebirds including the sandpipers, curlews, godwits, shanks, tattlers, woodcocks, snipes, dowitchers, and phalaropes. The majority of these species eat small invertebrates picked out of the mud or soil. Different lengths of legs and bills enable multiple species to feed in the same habitat, particularly on the coast, without direct competition for food.

- Long-billed curlew, Numenius americanus, marshes, meadows (O)
- Marbled godwit, Limosa fedoa, marshes, meadows (O)
- Baird's sandpiper, Calidris bairdii, lakes, marshes (R)
- Least sandpiper, Calidris minutilla, lakes, marshes (R)
- Western sandpiper, Calidris mauri, lakes, marshes (R)
- Wilson's snipe, Gallinago delicata, lakes, marshes, meadows
- Spotted sandpiper, Actitis macularia, lakes, marshes, sandbars
- Solitary sandpiper, Tringa solitaria, lakes, marshes (R)
- Lesser yellowlegs, Tringa flavipes, lakes, marshes (R)
- Willet, Catoptrophorus semipalmatus, lakes, marshes, sandbars (R)
- Greater yellowlegs, Tringa melanoleuca, lakes, marshes (R)
- Wilson's phalarope, Phalaropus tricolor, lakes, marshes, rivers (R)
- Red-necked phalarope, Phalaropus lobatus, lakes, marshes (O)

== Skuas and jaegers ==
Order: Charadriiformes Family: Stercorariidae

Skuas and jaegers are in general medium to large birds, typically with gray or brown plumage, often with white markings on the wings. They have longish bills with hooked tips and webbed feet with sharp claws. They look like large dark gulls, but have a fleshy cere above the upper mandible. They are strong, acrobatic fliers.

- Pomarine jaeger, Stercorarius pomarinus (Unc)

== Gulls, terns, and skimmers ==
Order: Charadriiformes Family: Laridae

Laridae is a family of medium to large seabirds and includes gulls, terns, and skimmers. Gulls are typically gray or white, often with black markings on the head or wings. They have stout, longish bills and webbed feet. Terns are a group of generally medium to large seabirds typically with grey or white plumage, often with black markings on the head. Most terns hunt fish by diving but some pick insects off the surface of fresh water. Terns are generally long-lived birds, with several species known to live in excess of 30 years.

- Sabine's gull, Xema sabini (Unc)
- Bonaparte's gull, Larus philadelphia, lakes, marshes, rivers (R)
- Franklin's gull, Larus pipixcan, lakes, marshes, rivers (U)
- Ring-billed gull, Larus delawarensis, lakes, marshes, rivers (U)
- California gull, Larus californicus, lakes, marshes, rivers (U)
- Herring gull, Larus argentatus, lakes, marshes, rivers (R)
- Black tern, Chilidonias niger, lakes, marshes, rivers (O)
- Forster's tern, Sterna forsteri, lakes, marshes, rivers (R)

== Loons ==
Order: Gaviiformes Family: Gaviidae

Loons are aquatic birds, the size of a large duck, to which they are unrelated. Their plumage is largely gray or black, and they have spear-shaped bills. Loons swim well and fly adequately, but are almost hopeless on land, because their legs are placed towards the rear of the body.

- Pacific loon, Gavia pacifica (Unc)
- Common loon, Gavia immer, lakes (R)

== Ibises and spoonbills ==
Order: Pelecaniformes Family: Threskiornithidae

The family Threskiornithidae includes the ibises and spoonbills. They have long, broad wings. Their bodies tend to be elongated, the neck more so, with rather long legs. The bill is also long, decurved in the case of the ibises, straight and distinctively flattened in the spoonbills.

- White-faced ibis, Plegadis chihi, lakes, marshes (U)

== Pelicans ==
Order: Pelecaniformes Family: Pelecanidae

Pelicans are very large water birds with a distinctive pouch under their beak. Their feet have four webbed toes.

- American white pelican, Pelecanus erythrorhynchos, lakes, rivers, marshes (U)

== Herons, egrets, and bitterns ==
Order: Pelecaniformes Family: Ardeidae

The family Ardeidae contains the herons, egrets, and bitterns. Herons and egrets are medium to large wading birds with long necks and legs. Bitterns tend to be shorter necked and more secretive. Members of Ardeidae fly with their necks retracted, unlike other long-necked birds such as storks, ibises, and spoonbills.

- American bittern, Botaurus lentiginosus, marshes (R)
- Least bittern, Ixobrychus exilis, marshes (R)
- Great blue heron, Ardea herodias, lakes, rivers, marshes (U)
- Snowy egret, Egretta thula, lakes, rivers, marshes (R)
- Black-crowned night-heron, Nycticorax nycticorax, marshes (R)

== New World vultures ==
Order: Cathartiformes Family: Cathartidae

The New World vultures are not closely related to Old World vultures, but superficially resemble them because of convergent evolution. Like the Old World vultures, they are scavengers. However, unlike Old World vultures, which find carcasses by sight, New World vultures have a good sense of smell with which they locate carcasses.

- Turkey vulture, Cathartes aura, montane forests, meadows

== Osprey ==
Order: Accipitriformes Family: Pandionidae

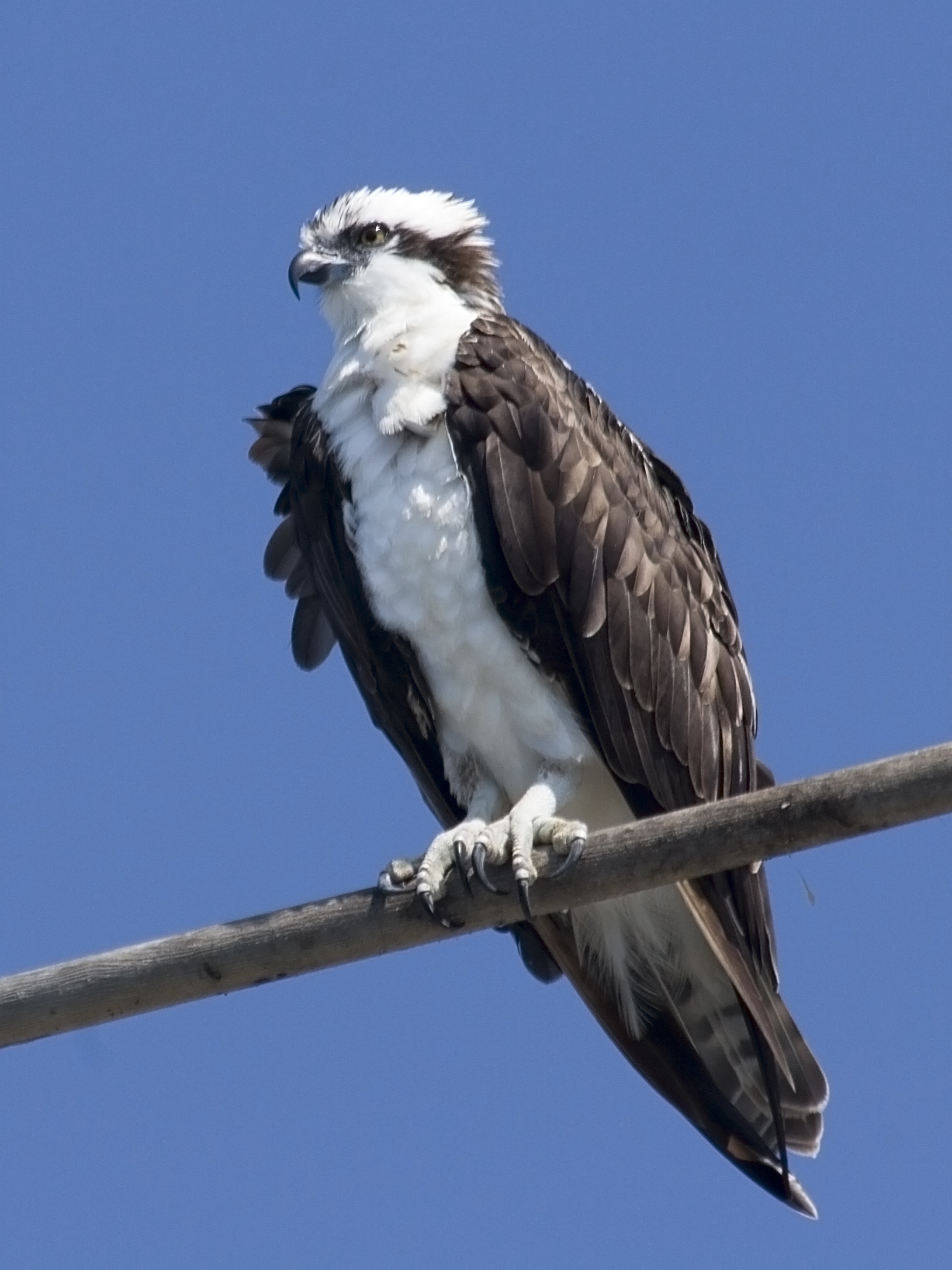
An osprey, more common on the west side of the park.

Pandionidae is a monotypic family of fish-eating birds of prey. Its single species possesses a very large and powerful hooked beak, strong legs, strong talons, and keen eyesight.

- Osprey, Pandion haliaetus, lakes, marshes, rivers (U)

== Hawks, eagles, and kites ==
Order: Accipitriformes Family: Accipitridae

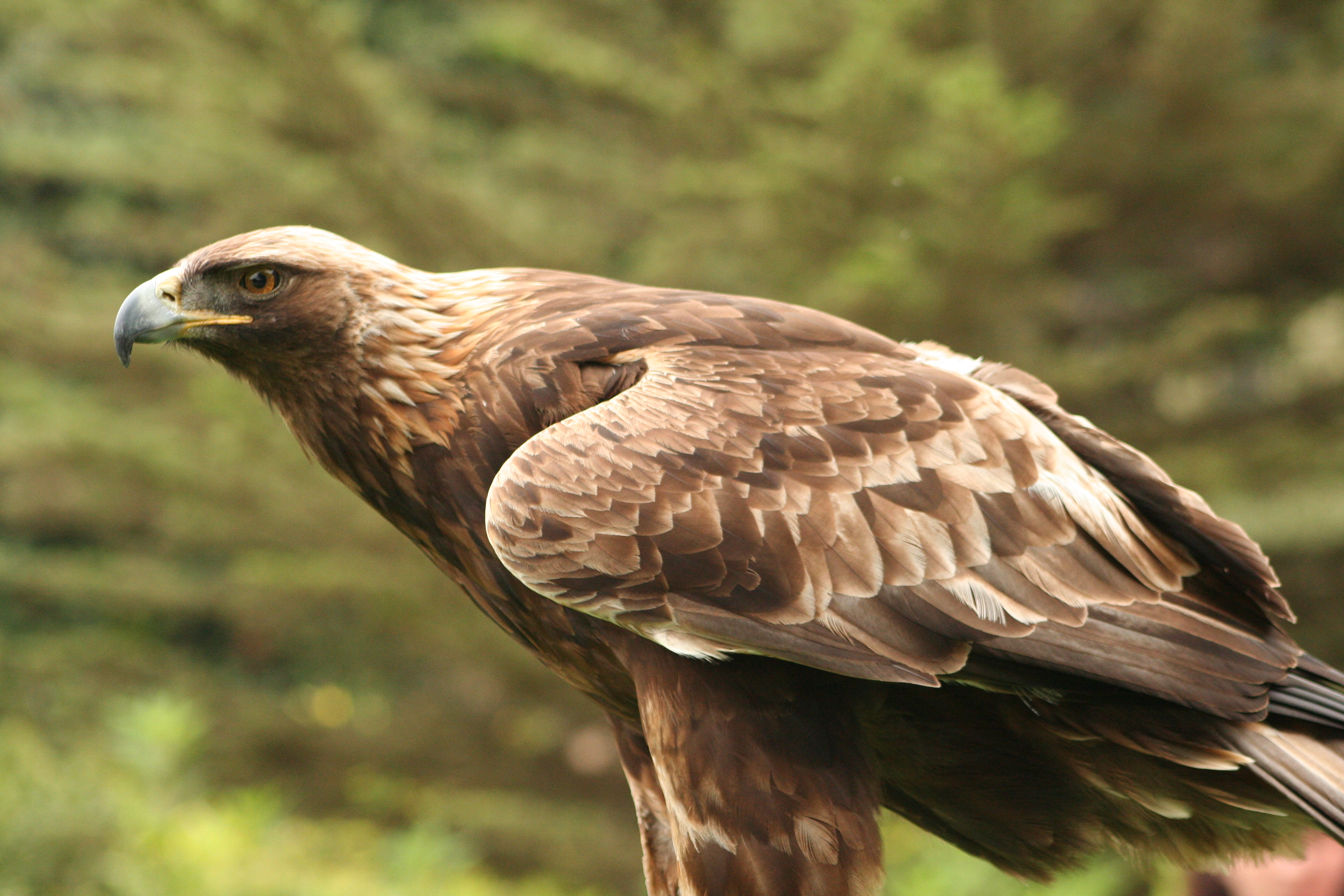
A golden eagle

Accipitridae is a family of birds of prey which includes hawks, eagles, kites, harriers, and Old World vultures. These birds have very large powerful hooked beaks for tearing flesh from their prey, strong legs, powerful talons, and keen eyesight.

- Golden eagle, Aquila chrysaetos, cliffs, rocky areas, alpine tundra
- Sharp-shinned hawk, Accipiter striatus, montane forests (U)
- Cooper's hawk, Astur cooperi, montane and subalpine forests
- American goshawk, Astur atricapillus, montane and subalpine forests
- Northern harrier, Circus cyaneus, marshes, meadows (U)
- Bald eagle, Haliaeetus leucocephalus, lakes, montane and subalpine forests (U)
- Broad-winged hawk, Buteo platypterus, montane forests, meadows (R)
- Swainson's hawk, Buteo swainsoni, montane forests, meadows (U)
- Red-tailed hawk, Buteo jamaicensis, cliffs, montane forests, meadows
  - "Harlan's" hawk, Buteo jamaicensis harlani, montane forests, meadows (R)
  - "Krider's" hawk, Buteo jamaicensis kriderii, montane forests, meadows (O)
- Rough-legged hawk, Buteo lagopus, montane forests, meadows (U)
- Ferruginous hawk, Buteo regalis, montane forests, meadows (R)

== Owls ==
Order: Strigiformes Family: Strigidae

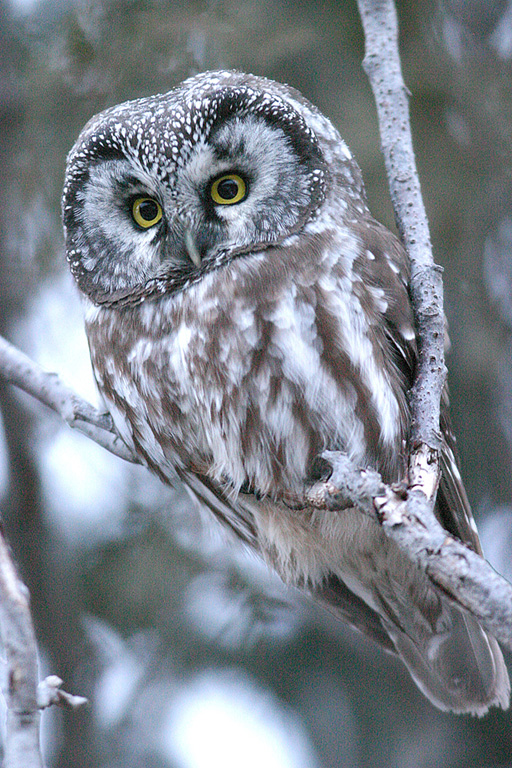
A boreal owl

Typical or "true" owls are small to large solitary nocturnal birds of prey. They have large forward-facing eyes and ears, a hawk-like beak, and a conspicuous circle of feathers around each eye called a facial disk.

- Flammulated owl, Psiloscops flammeolus, old-growth ponderosa pine forests (R)
- Eastern screech-owl, Megascops asio, montane forests, riparian (U)
- Great horned owl, Bubo virginianus, montane and subalpine forests, riparian
- Northern pygmy-owl, Glaucidium gnoma, montane and subalpine forests, riparian
- Long-eared owl, Asio otus, montane forests, riparian (U)
- Boreal owl, Aegolius funereus, subalpine forests (U)
- Northern saw-whet owl, Aegolius acadicus, montane and subalpine forests (U)

== Kingfishers ==
Order: Coraciiformes Family: Alcedinidae

Kingfishers are medium-sized birds with large heads, long, pointed bills, short legs, and stubby tails.

- Belted kingfisher, Ceryle alcyon, lakes, marshes, rivers (U)

== Woodpeckers ==
Order: Piciformes Family: Picidae

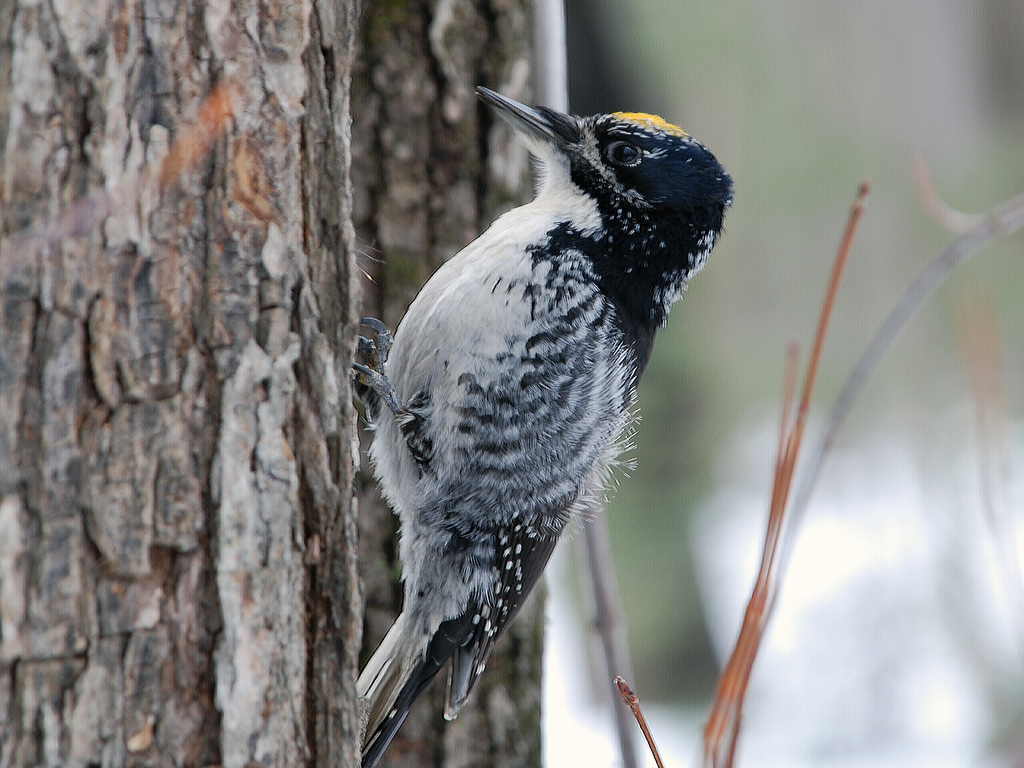
An American three-toed woodpecker, which have increased in the park due to pine bark beetles.

Woodpeckers are small to medium-sized birds with chisel-like beaks, short legs, stiff tails, and long tongues used for capturing insects. Some species have feet with two toes pointing forward and two backward, while several species have only three toes. Many woodpeckers have the habit of tapping noisily on tree trunks with their beaks.

- Lewis's woodpecker, Melanerpes lewis, montane forests (R)
- Red-headed woodpecker, Melanerpes erythrocephalus, riparian (R)
- Williamson's sapsucker, Sphyrapicus thyroideus, montane coniferous forests, riparian
- Red-naped sapsucker, Sphyrapicus nuchalis, montane and subalpine forests, riparian
- American three-toed woodpecker, Picoides tridactylus, montane and subalpine forests (U)
- Downy woodpecker, Dryobates pubescens, montane and subalpine forests, riparian (U)
- Hairy woodpecker, Dryobates villosus, montane and subalpine forests, riparian
- Northern flicker, Colaptes auratus, montane and subalpine forests, riparian

== Falcons and caracaras ==
Order: Falconiformes Family: Falconidae

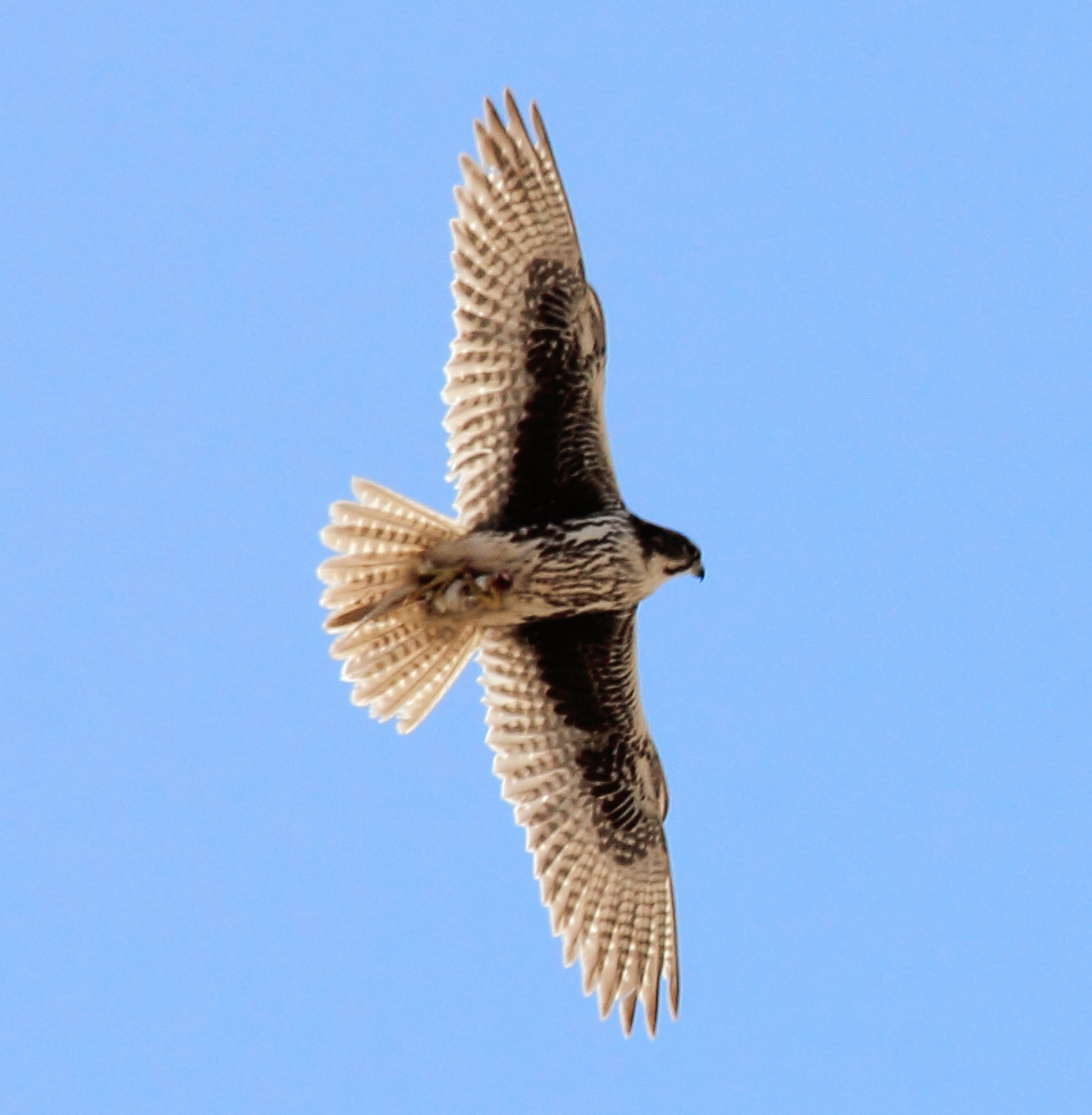
A prairie falcon

Falconidae is a family of diurnal birds of prey, notably the falcons and caracaras. They differ from hawks, eagles, and kites in that they kill with their beaks instead of their talons.

- American kestrel, Falco sparverius, montane forests, meadows (U)
- Merlin, Falco columbarius, montane forests, meadows (R)
- Peregrine falcon, Falco peregrinus, cliffs, rocky areas, alpine tundra, meadows (R)
- Prairie falcon, Falco mexicanus, cliffs, rocky areas, alpine tundra, meadows (U)

== Tyrant flycatchers ==
Order: Passeriformes Family: Tyrannidae

Tyrant flycatchers are Passerine birds which occur throughout North and South America. They superficially resemble the Old World flycatchers, but are more robust and have stronger bills. They do not have the sophisticated vocal capabilities of the songbirds. Most, but not all, are rather plain. As the name implies, most are insectivorous.

- Ash-throated flycatcher, Myiarchus cinerascens, montane forests, riparian (O)
- Western kingbird, Tyrannus verticalis, montane forests, riparian (U)
- Eastern kingbird, Tyrannus tyrannus, montane forests, riparian (R)
- Olive-sided flycatcher, Contopus borealis, coniferous forests (U)
- Western wood-pewee, Contopus sordidulus, montane and subalpine forests, riparian
- Willow flycatcher, Empodinax traillii, montane and subalpine forests, riparian (O)
- Least flycatcher, Empodinax minimus, montane forests, riparian (R)
- Hammond's flycatcher, Empodinax hammondii, montane and subalpine forests, riparian (U)
- Dusky flycatcher, Empodinax oberholseri, montane and subalpine forests, riparian
- Western flycatcher, Empodinax difficilis, montane and subalpine forests, riparian (U)
- Black phoebe, Sayornis nigricans, montane forests, riparian (Unc)
- Say's phoebe, Sayornis saya, montane forests, riparian, aspen groves (U)

== Vireos, shrike-babblers, and erpornis ==
Order: Passeriformes Family: Vireonidae

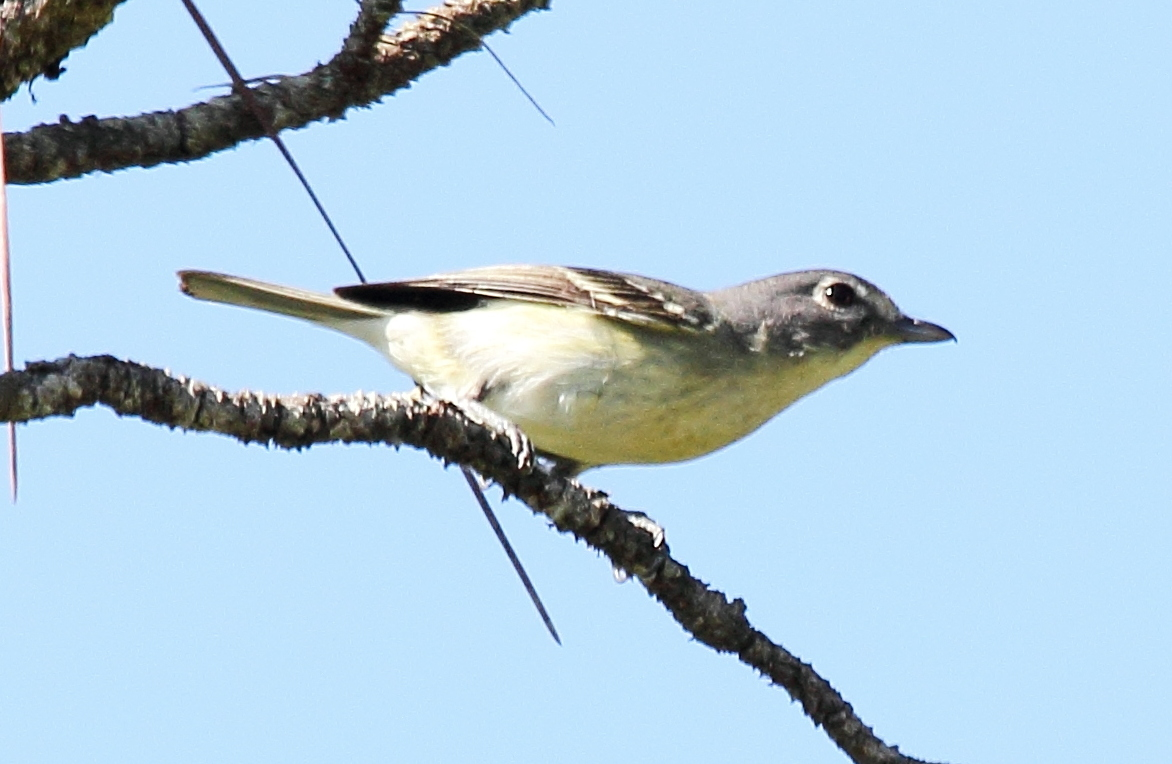
A plumbeous vireo

The vireos are a group of small to medium-sized passerine birds restricted to the New World, though a few other species in the family are found in Asia. They are typically greenish in color and resemble wood-warblers apart from their heavier bills.

- White-eyed vireo, Vireo griseus, riparian (O)
- Cassin's vireo, Vireo cassinii, riparian (O)
- Plumbeous vireo, Vireo plumbeus, montane and subalpine forests, riparian (U)
- Warbling vireo, Vireo gilvus, deciduous forests, riparian
- Red-eyed vireo, Vireo olivaceous, riparian (O)

== Shrikes ==
Order: Passeriformes Family: Laniidae

Shrikes are passerine birds known for their habit of catching other birds and small animals and impaling the uneaten portions of their bodies on thorns. A shrike's beak is hooked, like that of a typical bird of prey.

- Loggerhead shrike, Lanius ludovicianus, montane forests, riparian, meadows (R)
- Northern shrike, Lanius borealis, montane forests, riparian, meadows (U)

== Crows, jays, and magpies ==
Order: Passeriformes Family: Corvidae

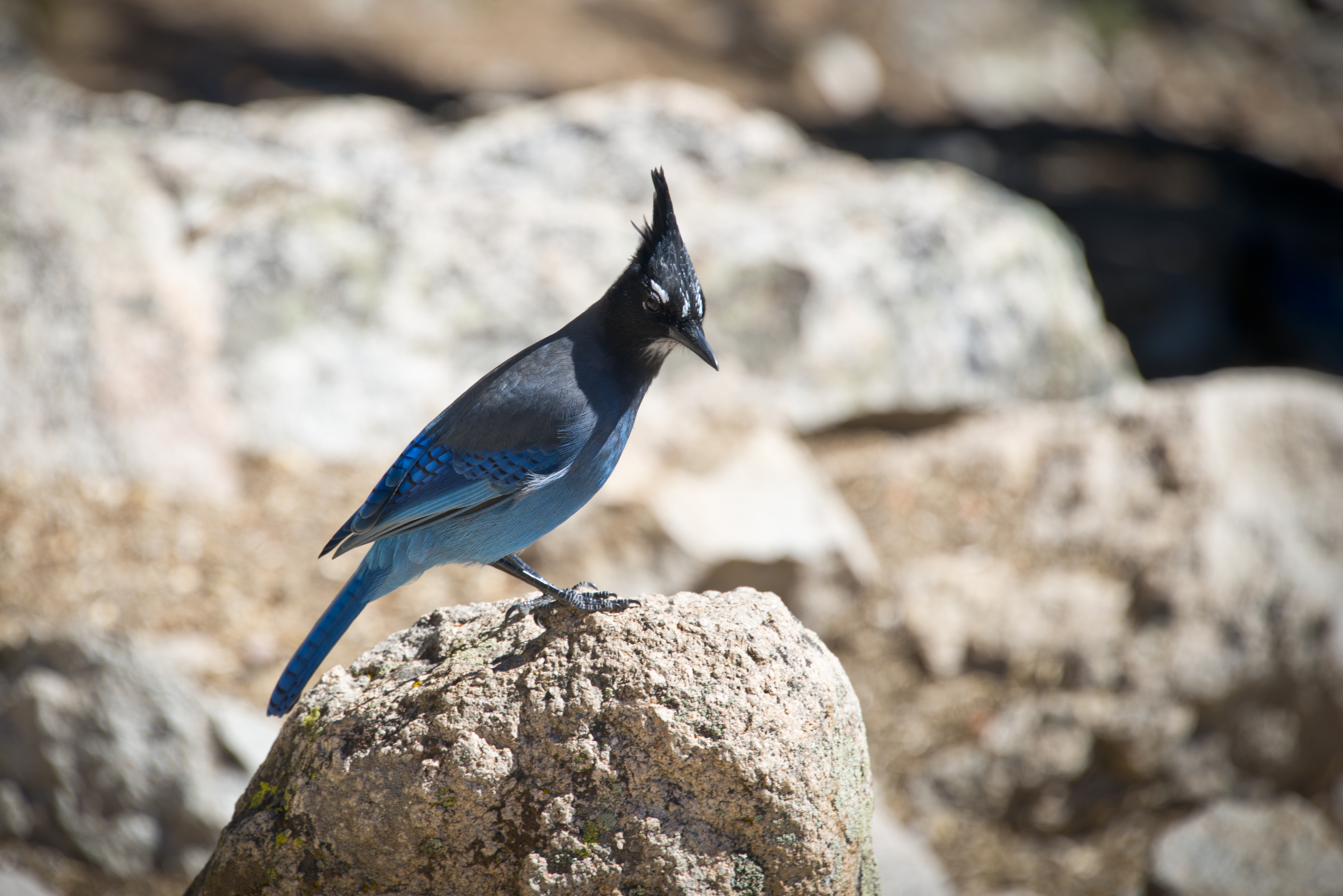
A Steller's jay

The family Corvidae includes crows, ravens, jays, choughs, magpies, treepies, nutcrackers, and ground jays. Corvids are above average in size among the Passeriformes, and some of the larger species show high levels of intelligence.

- Canada jay, Perisoreus canadensis, coniferous forest
- Pinyon jay, Gymnorhinus cyanocephalus, montane forest (O)
- Steller's jay, Cyanocitta stelleri, montane and subalpine forest
- Blue jay, Cyanocitta cristata, montane forest, riparian (O)
- Woodhouse's scrub-jay, Aphelocoma woodhouseii (O)
- Clark's nutcracker, Nucifraga columbiana, coniferous forest
- Black-billed magpie, Pica pica, montane forest, meadows
- American crow, Corvus brachyrhynchos, montane and subalpine forests, meadows
- Common raven, Corvus corax, montane and subalpine forests, cliffs, rocky areas, alpine tundra, meadows

== Tits, chickadees, and titmice ==
Order: Passeriformes Family: Paridae

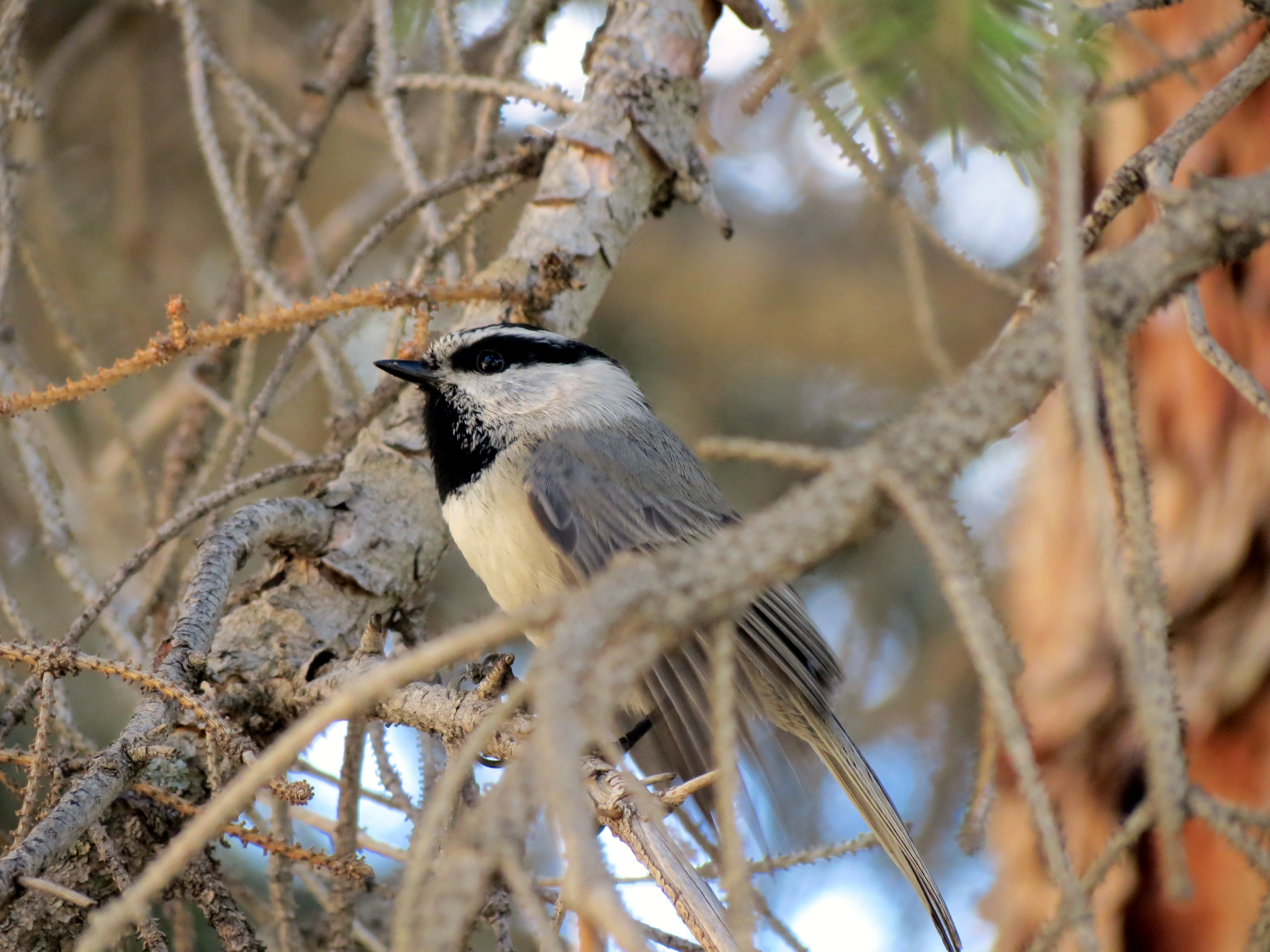
A mountain chickadee, the park's most common species of chickadee

The Paridae are mainly small stocky woodland species with short stout bills. Some have crests. They are adaptable birds, with a mixed diet including seeds and insects.

- Black-capped chickadee, Poecile atricapillus, montane and subalpine forests, riparian
- Mountain chickadee, Poecile gambeli, montane and subalpine forests, riparian
- Juniper titmouse, Parus inornatus, montane forest (Unc)

== Larks ==
Order: Passeriformes Family: Alaudidae

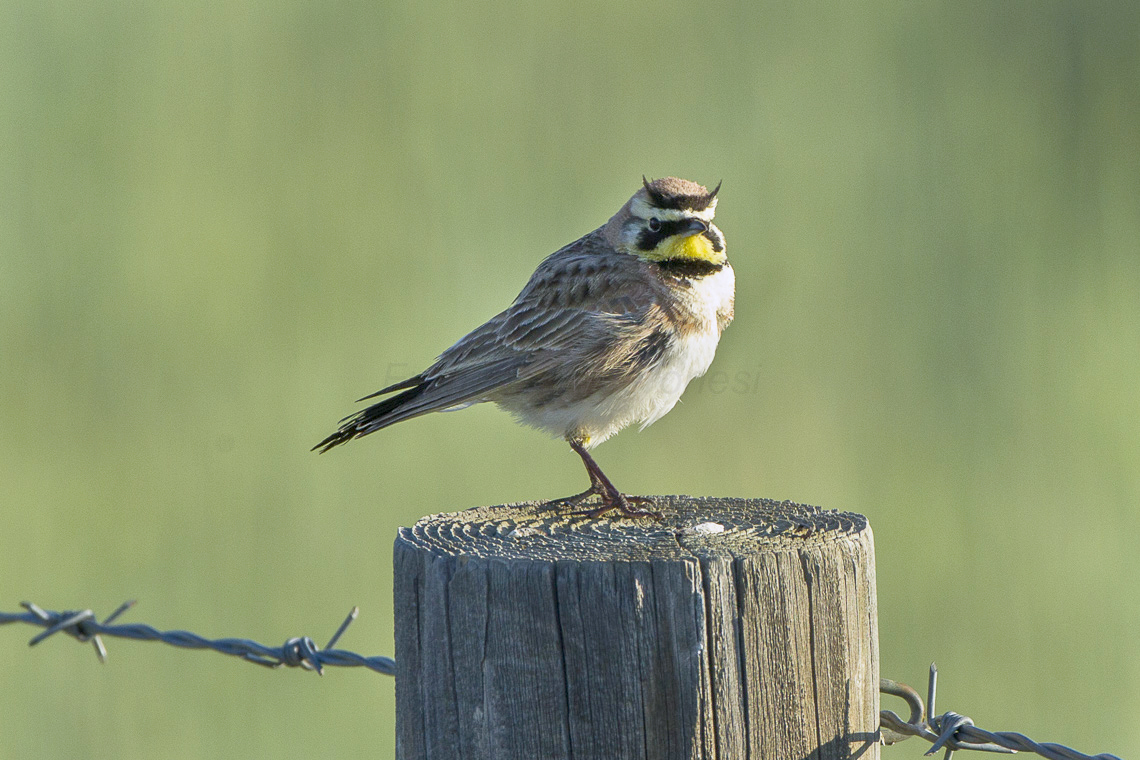
A horned lark

Larks are small terrestrial birds with often extravagant songs and display flights. Most larks are fairly dull in appearance. Their food is insects and seeds.

- Horned lark, Eremophila alpestris, alpine tundra, meadows

== Swallows ==
Order: Passeriformes Family: Hirundinidae

The family Hirundinidae is adapted to aerial feeding. They have a slender streamlined body, long pointed wings, and a short bill with a wide gape. The feet are adapted to perching rather than walking, and the front toes are partially joined at the base.

- Tree swallow, Tachycineta bicolor, montane forests, lakes, marshes, meadows
- Violet-green swallow, Tachycineta thalassina, montane and subalpine forests, lakes, marshes, meadows
- Northern rough-winged swallow, Stelgidopteryx serripennis, lakes, marshes, meadows (R)
- Barn swallow, Hirundo rustica, lakes, marshes (U)
- Cliff swallow, Hirundo pyrrhonota, lakes, marshes, rocky areas (U)

== Long-tailed tits ==
Order: Passeriformes Family: Aegithalidae

The long-tailed tits are a family of small passerine birds with medium to long tails. They make woven bag nests in trees. Most eat a mixed diet which includes insects.

- Bushtit, Psaltriparus minimus (O)

== Kinglets ==
Order: Passeriformes Family: Regulidae

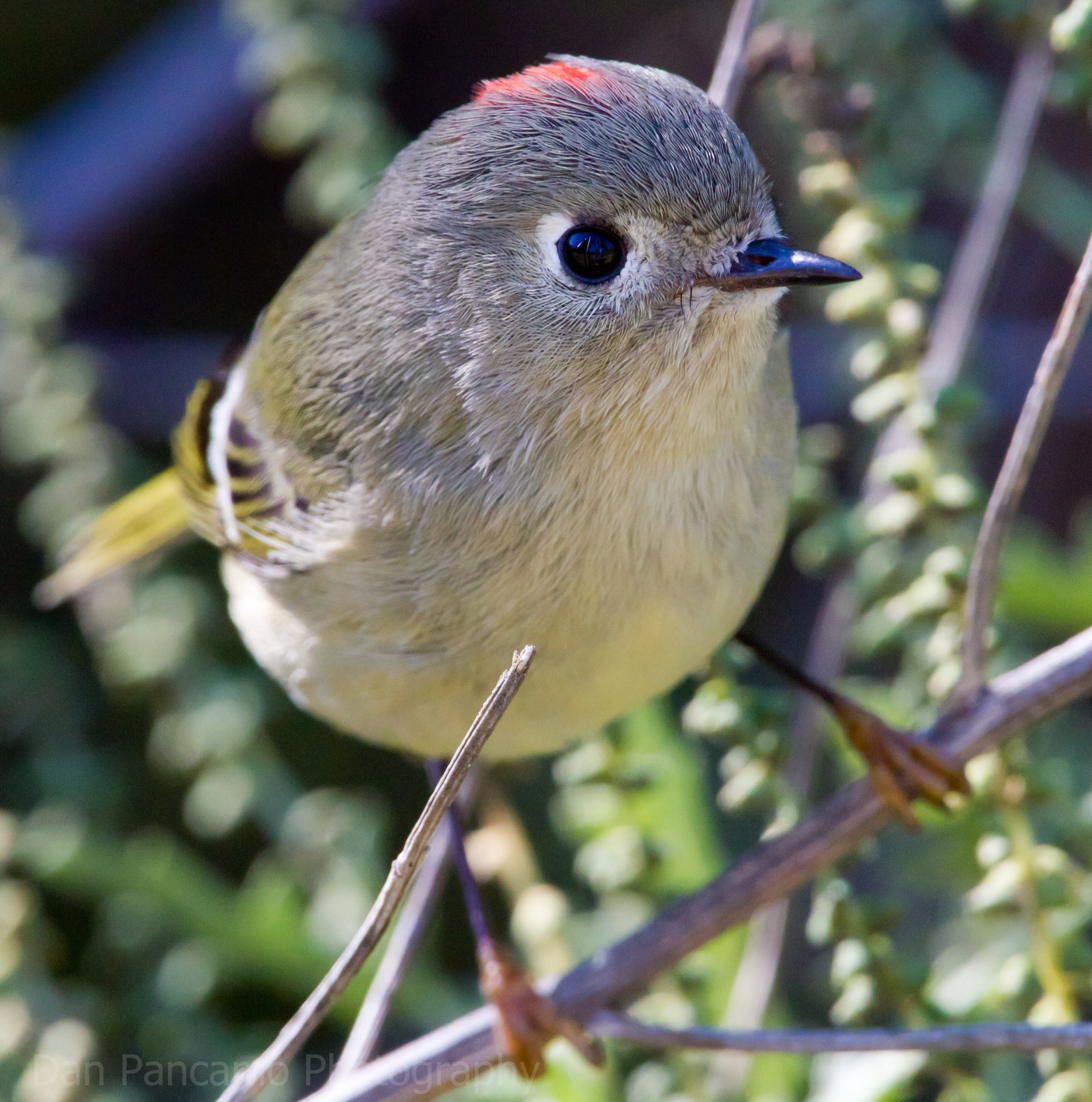
A ruby-crowned kinglet in the park's high-elevation forests.

The kinglets and "crests" are a small family of birds which resemble some warblers. They are very small insectivorous birds, mostly in the genus Regulus. The adults have colored crowns, giving rise to their name.

- Ruby-crowned kinglet, Corthylio calendula, montane and subalpine forests, riparian
- Golden-crowned kinglet, Regulus satrapa, montane and subalpine forests, riparian (U)

== Waxwings ==
Order: Passeriformes Family: Bombycillidae

The waxwings are a group of passerine birds with soft silky plumage and unique red tips to some of the wing feathers. In the Bohemian and cedar waxwings, these tips look like sealing wax and give the group its name. These are arboreal birds of northern forests. They live on insects in summer and berries in winter.

- Bohemian waxwing, Bombycilla garrulus, aspen groves, riparian (U)
- Cedar waxwing, Bombycilla cedrorum, aspen groves, riparian (U)

== Nuthatches ==
Order: Passeriformes Family: Sittidae

Nuthatches are small woodland birds. They have the unusual ability to climb down trees head first, unlike other birds which can only go upwards. Nuthatches have big heads, short tails, and powerful bills and feet.

- Red-breasted nuthatch, Sitta canadensis, coniferous forests
- White-breasted nuthatch, Sitta carolinensis, montane forests, riparian (U)
- Pygmy nuthatch, Sitta pygmaea, ponderosa pine forests

== Treecreepers ==
Order: Passeriformes Family: Certhiidae

Treecreepers are small woodland birds, brown above and white below. They have thin pointed down-curved bills, which they use to extricate insects from bark. They have stiff tail feathers, like woodpeckers, which they use to support themselves on vertical trees.

- Brown creeper, Certhia americana, coniferous forests

== Gnatcatchers ==
Order: Passeriformes Family: Polioptilidae

These dainty birds resemble Old World warblers in their structure and habits, moving restlessly through the foliage seeking insects. The gnatcatchers are mainly soft bluish gray in color and have the typical insectivore's long sharp bill. Many species have distinctive black head patterns (especially males) and long, regularly cocked, black-and-white tails.

- Blue-gray gnatcatcher, Polioptila caerulea, montane forests, riparian (R)

== Wrens ==
Order: Passeriformes Family: Troglodytidae

Wrens are small and inconspicuous birds, except for their loud songs. They have short wings and thin down-turned bills. Several species often hold their tails upright. All are insectivorous.

- Rock wren, Salpinctes obsoletus, rocky areas, alpine tundra, meadows (U)
- Canyon wren, Catherpes mexicanus, cliffs, rocky areas, canyons (R)
- Bewick's wren, Thryomanes bewickii, riparian, meadows (O)
- Northern house wren, Troglodytes aedon, montane and subalpine forests, riparian, meadows
- Pacific wren, Troglodytes pacificus (R)
- Winter wren, Troglodytes hiemalis, montane forests, riparian (O)
- Marsh wren, Cisthorus palustris, lakes, marshes (Unc)

== Mockingbirds and thrashers ==
Order: Passeriformes Family: Mimidae

The mimids are a family of passerine birds which includes thrashers, mockingbirds, tremblers, and the New World catbirds. These birds are notable for their vocalization, especially their remarkable ability to mimic a wide variety of birds and other sounds heard outdoors. The species tend towards dull grays and browns in their appearance.

- Gray catbird, Dumetella carolinensis, montane forests, riparian (R)
- Brown thrasher, Toxostoma rufum, riparian, meadows (R)
- Sage thrasher, Oreoscoptes montanus, montane forests, meadows (U)
- Northern mockingbird, Mimus polyglottos, riparian (R)

== Starlings ==
Order: Passeriformes Family: Sturnidae

Starlings and mynas are small to medium-sized Old World passerine birds with strong feet. Their flight is strong and direct and most are very gregarious. Their preferred habitat is fairly open country, and they eat insects and fruit. The plumage of several species is dark with a metallic sheen.

- European starling, Sturnus vulgaris, developed areas (U) (I)

== Dippers ==
Order: Passeriformes Family: Cinclidae

Dippers are a group of perching birds whose habitat includes aquatic environments in the Americas, Europe, and Asia. They are named for their bobbing or dipping movements. These birds have adaptations which allows them to submerge and walk on the bottom to feed on insect larvae.

- American dipper, Cinclus mexicanus, rivers, waterfalls (U)

== Thrushes and allies ==
Order: Passeriformes Family: Turdidae

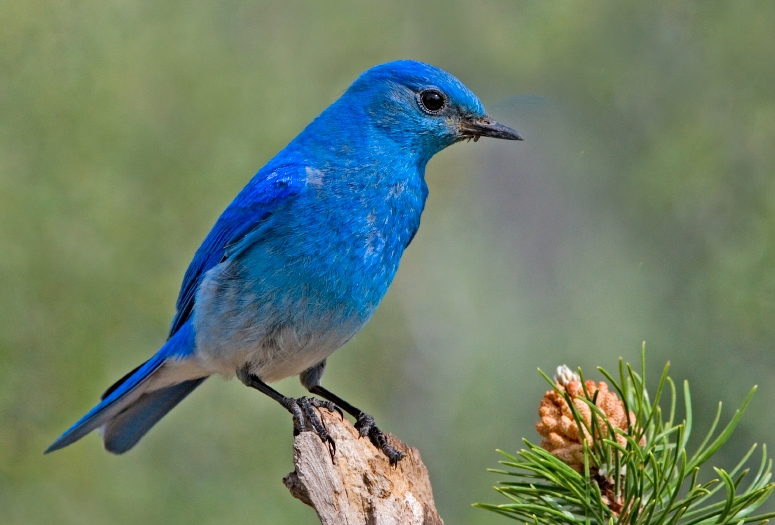
A mountain bluebird

The thrushes are a group of passerine birds that occur mainly but not exclusively in the Old World. They are plump, soft plumaged, small to medium-sized insectivores or sometimes omnivores, often feeding on the ground. Many have attractive songs.

- Eastern bluebird, Sialia sialis, montane forests, riparian (R)
- Western bluebird, Sialia mexicana, montane forests, meadows (U)
- Mountain bluebird, Sialia currucoides, montane forests, meadows
- Townsend's solitaire, Myadestes townsedi, montane and subalpine forests, riparian
- Veery, Catharus fuscescens, montane forests, riparian (R)
- Swainson's thrush, Catharus ustulatus, montane and subalpine forests, riparian (U)
- Hermit thrush, Catharus guttatus, montane and subalpine forests, riparian
- Wood thrush, Hylocichla mustelina, riparian (O)
- American robin, Turdus migratorius, montane and subalpine forests, riparian, meadows
- Varied thrush, Ixoreus naevius, montane forests, riparian (O)

== Old world sparrows ==
Order: Passeriformes Family: Passeridae

Old World sparrows are small passerine birds. In general, sparrows tend to be small plump brownish or grayish birds with short tails and short powerful beaks. Sparrows are seed eaters, but they also consume small insects.

- House sparrow, Passer domesticus, developed areas (U) (I)

== Wagtails and pipits ==
Order: Passeriformes Family: Motacillidae

Motacillidae is a family of small passerine birds with medium to long tails. They include the wagtails, longclaws, and pipits. They are slender ground-feeding insectivores of open country.

- American pipit, Anthus rubescens, alpine tundra, meadows
- Sprague's pipit, Anthus spragueii, meadows (Unc)

== Finches, euphonias, and allies ==
Order: Passeriformes Family: Fringillidae

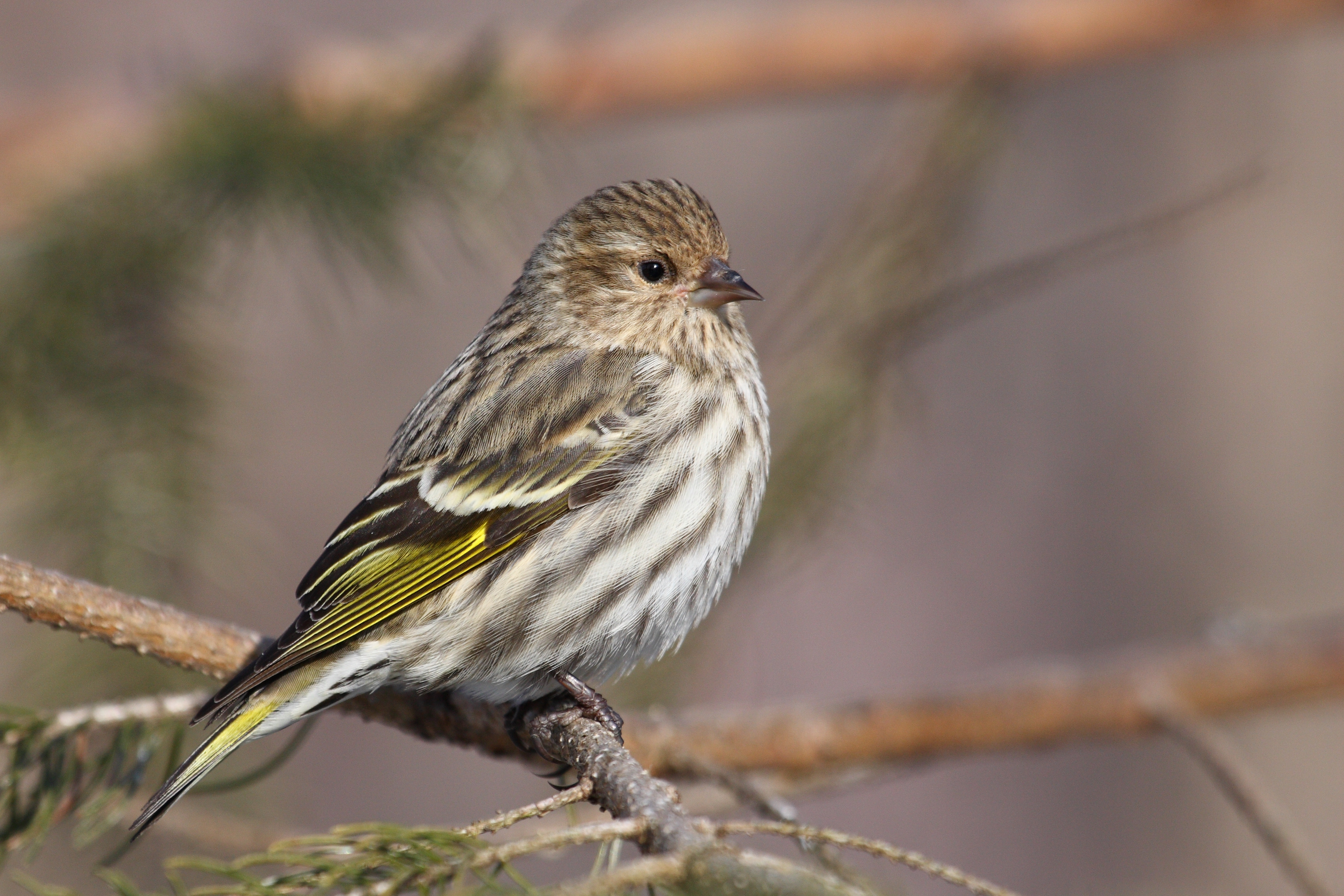
A pine siskin

- Evening grosbeak, Coccothraustes vespertinus, montane and subalpine forests (U)
- Pine grosbeak, Pinicola enucleator, coniferous forests (U)
- Gray-crowned rosy-finch, Leucosticte tephrocotis, montane and subalpine forests, meadows (U)
- Black rosy-finch, Leucosticte atrata, montane and subalpine forests, meadows (R)
- Brown-capped rosy-finch, Leucosticte australis, montane and subalpine forests, alpine tundra, meadows (U)
- House finch, Carpodacus mexicanus, montane and subalpine forests, riparian
- Cassin's finch, Carpodacus cassinii, montane and subalpine forests
- Redpoll, Carduelis flammea, montane forests, meadows (O)
- Red crossbill, Loxia curvirostra, coniferous forests
- White-winged crossbill, Loxia leucoptera, coniferous forests (R)
- Pine siskin, Spinus pinus, montane and subalpine forests, meadows
- Lesser goldfinch, Spinus psaltria, montane forests, riparian (R)
- American goldfinch, Spinus tristis, montane forests, riparian (U)

== Longspurs and snow buntings ==
Order: Passeriformes Family: Calcariidae

The Calcariidae are a group of passerine birds that had been traditionally grouped with the New World sparrows, but differ in a number of respects and are usually found in open grassy areas.

- Thick-billed longspur, Rhynchophanes mccownii, meadows (O)

== New World sparrows ==
Order: Passeriformes Family: Passerellidae

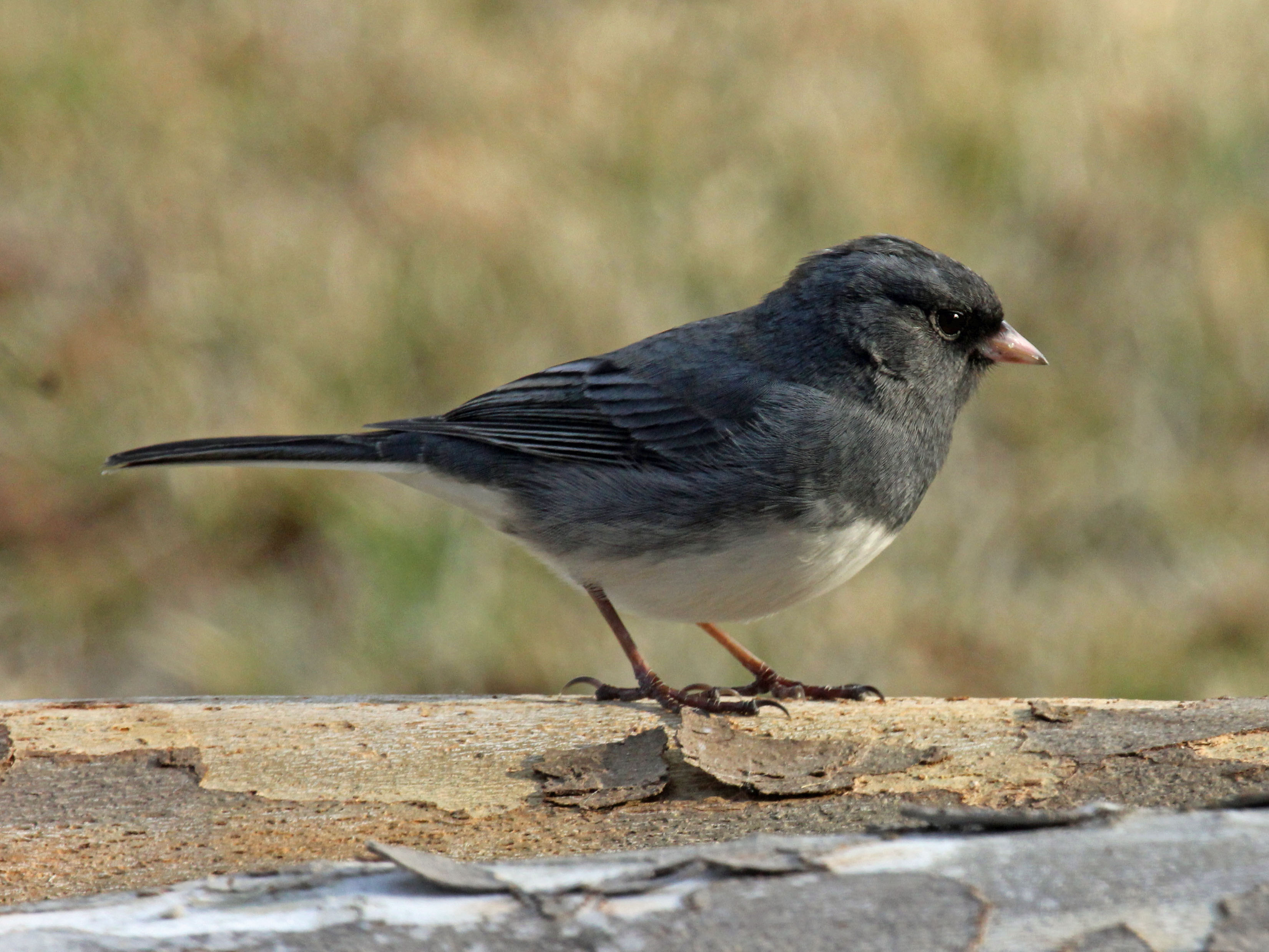
A dark-eyed junco

Until 2017, these species were considered part of the family Emberizidae. Most of the species are known as sparrows, but these birds are not closely related to the Old World sparrows which are in the family Passeridae. Many of these have distinctive head patterns.

- Black-throated sparrow, Amphispiza bilineata, meadows (O)
- Lark sparrow, Chondestes grammacus (R)
- Lark bunting, Calamospiza melanocorys, meadows (R)
- Chipping sparrow, Spizella passerina, montane and subalpine forests, meadows
- Clay-colored sparrow, Spizella pallida, meadows (O)
- Brewer's sparrow, Spizella breweri, meadows (U)
- Fox sparrow, Passerina iliaca, montane and subalpine forests, marshes, riparian, meadows (U)
- American tree sparrow, Spizelloides arborea, montane forests, riparian (R)
- Dark-eyed junco, Junco hyemalis, montane and subalpine forests, meadows
  - "Gray-headed" junco, Junco hyemalis caniceps, montane and subalpine forests, meadows
  - "Pink-sided" junco, Junco hyemalis mearnsi, montane and subalpine forests, meadows (R)
  - "Oregon" junco, Junco hyemalis shufeltdi, montane and subalpine forests, meadows (U)
  - "White-winged" junco, Junco hyemalis aikeni (Unc)
- White-crowned sparrow, Zonotrichia leucophrys, montane and subalpine forests, alpine tundra, meadows
- Harris's sparrow, Zonotrichia querula, montane forests, meadows (O)
- Sagebrush sparrow, Amphispiza nevadensis, meadows (R)
- Vesper sparrow, Pooecetes gramineus, meadows (U)
- Savannah sparrow, Passerculus sandwichensis, marshes, riparian, meadows (U)
- Song sparrow, Melospiza melodia, montane forest, riparian, meadows common
- Lincoln's sparrow, Melospiza lincolnii, montane and subalpine forests, meadows
- Green-tailed towhee, Pipilo chlorurus, montane forests, meadows
- Spotted towhee, Pipilo maculatus, montane forests, meadows (R)

== Yellow-breasted chat ==
Order: Passeriformes Family: Icteriidae

This species was historically placed in the wood-warblers (Parulidae) but nonetheless most authorities were unsure if it belonged there. It was placed in its own family in 2017.

- Yellow-breasted chat, Icteria virens (O)

== Troupials and allies ==
Order: Passeriformes Family: Icteridae

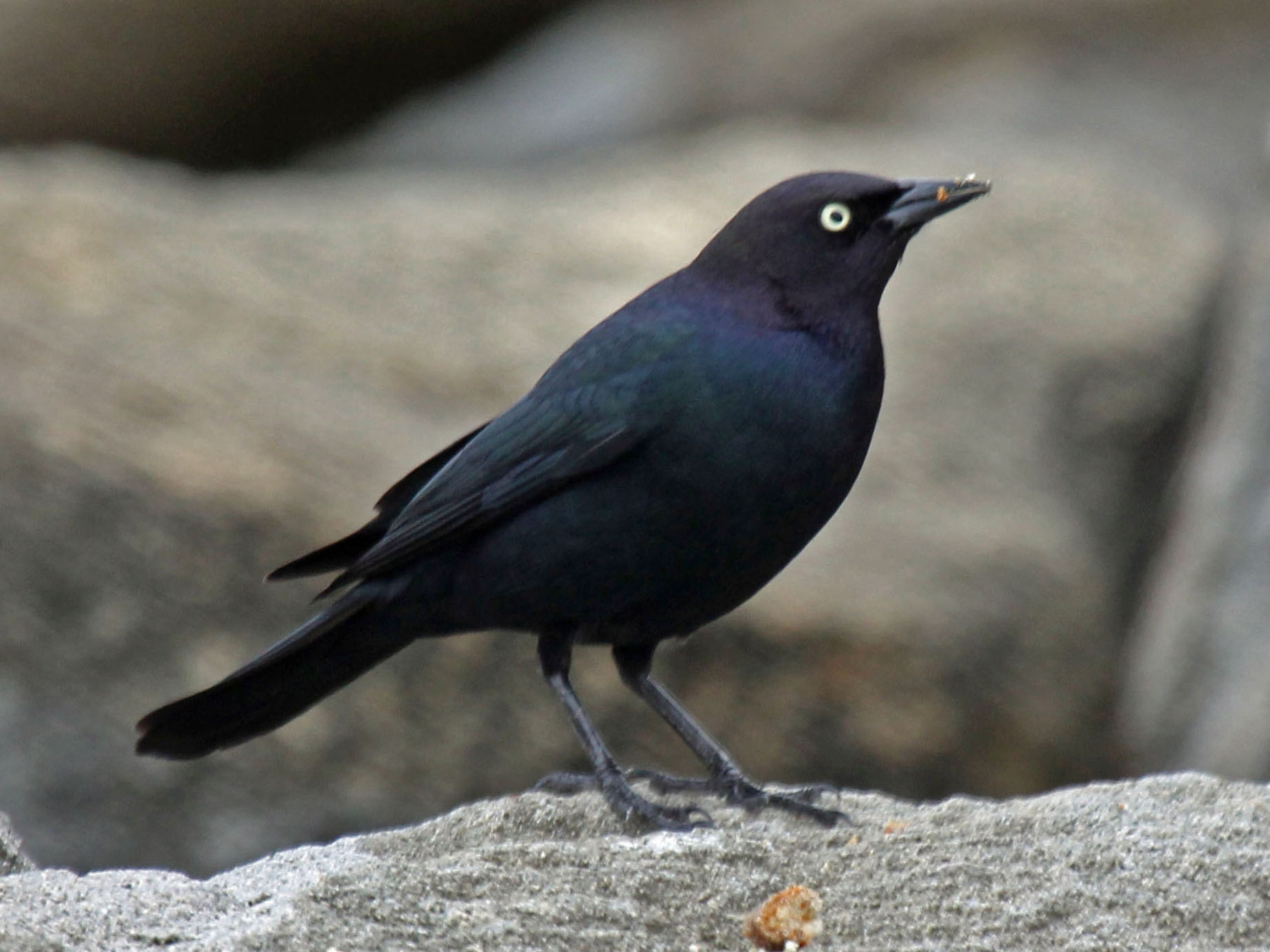
A Brewer's blackbird

The icterids are a group of small to medium-sized, often colorful passerine birds restricted to the New World and include the grackles, New World blackbirds, and New World orioles. Most species have black as a predominant plumage color which is often enlivened by yellow, orange, or red.

- Yellow-headed blackbird, Xanthocephalus xanthocephalus, lakes, marshes, meadows (R)
- Bobolink, Dolichonyx oryzivorus, marshes, meadows (O)
- Western meadowlark, Sturnella neglecta, meadows (R)
- Bullock's oriole, Icterus bullocki, riparian (O)
- Baltimore oriole, Icterus galbula, riparian (O)
- Red-winged blackbird, Agelaius phoenicus, lakes, marshes, meadows (U)
- Brown-headed cowbird, Molothrus ater, montane forests, marshes, meadows
- Rusty blackbird, Euphagus carolinus, meadows (O)
- Brewer's blackbird, Euphagus cyanocephalus, montane forests, marshes, meadows
- Common grackle, Quiscalus quiscula, montane forests, marshes, meadows (U)

== New World warblers ==
Order: Passeriformes Family: Parulidae

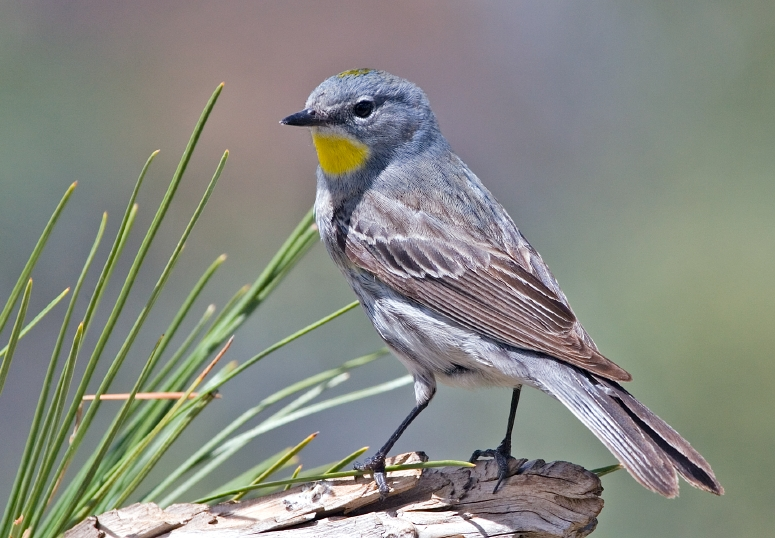
An "Audubon's" yellow-rumped warbler

The wood-warblers are a group of small often colorful passerine birds restricted to the New World. Most are arboreal, but some are more terrestrial. Most members of this family are insectivores.

- Ovenbird, Seiurus aurocapillus, riparian (O)
- Worm-eating warbler, Helmitheros vermivorus, riparian (O)
- Northern waterthrush, Parkesia noveboracensis, riparian (O)
- Golden-winged warbler, Vermivora chrysoptera, riparian (O)
- Black-and-white warbler, Mniotilta varia, montane forests, riparian (O)
- Tennessee warbler, Leiothlypis peregrina, riparian (O)
- Orange-crowned warbler, Leiothlypis celata, montane and subalpine forests, riparian (U)
- Nashville warbler, Leiothlypis ruficapilla, riparian (O)
- Virginia's warbler, Leiothlypis virginiae, montane forests, riparian (U)
- Connecticut warbler, Oporornis agilis, riparian (Unc)
- MacGillivray's warbler, Geothlypis tolmiei, montane and subalpine forests, riparian (U)
- Common yellowthroat, Geothlypis trichas, riparian, meadows (O)
- Hooded warbler, Setophaga citrina, riparian (O)
- American redstart, Setophaga ruticilla, riparian (O)
- Cape May warbler, Setophaga tigrina, riparian (O)
- Northern parula, Setophaga americana, riparian (O)
- Magnolia warbler, Setophaga magnolia, riparian (O)
- Bay-breasted warbler, Setophaga castanea, riparian (O)
- Blackburnian warbler, Setophaga fusca, riparian (O)
- Yellow warbler, Setophaga petechia, montane forests, riparian (U)
- Chestnut-sided warbler, Setophaga pensylvanica, riparian (O)
- Black-throated blue warbler, Setophaga caerulescens, riparian (O)
- Palm warbler, Setophaga palmarum, riparian (O)
- Yellow-rumped warbler, Setophaga coronata, montane and subalpine forests, riparian
  - "Audubon's" warbler, Setophaga coronata auduboni, montane and subalpine forests, riparian
  - "Myrtle" warbler, Setophaga coronata coronata, riparian (O)
- Grace's warbler, Setophaga graciae, montane forests, riparian (O)
- Black-throated gray warbler, Setophaga nigrescens, montane forests, riparian (O)
- Townsend's warbler, Setophaga townsendi, montane and subalpine forests, riparian (R)
- Black-throated green warbler, Setophaga virens, riparian (O)
- Wilson's warbler, Cardellina pusilla, montane and subalpine forests, riparian

== Cardinals and allies ==
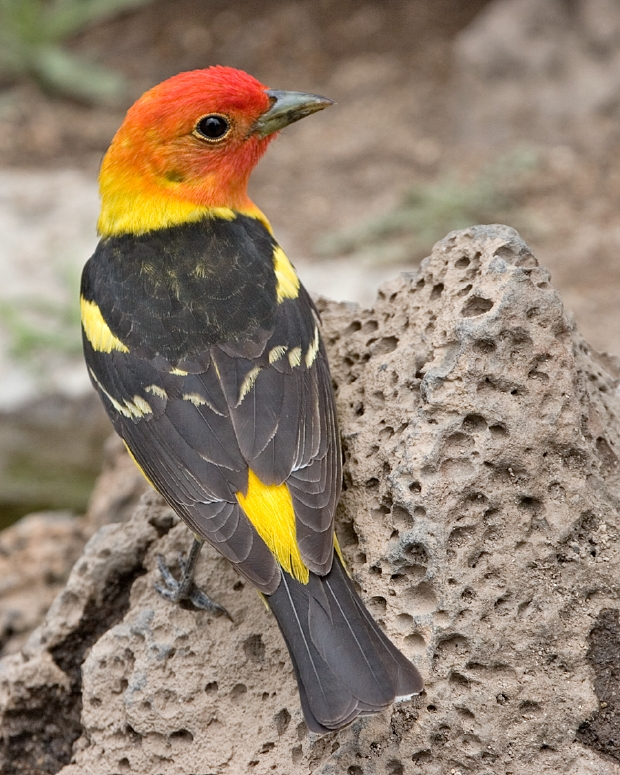
A western tanager

Order: Passeriformes Family: Cardinalidae

The cardinals are a family of robust seed-eating birds with strong bills. They are typically associated with open woodland. The sexes usually have distinct plumages.

- Hepatic tanager, Piranga flava, montane forests (O)
- Scarlet tanager, Piranga olivacea, montane forests (O)
- Western tanager, Piranga lucoviciana, montane and subalpine forests
- Rose-breasted grosbeak, Phoecticus ludovicianus, montane forests (O)
- Black-headed grosbeak, Phoecticus melanocephalus, montane forests (U)
- Blue grosbeak, Passerina caerulea (Unc)
- Lazuli bunting, Passerina emoena, montane forests, marshes (R)
- Indigo bunting, Passerina cyanea (Unc)

== See also ==
- List of birds
- Lists of birds by region
- List of North American birds
- List of birds of Colorado
- List of birds of Black Canyon of the Gunnison National Park
- Bibliography of Colorado
- Geography of Colorado
- History of Colorado
- Index of Colorado-related articles
- List of Colorado-related lists
- Outline of Colorado
