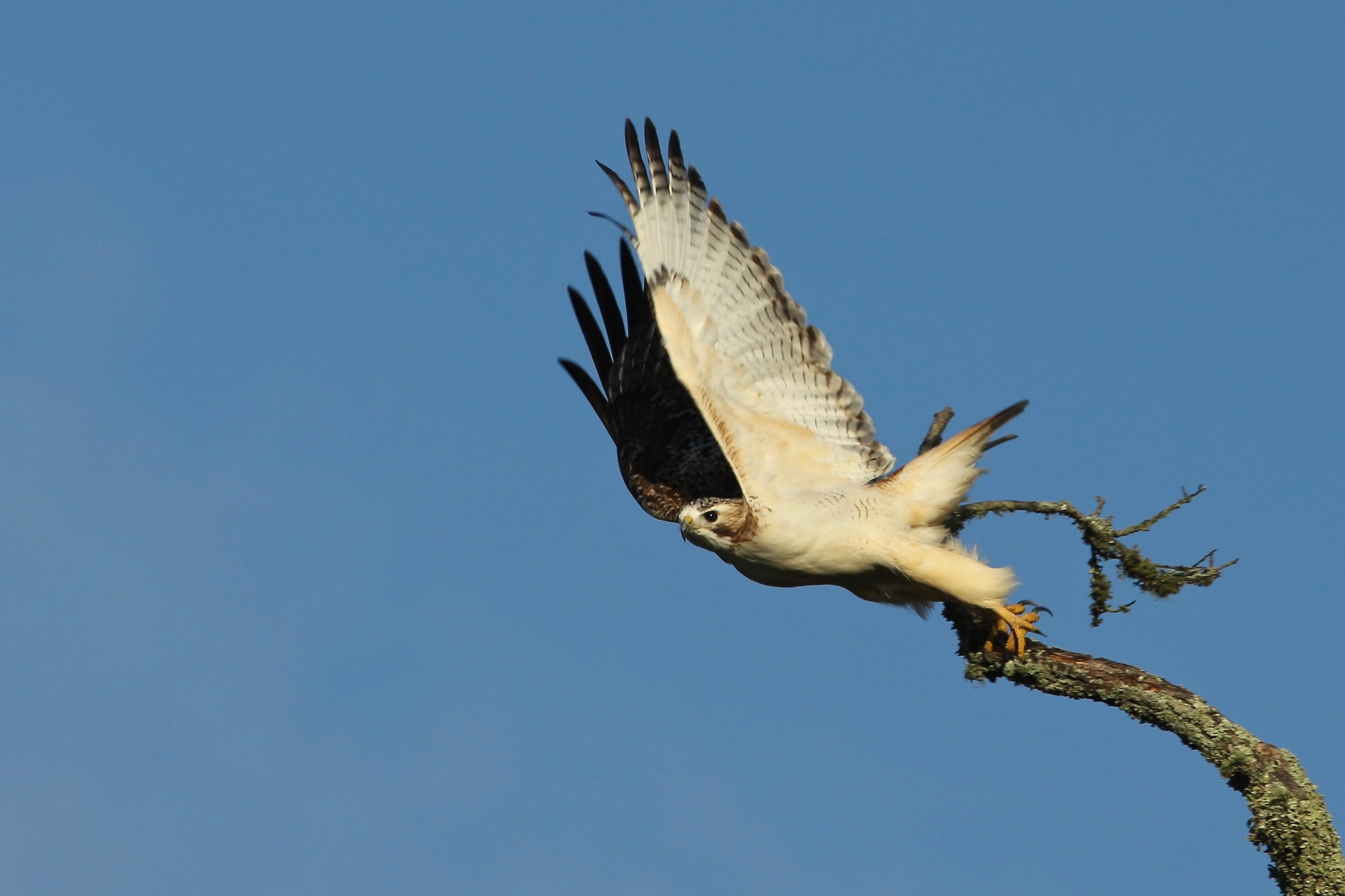
- Krider's red-tailed hawk, a pale color morph or race of red-tailed hawk

Scientific classification
- Kingdom: Animalia
- Phylum: Chordata
- Class: Aves
- Order: Accipitriformes
- Family: Accipitridae
- Genus: Buteo
- Species: B. jamaicensis
- Subspecies: B. j. kriderii

Trinomial name
- Buteo jamaicensis kriderii Hoopes, 1873

= Krider's hawk =

Subspecies of bird

Krider's hawk or Krider's red-tailed hawk (Buteo jamaicensis kriderii) is a subspecies or color morph of red-tailed hawk. Authorities vary in their treatment of the taxon.

== Taxonomy ==
It was named after John Krider, the gunsmith from Philadelphia who collected the type specimen, which is preserved in the collection of the Academy of Natural Sciences of Drexel University.

== Description ==
It is about the same size as the western red-tailed hawk (B. j. calurus). Wing chord averages 378.9 mm (14.92 in) in males and 411.9 mm (16.22 in). Males and females average 220.9 and 237 mm (8.70 and 9.33 in) in tail length, 85 and 87.9 mm (3.35 and 3.46 in) in tarsal length and 25.6 and 26.8 mm (1.01 and 1.06 in) in culmen length.

== Distribution ==
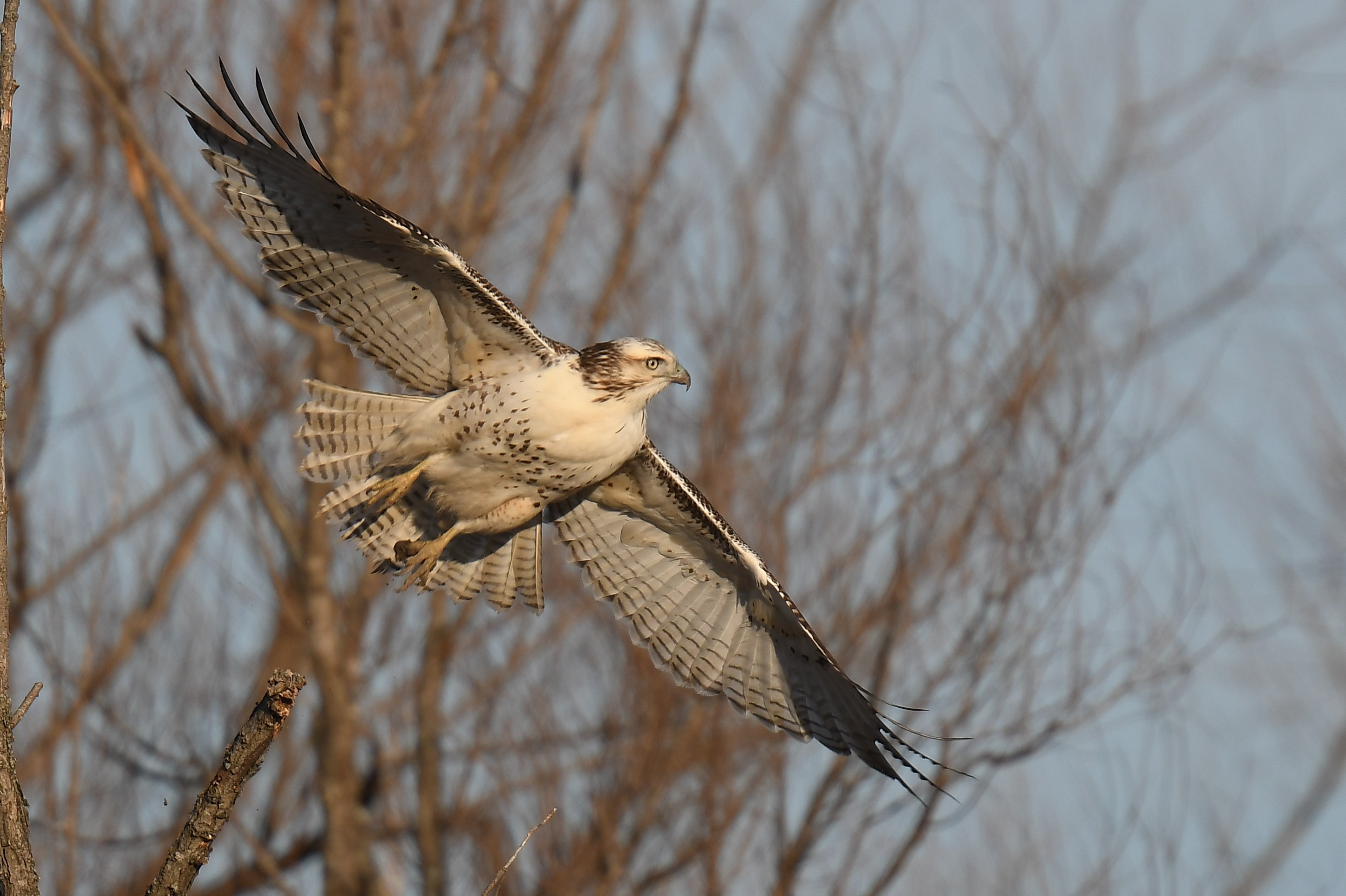
Krider's red-tailed hawk in flight

In the breeding season, it occurs from southern Alberta, southern Saskatchewan, southern Manitoba, and extreme western Ontario south to south-central Montana, Wyoming, western Nebraska, and western Minnesota. In winter, it occurs from South Dakota and southern Minnesota south to Arizona, New Mexico, Texas and Louisiana.

== Hybridization ==
Hybridization is possible and known to occur, most extensively with B. j. calurus, but also in the Dakotas and eastern Wyoming with the eastern red-tailed hawk (B. j. borealis) and in Alberta some possible Krider's hybrids with Harlan's hawks (B. j. harlani) have been reported (despite being considerably farther east than Harlan's tend to breed). Krider's hawk is paler than other red tails, with the head typically white (and the crown invariably so) with somewhat darker nape, variable dark markings about the face (sometimes either through the eyes, forming a moustache or ear streaks). The upperparts are light brown, with the upper-wing coverts heavily mottled in white, the tail is typically whitish at the base otherwise a fairly pale pink rufous (more rufous than the somewhat similar marked ferruginous hawk, which also have rufous "trousers" that are pure white on Krider's). Krider's hawks are distinctly all white underneath with no trace of a belly band, unlike the palest B. m. harlani. There is much individual variation, which is complicated by possible racial hybridization. One study found males more likely than females to have pure B. j. kriderii characteristics. The same study found that Krider's hawks were fully specialized as breeders for the prairie habitat, favoring much more open areas than do other red tails or especially Harlan's hawks. Although Harlan's and Krider's hawks often winter in the same general regions, their habitat preferences differ significantly—Harlan's hawks favor densely wooded areas, while Krider's hawks prefer open, grassy landscapes. Wintering Krider's also used different and more open habitats than resident red tails. These authors questioned whether Krider's hawk was once a pure subspecies, similar to the prairie merlin, but following human habitat alterations, B. j. calurus and B. j. borealis encroached into their breeding ranges and diluted their characteristics.
