= John Krider =

American ornithologist and gunsmith

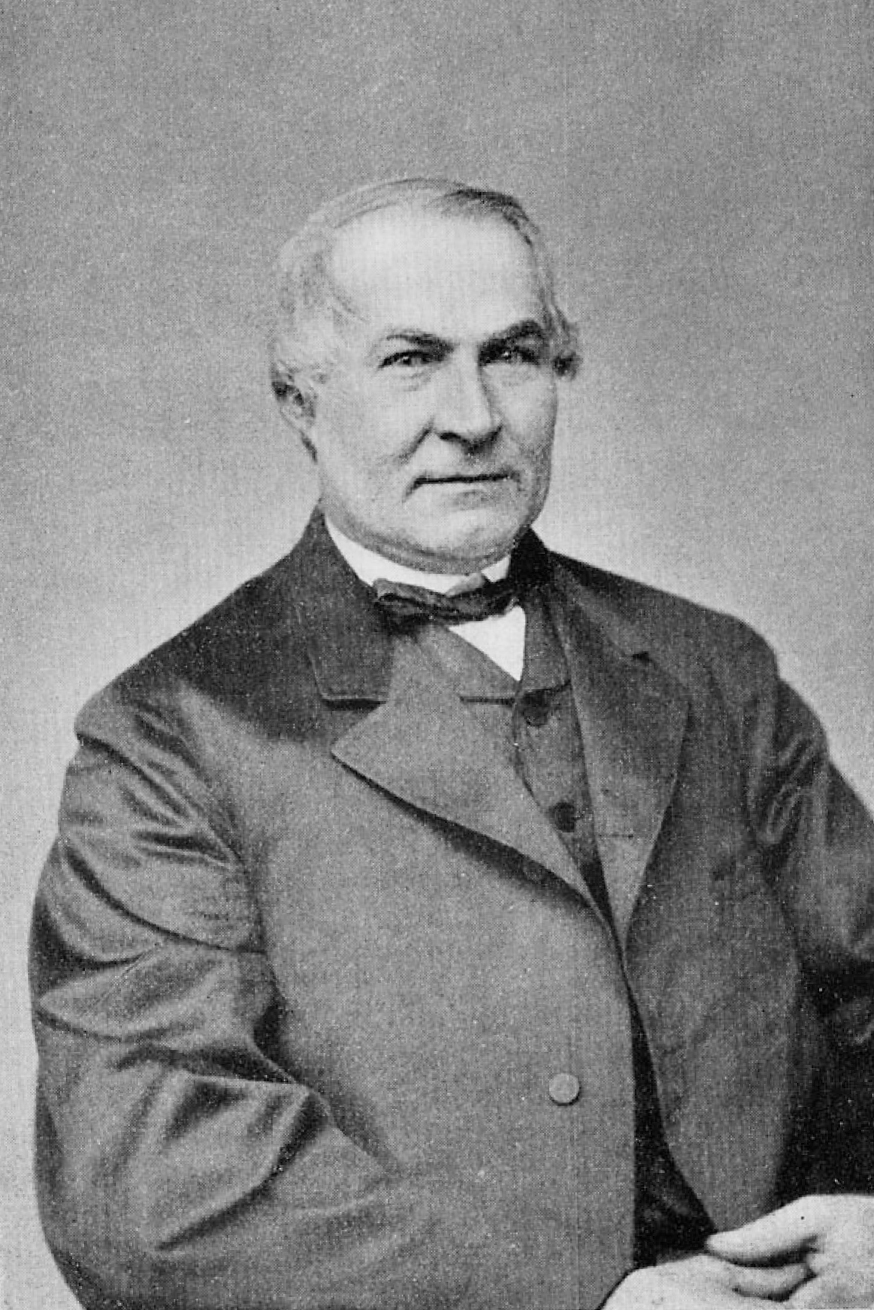
- Born: February 17, 1813; Philadelphia, Pennsylvania, US
- Died: November 12, 1886 (aged 73); Philadelphia, Pennsylvania, US
- Known for: LeMat Revolver, ornithology, gunsmith
- Scientific career
- Fields: Gunsmith, ornithologist
- Workplaces: Academy of Natural Sciences of Philadelphia

John Krider (February 17, 1813 – November 12, 1886) was an American gunsmith and ornithologist who operated a sporting goods store on the northeast corner of Second St. and Walnut St. in Philadelphia, Pennsylvania, for much of the 19th century. On the second floor of Krider's shop was a taxidermy shop, where hundreds of bird specimens were prepared over multiple decades.

In 1859, Krider manufactured the first 25 prototypes of the LeMat Revolver, also known as the "Grape Shot Revolver". The unique firearm had been developed in New Orleans in 1856 by Jean Alexandre Le Mat, whose manufacturing effort was backed by P. G. T. Beauregard, who became a general in the Confederate States Army.

He is the namesake of Krider's hawk (Buteo jamaicensis kriderii).

== Biography ==
=== Early life ===
Krider was born in West Philadelphia in 1813, and became the apprentice of Prosper Vallee the gunsmith in 1826. Vallee had opened a shop about ten years earlier, in a stone house built in 1751 by Edward Drinker, on the northeast corner of Second and Walnut streets, Philadelphia. By 1839, Krider had bought Vallee's gunsmith business and founded a sporting goods store at that location.

=== Specimen collections ===
Krider was an avid collector and contributed hundreds of study skins, nests, and eggs to the Academy of Natural Sciences of Philadelphia (ANSP) during his lifetime. More than a century later, these specimens are widely distributed in museum collections including the National Museum of Natural History (Smithsonian Institution), Museum of Comparative Zoology (Harvard University), and American Museum of Natural History.

Krider collected many rare specimens in the Philadelphia area including yellow-headed blackbird and smooth-billed ani, which are now preserved in the ANSP collection. Krider published little, but his contributions were frequently acknowledged by other ornithologists. For example, in 1856, the curator of birds at ANSP, John Cassin, wrote: "Our friend Mr. John Krider, Gunsmith, whose establishment is a favorite place of resort of the Ornithologists and gunners of this city, and who is well acquainted with American birds, and very successful in obtaining specimens of rare species, has had several specimens of this Brant brought to him in the last two or three years."

=== Krider's hawk ===
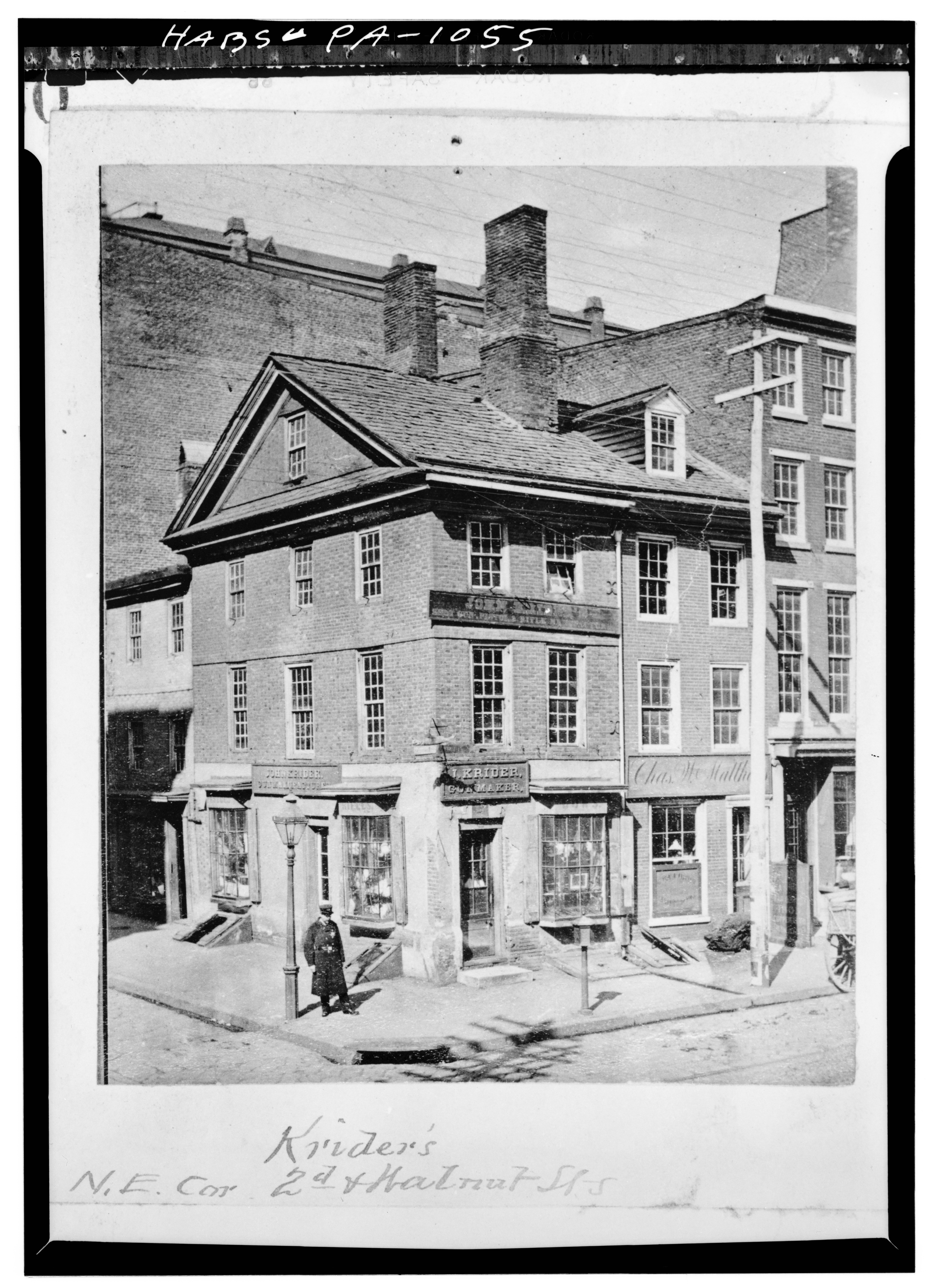
Historic photograph (c. 1880) of Krider's Gun Shop on the northeast corner of Second and Walnut streets. The building was razed in 1955.

Bernard A. Hoopes described Krider's hawk (Buteo jamaicensis kriderii), a disputed subspecies of red-tailed hawk, in 1873: "Being convinced that it is undescribed, I have named it in honor of the veteran naturalist to whom we are indebted for the discovery." The type specimen is preserved in the collection of the Academy of Natural Sciences of Drexel University.

== Publications ==
- Krider, J. (1853). Krider's Sporting Anecdotes, Illustrative of the Habits of Certain Varieties of American Game. (H. Milner Klapp, ed.). A. Hart, Philadelphia.
- Krider, J. (1879). Forty Years Notes of a Field Ornithologist. J. H. Weston, Philadelphia.

== Primary sources ==
A collection of records from Krider's Gun Shop are preserved at the Historical Society of Pennsylvania (Collection 3297).
