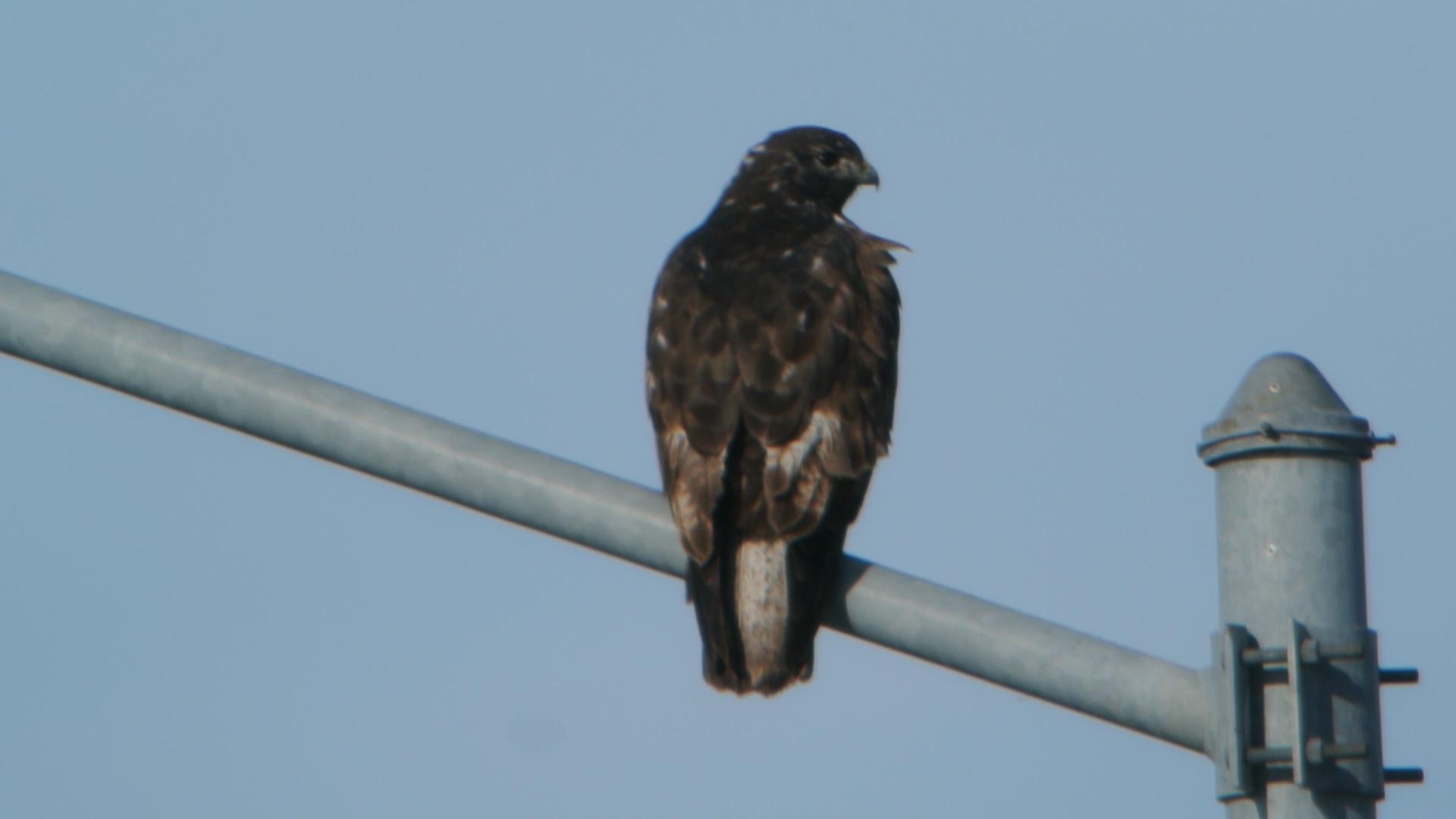
- A Harlan's hawk illustrates its silvery-white tail.

Scientific classification
- Kingdom: Animalia
- Phylum: Chordata
- Class: Aves
- Order: Accipitriformes
- Family: Accipitridae
- Genus: Buteo
- Species: B. jamaicensis
- Subspecies: B. j. harlani

Trinomial name
- Buteo jamaicensis harlani (Audubon, 1830)

= Harlan's hawk =

Subspecies of bird

Harlan's hawk or Harlan's red-tailed hawk (Buteo jamaicensis harlani) is a subspecies of the red-tailed hawk.

== Description ==
While similar in linear dimensions to the western red-tailed hawk (B. j. calurus), this race is sometimes described as slighter and lighter. On the contrary, though, they are highly sexually dimorphic in size (the most dimorphic of any in the United States) and mature females are sometimes more massive than almost any female B. j. calurus. However, B. j. calurus tends to have a much longer tarsus than Harlan's hawks do, as expected due to the latter's habitation to cold environments almost year around. The wing chord of males can range from 365 to 390 mm (14.4 to 15.4 in), averaging 381 mm (15.0 in), and, in females, it ranges from 390 to 430 mm (15 to 17 in), averaging 408.7 mm (16.09 in). Males and females average 211 and 225.3 mm (8.31 and 8.87 in) in tail length, 79.8 and 87 mm (3.14 and 3.43 in) in tarsal length and 24.7 and 27 mm (0.97 and 1.06 in) in culmen length. A wintering female in eastern Kansas weighed 1,629 g (3.591 lb).

The historic taxonomic status of Harlan's hawk has been quite erratic; sometimes, it has been classified as its own species, B. harlani to the opposite extreme that R. S. Palmer (1988) classified as it (perhaps improbably) as a mere western color morph. Most modern authorities recognize Harlan's hawk as a valid subspecies. Harlan's hawk is markedly different from all other red tails and can be identified nearly 100% of the time by an experienced hawk watcher. Throughout the morphs of this subspecies, the plumage is predominantly blackish, lacking any warmer or brownish tones (save the tail). Harlan's hawks usually have faint streaks on the sides of their head and about their chest with a bit of gray mottling or speckling on the scapulars. Apart from a variably white-streaked throat, their underparts are usually mostly black with variable white streaking and barring on the thighs or crissum. There are up to four main variations from the typical one described above: extreme dark morph (where even the throat is black and no pale streaking is present), dark morph (with barring still present from the tarsus to the underside), rare pale morph (with few blackish blobs on the belly and generally a whiter head) and perhaps even rarer types, the base color of which is grayish. Unlike most red-tailed hawks, immatures are generally similar enough to adults that it can be difficult to distinguish them. On average, immatures have more extensive pale streaking above and mottling below, but much individual variation has been recorded. The typical tail of a Harlan's hawk is white with a thick black subterminal band but individuals may vary considerably and the tail may be reddish, dusky, whitish or gray and can be longitudinally streaked, mottled or barred.

== Distribution ==
It breeds from central Alaska to northwestern Canada, with the largest number of birds breeding in the Yukon or western Alaska, reaching their southern limit in north-central British Columbia. Harlan's hawk is restricted as a breeder to pure taiga habitat. Harlan's hawk winters from Nebraska and Kansas to Texas and northern Louisiana, with a rare bird found as far east as Tennessee.
