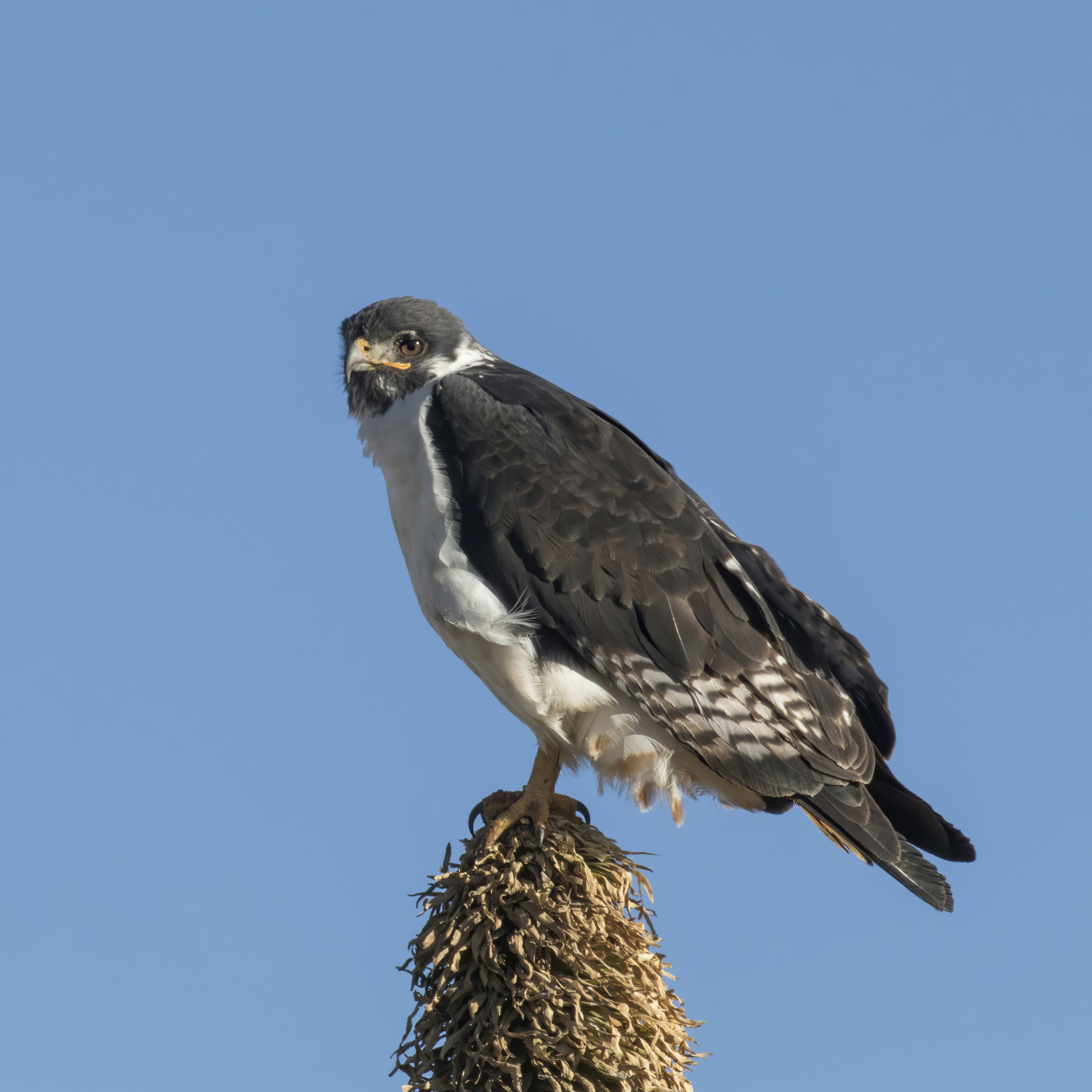
- Ethiopia

Conservation status
- Least Concern (IUCN 3.1)

Scientific classification
- Kingdom: Animalia
- Phylum: Chordata
- Class: Aves
- Order: Accipitriformes
- Family: Accipitridae
- Genus: Buteo
- Species: B. augur

Binomial name
- Buteo augur (Rüppell, 1836)
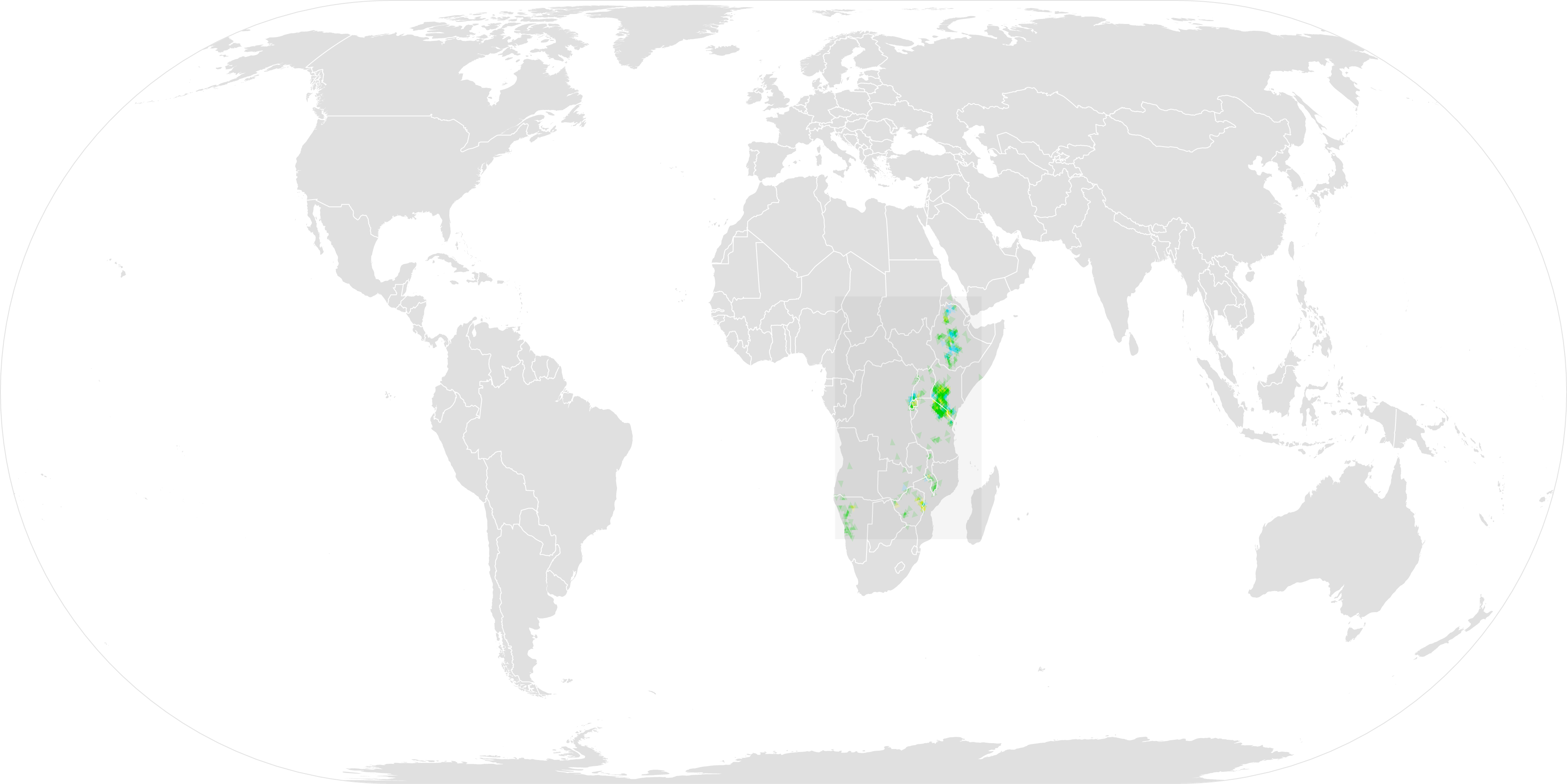
- Global map of eBird reports Year-Round Range Summer Range Winter Range

= Augur buzzard =

Species of bird

The augur buzzard (Buteo augur) is a fairly large African bird of prey. This species is distinct in typical adult plumage for its blackish back, whitish underside and orange-red tail, while juvenile augur buzzards are generally rather brown in colour; however a dark morph is known, which causes the bird's entire body to become darker. This member of the Buteo genus is distributed in several parts of the central and southern Africa, normally being found from Ethiopia to southern Angola and central Namibia. It is resident and non-migratory throughout its range. This is a species of mountains (most typically at about 2,000 m (6,600 ft) altitude, but up to 5,000 m (16,000 ft)), and adjacent savannah and grassland. It is a typical buteonine raptor, being a generalist predator which tends to prefer small mammals supplemented by reptiles and birds among various prey items.

== Taxonomy ==
The taxonomy on this species is not settled, with some taxonomists considering this species, the jackal buzzard (Buteo rufofuscus), and Archer's buzzard (Buteo augur archeri) to be within the same superspecies. As noted by taxonomists, each species is fairly distinct, having different calls and variations in plumage. While the augur and jackal have rarely been considered actually conspecific, the Archer's buzzard is sometimes considered improbably as a subspecies of the jackal buzzard despite a number of outward distinctions and having a rather allopatric and restricted distribution. The three species may be classified as belonging to a species complex. In 2022, the International Ornithological Congress tentatively assigned Archer's buzzard as being a subspecies of the augur buzzard (Buteo augur archeri). However, it may simply represent a color morph.

Presently, two subspecies are recognized:

- B. a. augur (Rüppell, 1836) - Ethiopia south to Zimbabwe, Angola south to central Namibia
- B. a. archeri Sclater, WL, 1918 (Archer's buzzard) - montane northern Somalia

== Description ==
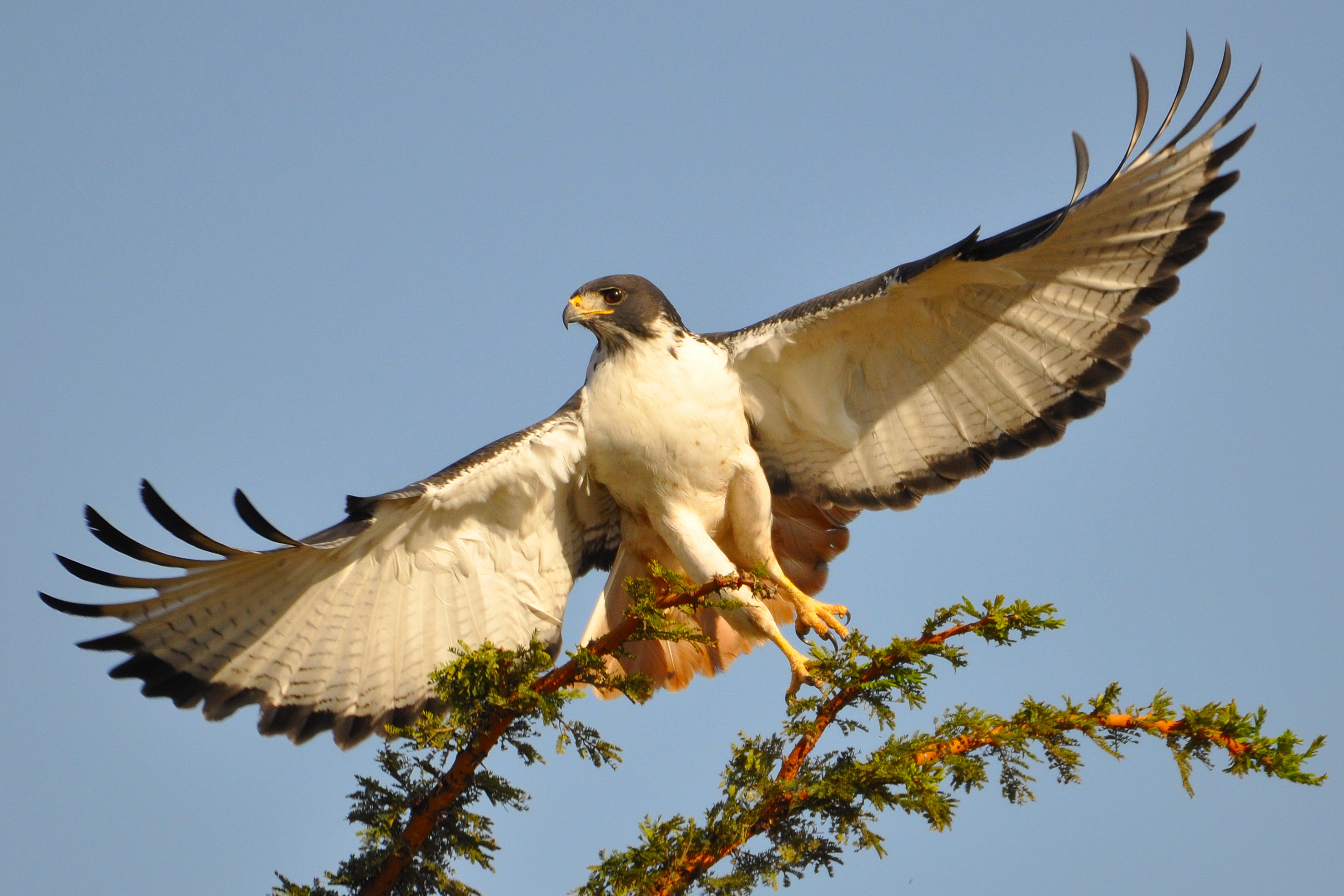
An augur buzzard in Serengeti National Park.

Augur buzzards are one of two larger Buteo species native to Africa, alongside their cousins, the similarly sized jackal buzzard. Adults measure about 48 to 60 cm (19 to 24 in) with a large wingspan of 120 to 150 cm (3 ft 11 in to 4 ft 11 in). Males weigh from 880 to 1,160 g (1.94 to 2.56 lb), while females weigh from 1,100 to 1,330 g (2.43 to 2.93 lb). A small sample of 5 augur buzzard weighed an average of 973.2 g (2.146 lb) while 22 birds averaged 131.5 cm (4 ft 4 in) in wingspan. The adult augur buzzard is strikingly plumaged and essentially unmistakable if seen well. It is an almost black brown above with a rufous tail that stands out strongly in contrast. The primary flight feathers are blackish and the secondaries off-white, both barred with black. Below the chin and around the throat is mainly white, and the rest of the underparts and the underwing coverts are rich rufous. The flight feathers from below are white, tipped with black to form a dark trailing edge to the wing.

The juvenile augur buzzard is mainly brown above and rufous brown below and on the tail. It may be confused with the steppe buzzard (Buteo buteo vulpinus), a migratory subspecies of the common buzzard (Buteo buteo) that overwinters in East and southern Africa. However, the augur is considerably larger and bulkier with broader wings and a heavier flight style and an unbarred undertail. Although not as dark as the adult on the back and upperwing coverts, it is usually noticeably darker than a juvenile steppe buzzard. The adult augur buzzard has white underparts and underwings. The female has black on the lower throat. Juveniles are brown above and buff below, the underparts later becoming white. Juveniles are similar to juvenile jackal buzzards but are generally much paler below with bolder carpal patches and more clearly barred secondaries and tail. There is a melanistic form of augur buzzard, all black, except for grey and white flight feathers that are barred black and contrast strongly with the black center and a chestnut tail. About 10% of birds are melanistic, but the proportion rises in forested areas with high rainfall to as much as 50% in some areas. A somewhat similar melanistic morph of jackal buzzard is also known and these birds can be very hard to distinguish, perhaps only told apart by the stronger barring on the melanistic augur pale flight feathers. Dark morph long-legged buzzards may also be confused for melanistic augur buzzards but are clearly more slender in the wing, less blackish on the body and lack the bold rufous tail.

== Range and habitat ==
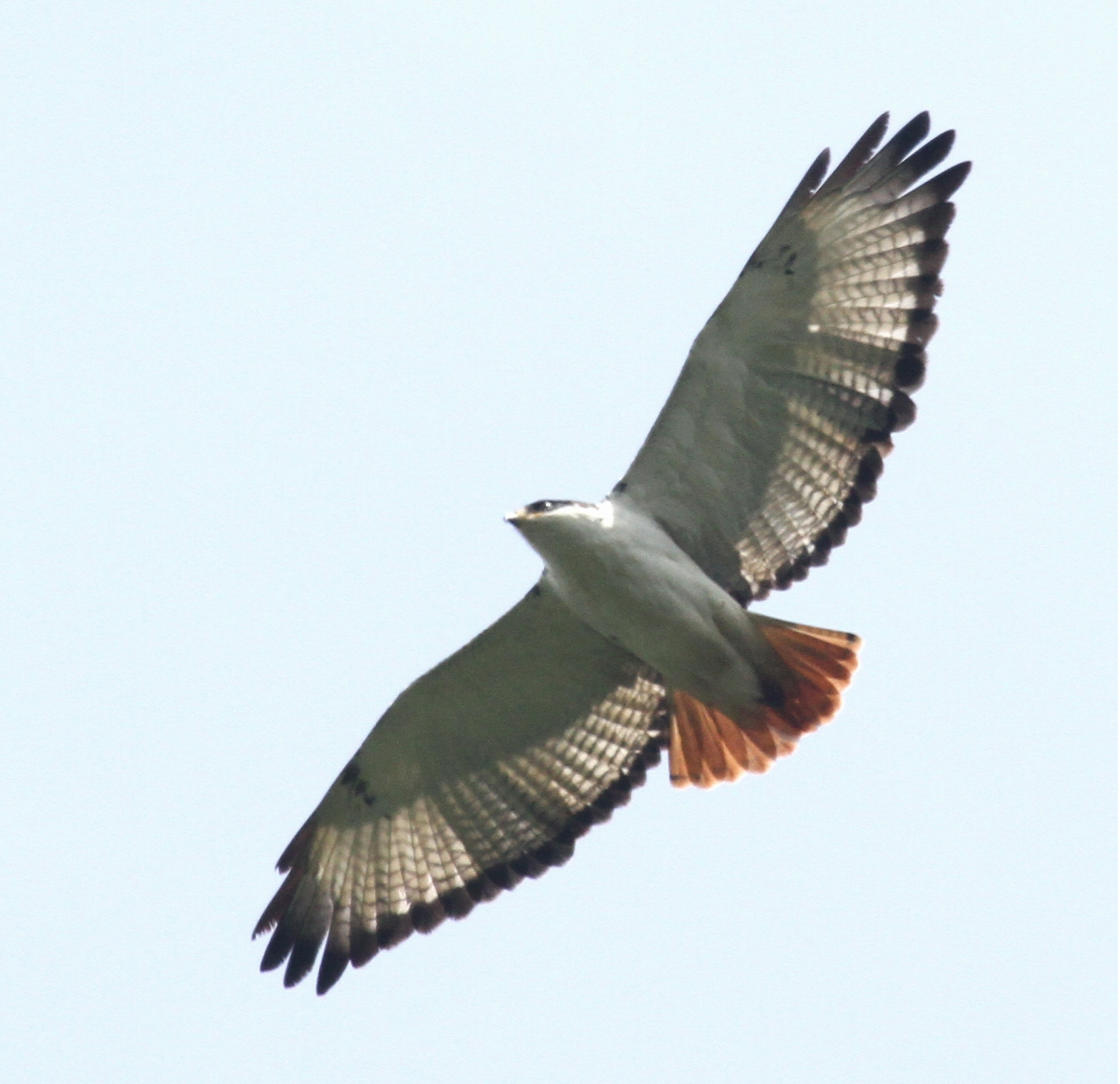
Gatamayu Forest - Kenya

The augur buzzard is found in eastern and southwestern Africa. Despite its erratic-seeming distribution, it is often common in its range. The augur buzzard is found from eastern Sudan and Ethiopia (also northern Somalia, inhabited by the subspecies B. a. archeri) down through the northeast of the Democratic Republic of the Congo, Uganda, Kenya, parts of Tanzania into Zambia, Malawi, Zimbabwe, Mozambique, western Angola and west-central Namibia. Despite its wide range in southern Africa it appears to only occur in South Africa as a vagrant. The augur buzzard is found in open or light wooded upland areas but can also range into lowland deserts at sea level (such as in Namibia) and some more mountainous, precipitous areas of eastern Africa. They seem to prefer to hunt in elevated savanna grasslands, high open moorland, inland cliffs, cropland sometimes into open forest or desert edges as well. Augur buzzards in east Africa usually live between 400 and 4,600 m (1,300 and 15,100 ft) elevation but normally occur above 1,500 m (4,900 ft) and have been recorded living at 5,000 m (16,000 ft) in Ethiopia.

== Behaviour ==
Pairs have noisy aerial displays, including outside the breeding season. Their call is quite different from their cousin, the jackal buzzard, and most other birds of prey, being a harsh, resonant crow-like a-kow a-kow a-kow or a-ung a-ung a-ung, drawn out as aerial display escalates into a longer, higher-pitched a-waaa a-waaa a-waaa. The large (up to 1 m [3 ft 3 in] wide) stick nest is built in a tree or on a crag, and is often reused and enlarged in subsequent seasons. On average two (sometimes only one and rarely three) creamy or bluish white eggs are laid and incubated by the female only, although food is brought to her on the nest by the male. Augur buzzards exhibit variations in breeding behaviour that appear to correlate with their habitat. In agricultural sites, increased maternal care and paternal foraging results in larger broods and more prey deliveries to nests. Reduced predation pressure from conspecifics and other raptors in agricultural sites as a result of lower inter-/intra-specific interactions may enable the species to maximise provisioning of their young hence potentially increasing productivity. Conversely, in natural sites, males often take on a larger share of incubation while females focus on defending the territory. The eggs hatch in about 40 days. Siblicide is known to occur in augur buzzards. After a further 56–60 days the chicks can attempt flight. At 70 days they become independent of the nest, but young birds may then be seen with the adult pair for some time. As is the case in other tropical raptors, the clutch size is relatively smaller and the reproductive cycle is relatively longer than in related species found in the temperate zones.

The diet of the augur buzzard is quite varied and opportunistic, as is typical of most Buteo species. It catches most of its prey on the ground, either by still-hunting from perch or swooping down from a soaring flight or, occasionally, from a hovering flight. They may also forage on the ground for both insects and small vertebrates. The primary foods for augur buzzards seem to include either small, terrestrial mammals or reptiles, chiefly snakes and lizards. Other prey may include small ground birds (and sometimes the nestlings, fledglings or unwary adults of varied birds), insects, and road-kill. In Zimbabwe, 59% of the diet was reptiles while the remainder was mostly mammalian, led by vlei rats. At one nest site there, lizards made up 35% of the foods and snakes 46%. In Tanzania, the stomach contents of augur buzzards similarly consisted mostly of assorted rat species and lizards. In the above Zimbabwe study, the most often taken reptiles recorded the giant plated lizards and common flat lizards but could extend to larger and more dangerous prey such as Nile monitors (though doubtfully large adults) and highly venomous snakes such as puff adders, night adders and Mozambique spitting cobras. Elsewhere mole-rats may be preferred, such as in Kenya, and these are likely hunted largely from flight as their tendency to stay in the cover of tall grasses makes them difficult to still-hunt. Occasionally larger prey are hunted including francolins, domestic chickens, hares and hyraxes, although other than rare cases mainly the juveniles of these prey types are targeted (especially in the case of Cape hyraxes).

== Conservation status ==
The augur buzzard is generally considered to be adaptable to human-modified landscapes and is classified as a species of low conservation concern. However, in areas experiencing rapid anthropogenic development, such as the Lake Naivasha region in Kenya, where urbanisation and agricultural expansion have intensified in recent years, local populations have declined at rates that could qualify the species for regional listing as vulnerable. There appears to be no direct link between human development and territorial abandonment, rather, abandonment may be associated with direct sources of mortality, such as human persecution, reduced prey availability and electrocutions.

== Popular culture ==
The Seattle Seahawks of the National Football League currently use an augur buzzard named Taima as a live mascot at games.

== Gallery ==
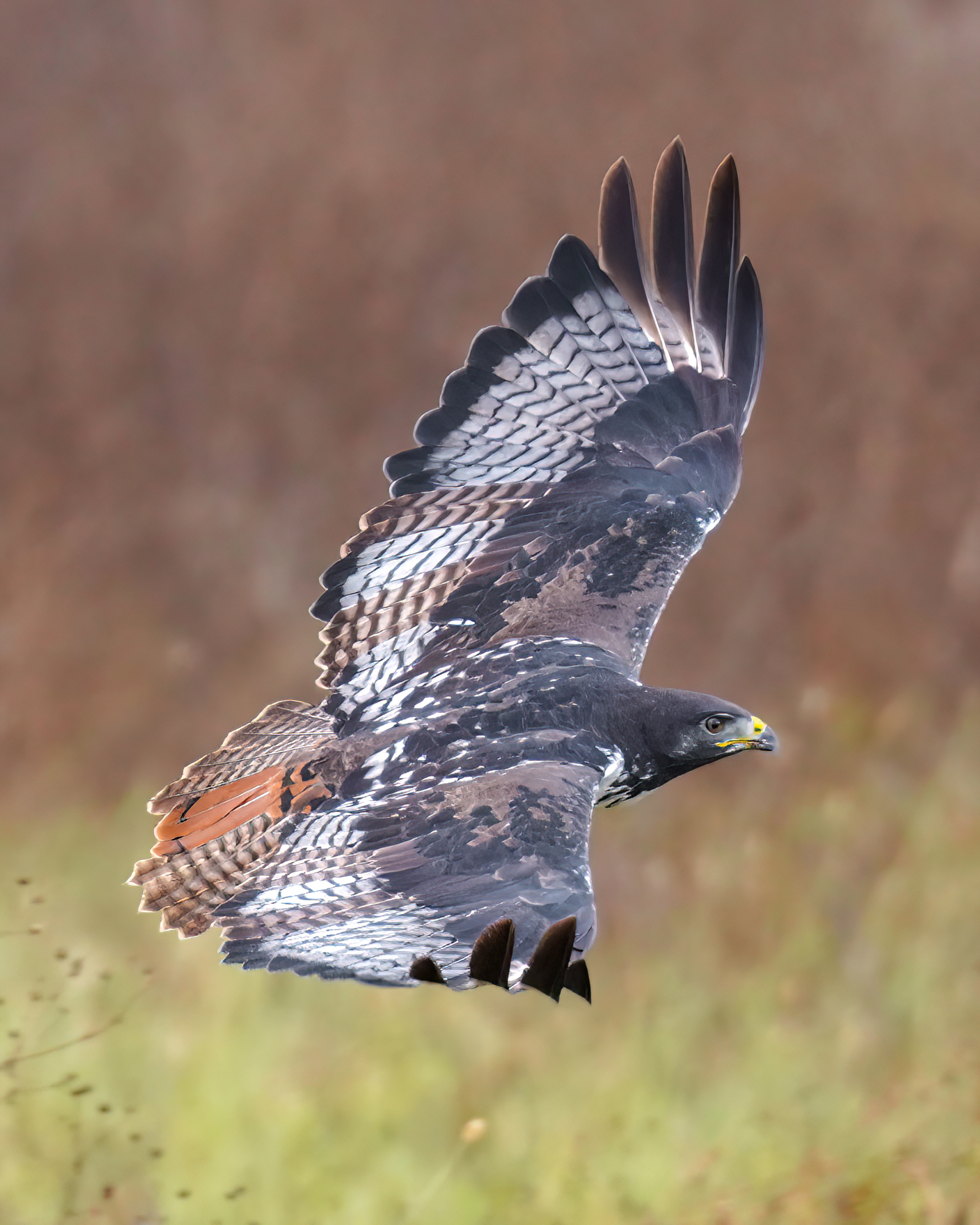
Augur buzzard in flight with top feathers view, Ngorongoro Conservation Area

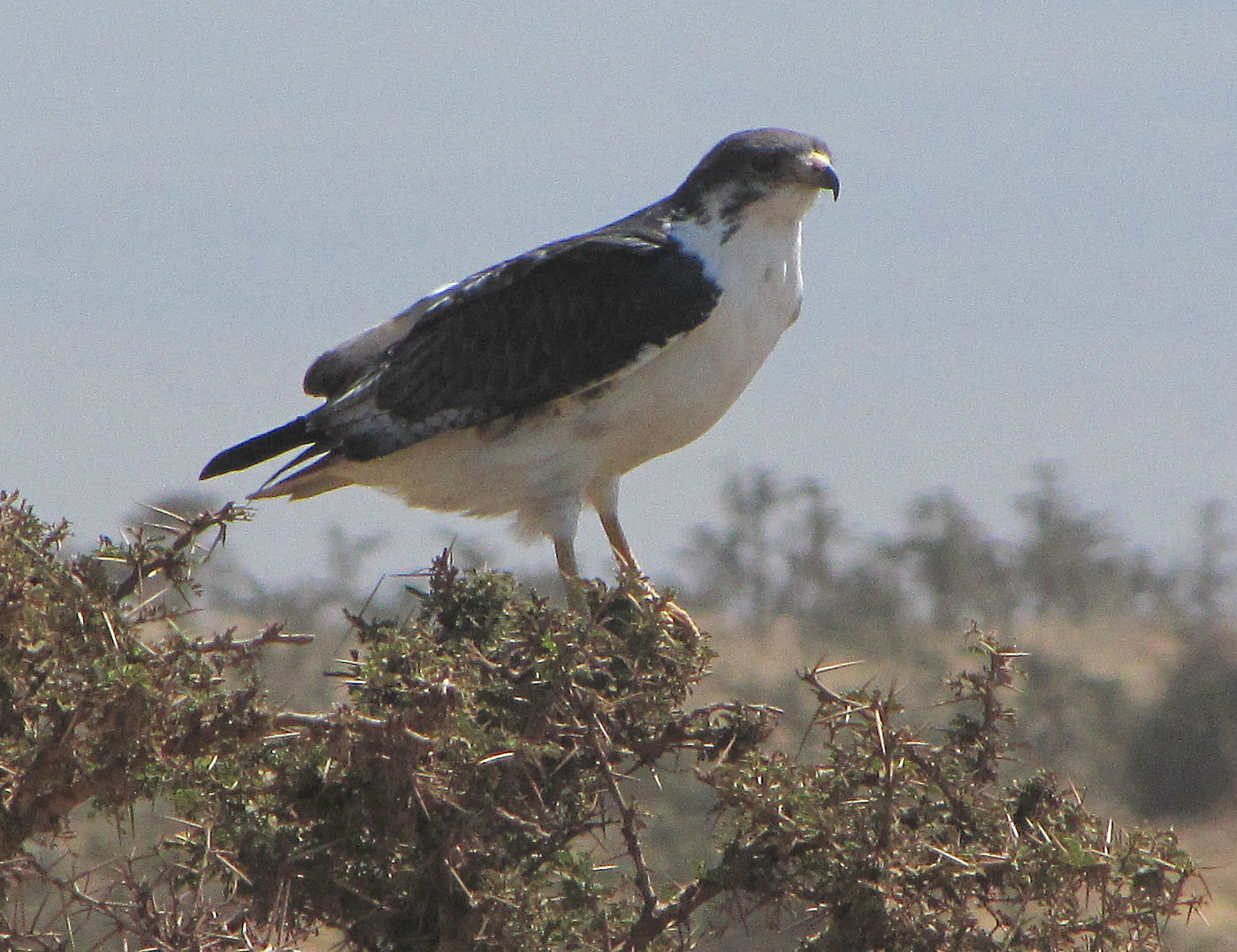
Lake Manyara, Tanzania

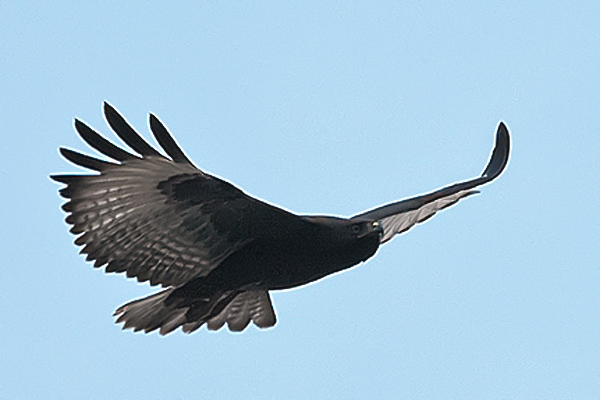
in flight near Kisoro, Uganda

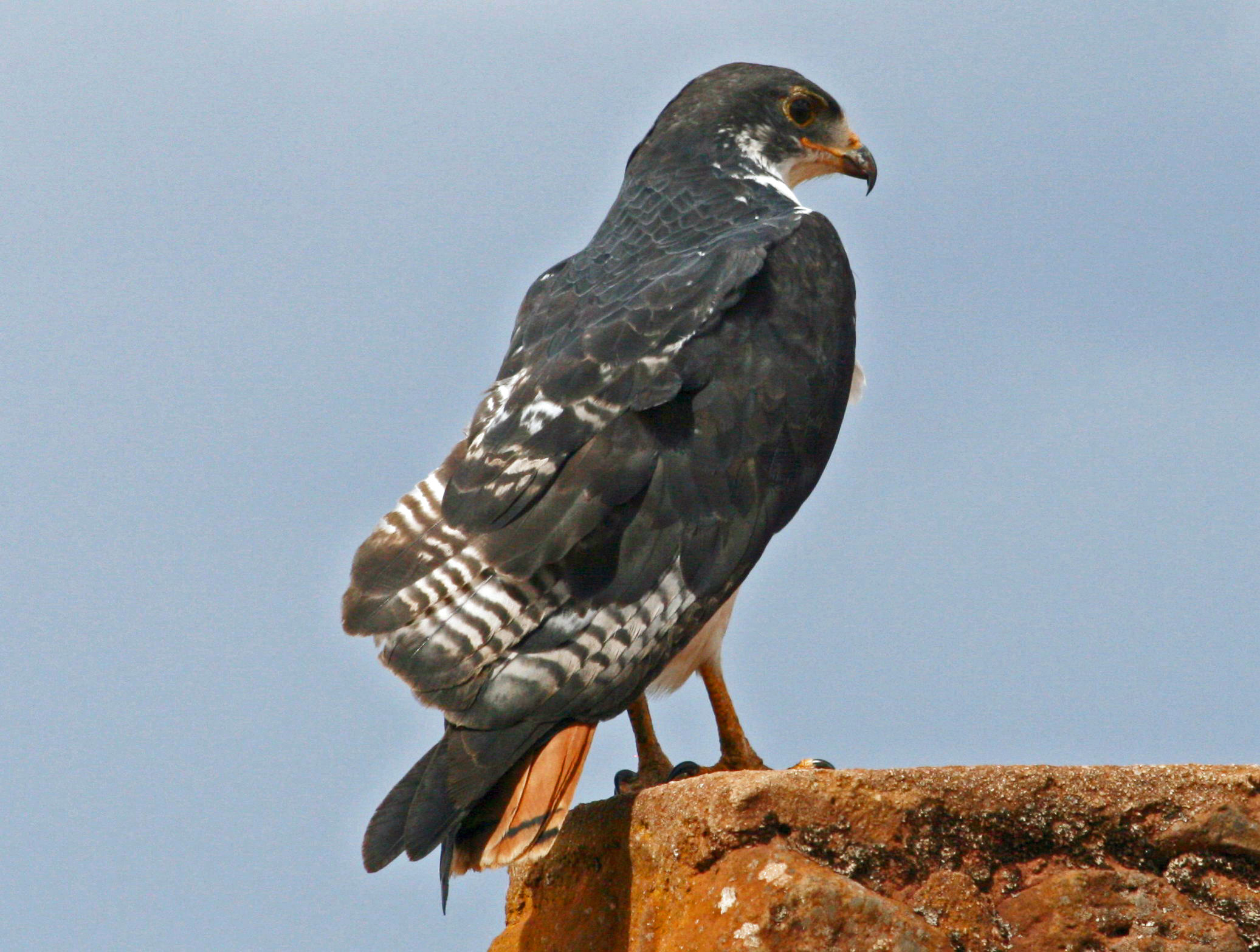
Tanzania

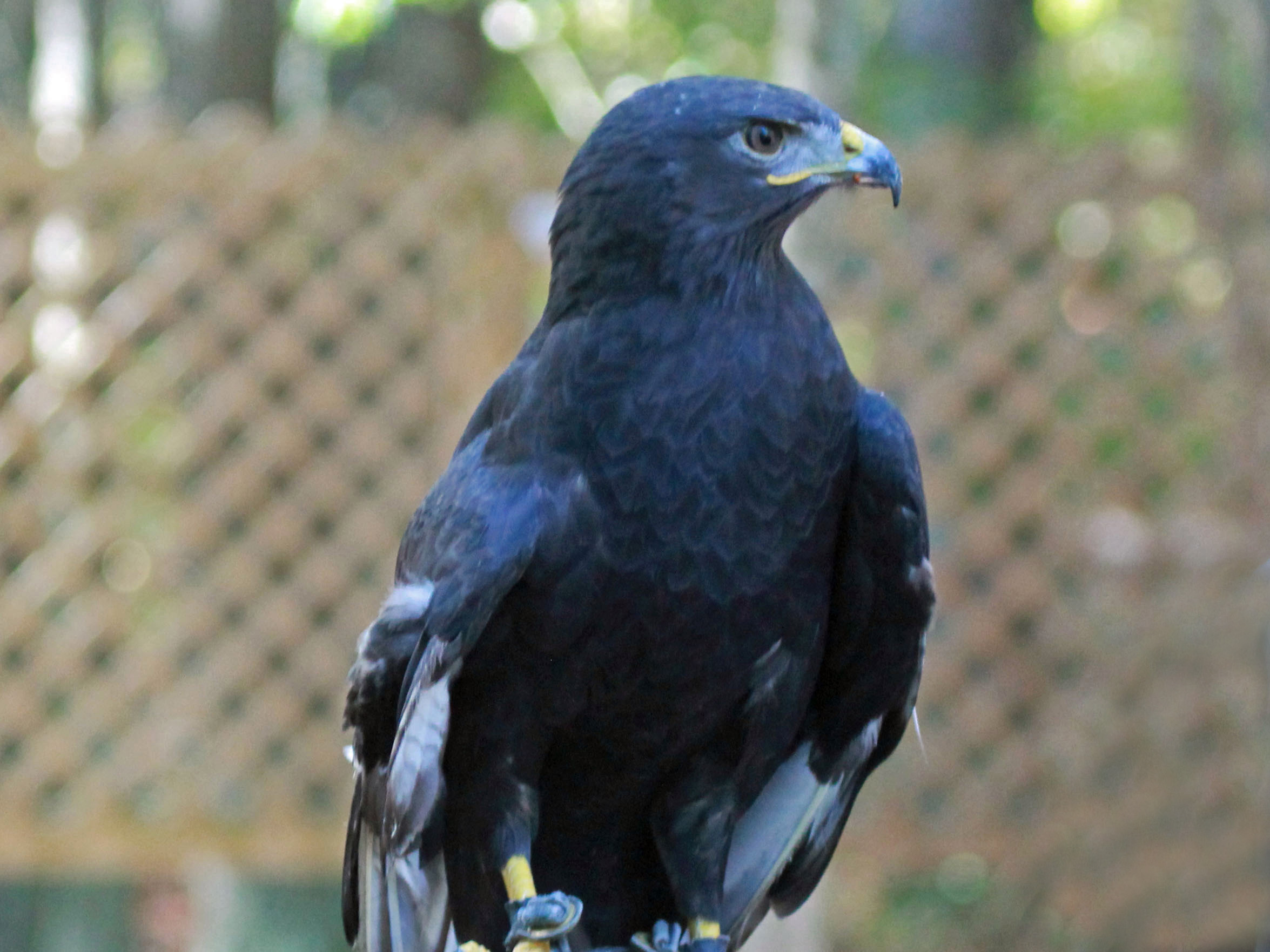
Carolina Raptor Center

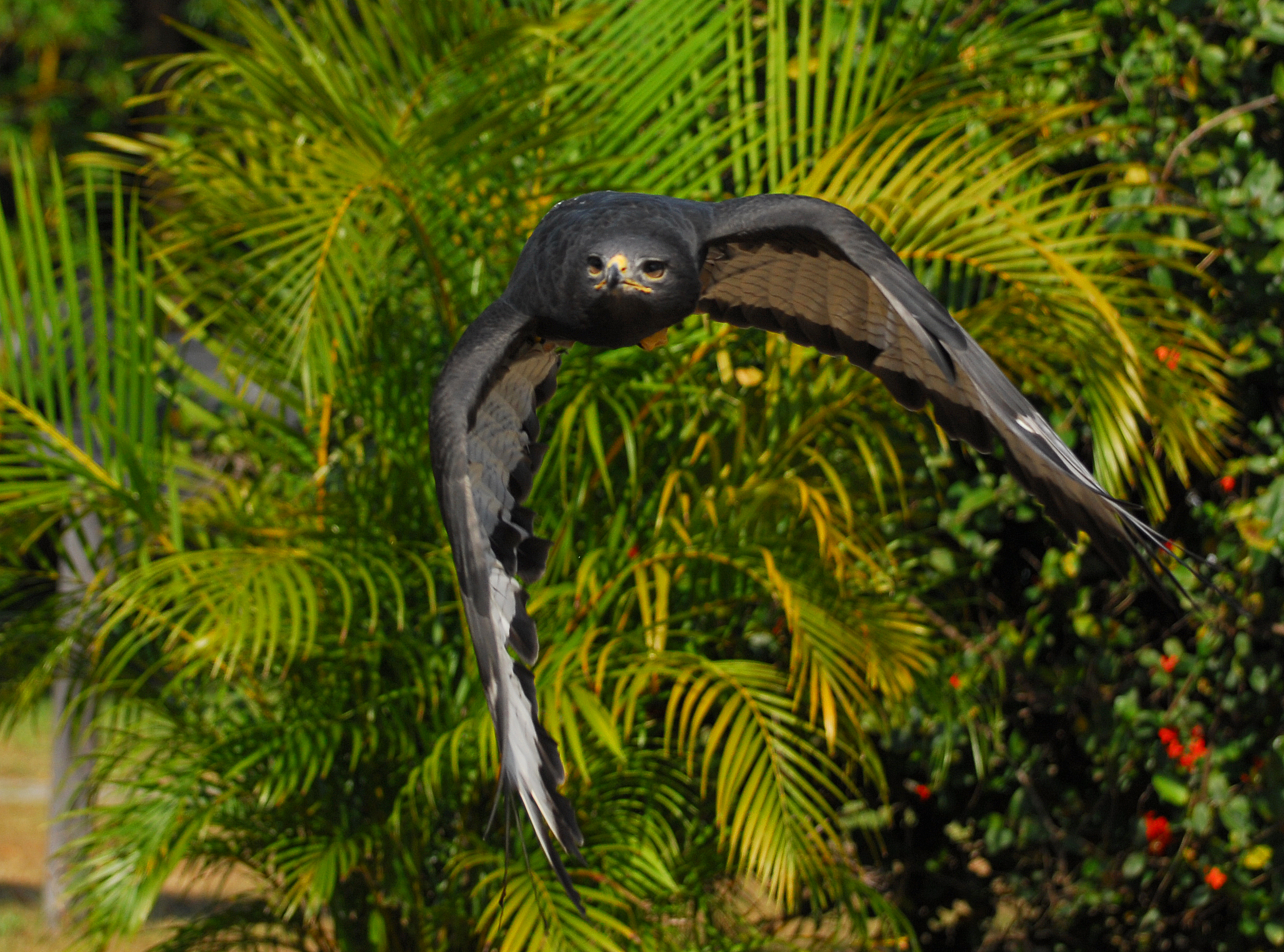
Dark-morph
