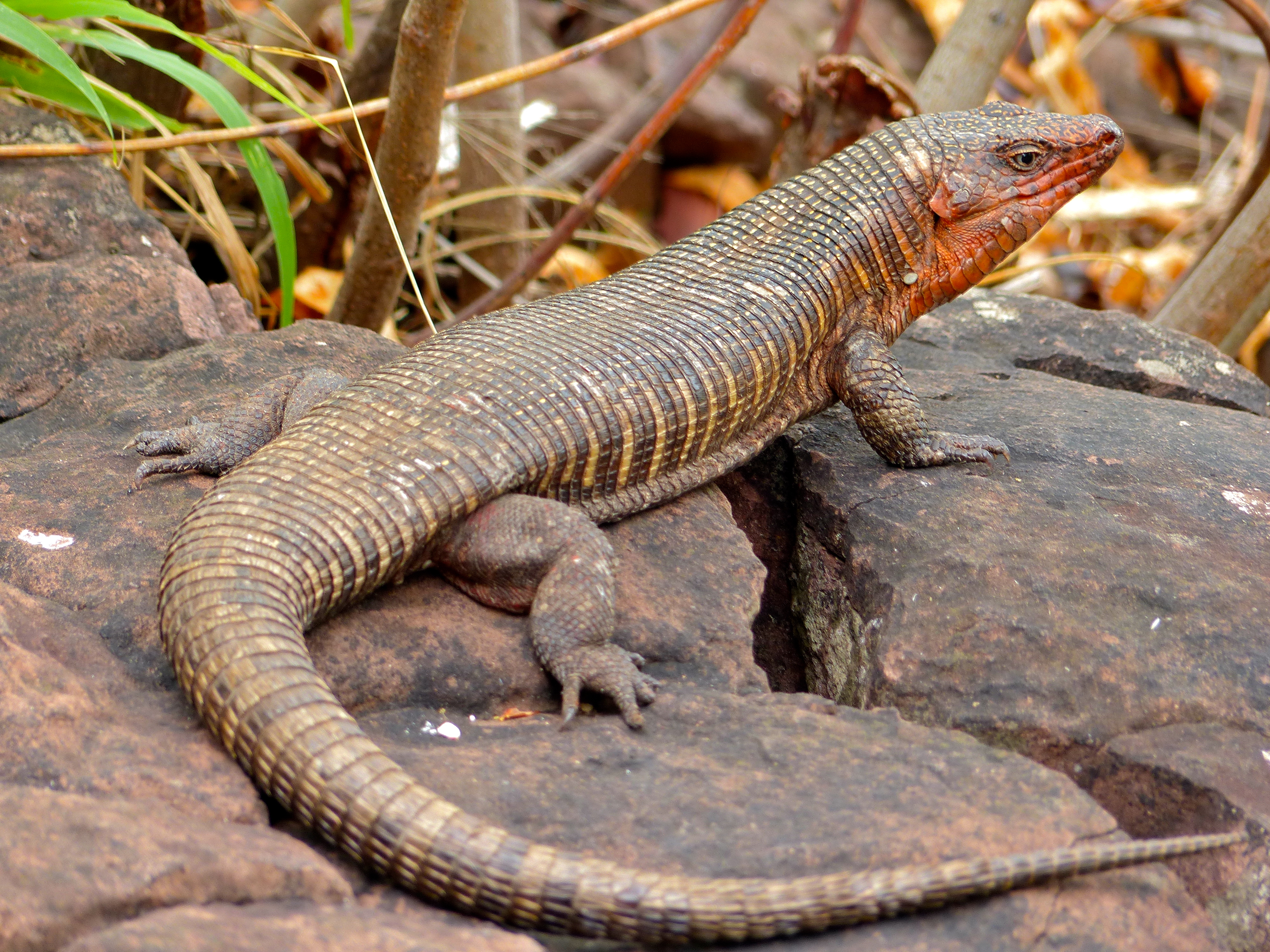
- common giant plated lizard, Matobosaurus validus

Scientific classification
- Kingdom: Animalia
- Phylum: Chordata
- Class: Reptilia
- Order: Squamata
- Family: Gerrhosauridae
- Subfamily: Gerrhosaurinae
- Genus: Matobosaurus; Bates & Tolley, 2013

= Matobosaurus =

Genus of lizards

Matobosaurus is a small genus of lizards in the family Gerrhosauridae. The genus is found in southern Africa.

== Species ==
There are two species which are recognized as being valid.

- Matobosaurus validus (Smith, 1849) – common giant plated lizard
- Matobosaurus maltzahni (De Grys, 1938) – western giant plated lizard
