= Matobosaurus maltzahni =

Conservation status
- Least Concern (IUCN 3.1)

Scientific classification
- Kingdom: Animalia
- Phylum: Chordata
- Class: Reptilia
- Order: Squamata
- Suborder: Scinciformata
- Infraorder: Scincomorpha
- Family: Gerrhosauridae
- Genus: Matobosaurus
- Species: M. maltzahni

Binomial name
- Matobosaurus maltzahni (De Grys, 1938)

Species of lizard

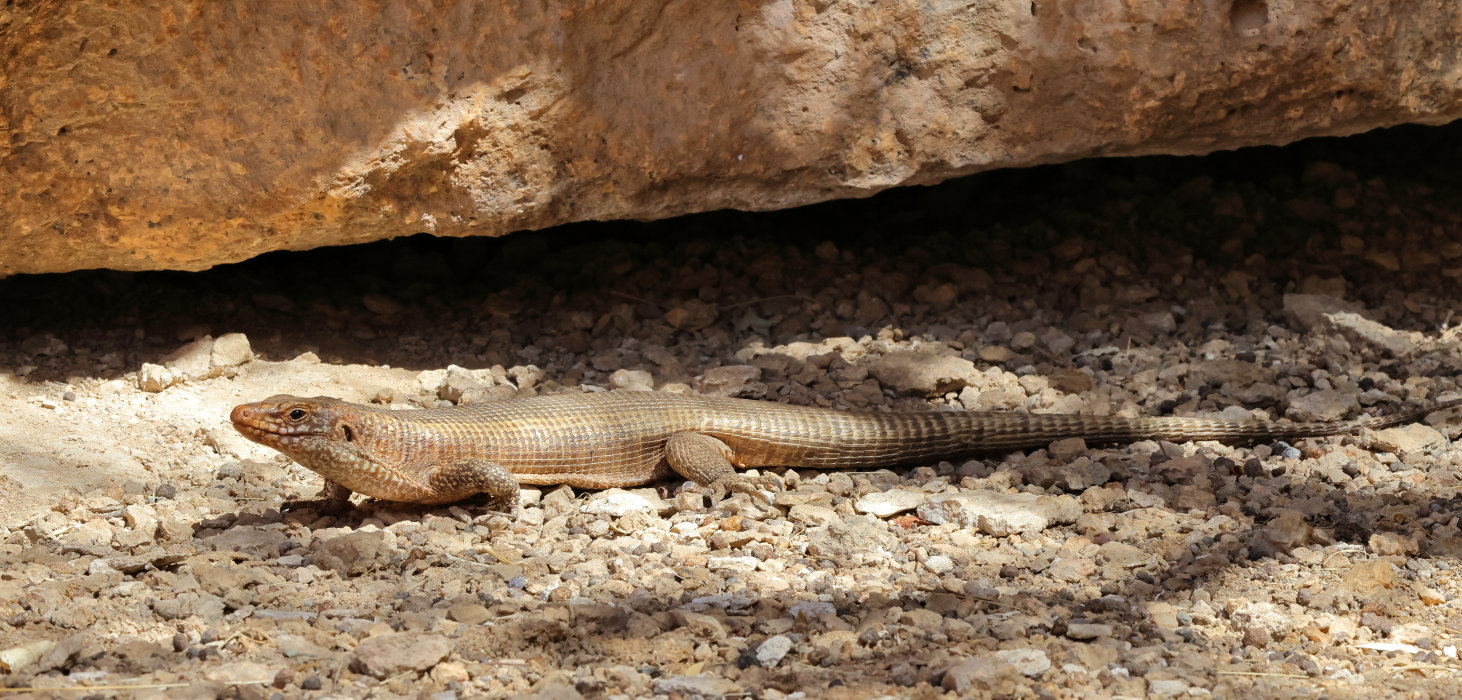
Giant lizard, Matobosaurus maltzahni, photographed at Spitzkoppe, Namibia, March 2023

The western giant plated lizard (Matobosaurus maltzahni) is a species of lizard in the Gerrhosauridae family. It is found in Angola and Namibia.
