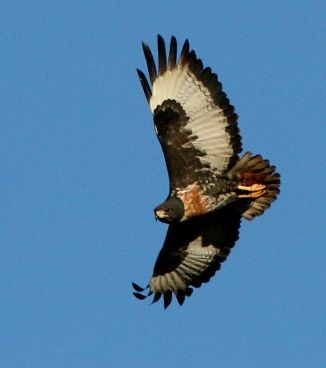
- Jackal buzzard flying in Ithala Game Reserve

Conservation status
- Least Concern (IUCN 3.1)

Scientific classification
- Kingdom: Animalia
- Phylum: Chordata
- Class: Aves
- Order: Accipitriformes
- Family: Accipitridae
- Genus: Buteo
- Species: B. rufofuscus

Binomial name
- Buteo rufofuscus (Forster, 1798)

Subspecies
- 3 ssp., see text

= Jackal buzzard =

Species of bird

The jackal buzzard (Buteo rufofuscus) is a fairly large African bird of prey. The taxonomy of this species has caused some confusion in the past and it almost certainly belongs in a species complex with other African Buteo species. Some taxonomists have considered this species, the Archer's buzzard (Buteo archeri), and the augur buzzard (Buteo augur) to be the same superspecies. Many taxonomists consider them all to be distinct, having different calls, different home ranges and variations in plumage. The species is resident and non-migratory throughout its range.

== Description ==
The jackal buzzard is one of the two larger Buteo species native to Africa, alongside its close cousin, the augur buzzard. Adults may measure 44 to 60 cm (17 to 24 in) in total length. In weight, one survey found 55 unsexed birds to weight from 790 to 1,370 g (1.74 to 3.02 lb) while another found seven males to weigh from 865 to 1,080 g (1.907 to 2.381 lb) and eleven females to weigh from 1,150 to 1,700 g (2.54 to 3.75 lb). Another female also weighed approximately 1,700 g (3.7 lb), making this one of the more massive Buteo species in the world. Eighteen jackal buzzards were found to have averaged 1,059.4 g (2.336 lb). Wingspan in this species is known to range from 127 to 143 cm (4 ft 2 in to 4 ft 8 in), with an average of 131.9 cm (4 ft 4 in) in 9 birds being almost identical to the mean wingspan of the augur buzzard.

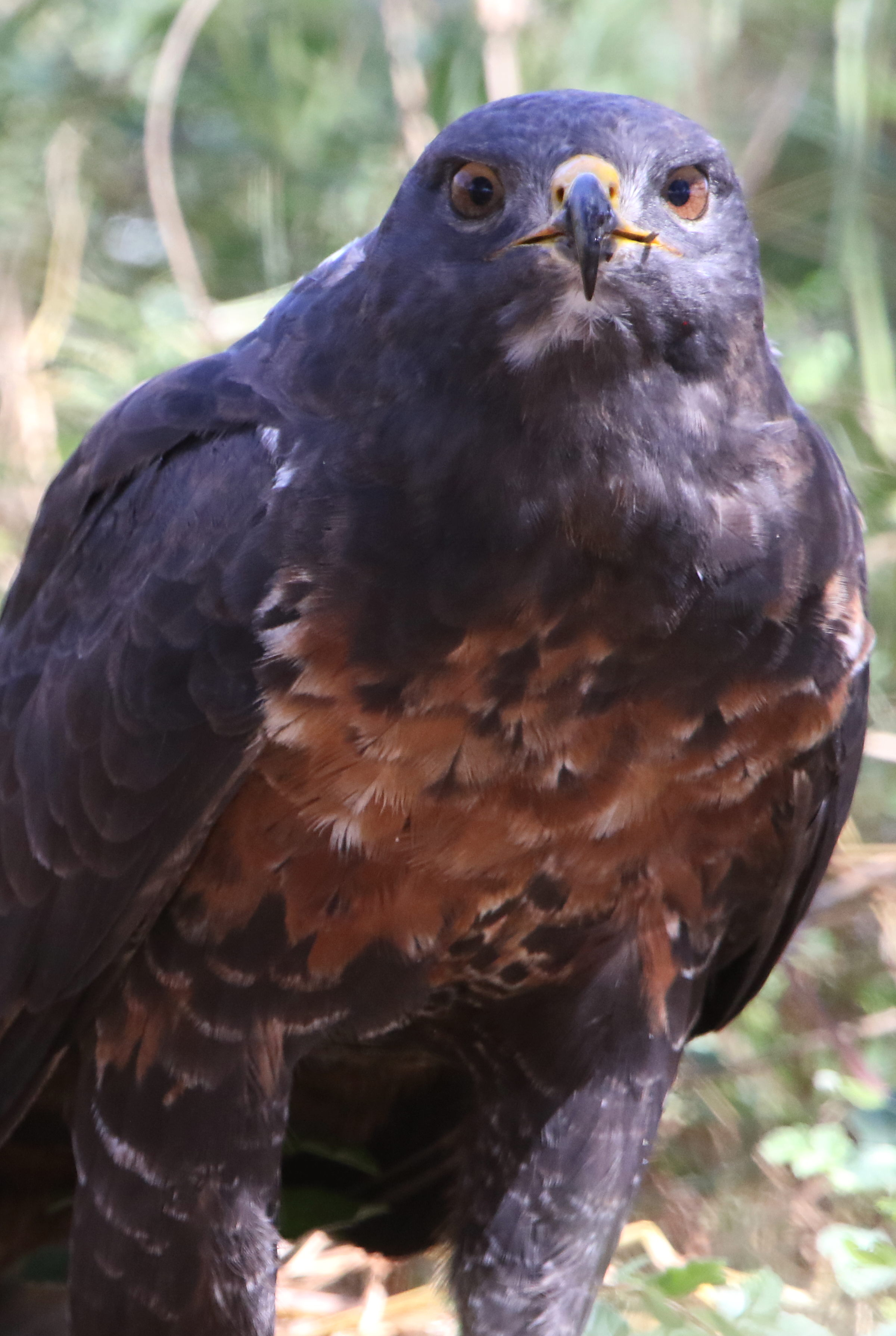
The striking patterns of adult jackal buzzards, blackish and rufous, is distinctive.

The adult jackal buzzard is strikingly plumaged and arguably one of the most "handsome" buzzards. While the upperparts (the head, neck, and throat) are usually slate-grey in colour, the plumage of the underparts show extreme colour polymorphism. Typically, jackal buzzards have a rich rufous breast patch separated from the throat by a white ragged band, and a black-and-white barred belly. In the light and dark (melanistic) morphs respectively, the breast patch is predominantly white or light rufous and predominantly black with little separation between the breast patch and throat. This plumage colour variation is thought to be genetic. A study showed that the Mc1r gene associated with colour polymorphism in other avian species is not associated with colour variation in jackal buzzards thus other genes are likely responsible. The tail of jackal buzzards is typically rufous, the primary flight feathers are blackish and the secondaries off-white, both barred with black. The flight feathers from below present a large white panel, contrasting with black on the hand and black on the tips that form a dark trailing edge to the wing. The jackal buzzard has a very short tail, broad wings, bulky body and large bill compared to most other buzzards (besides the augur buzzard). The juvenile jackal buzzard is mainly brown above and a somewhat washed out rufous-buff brown below, often manifesting worn feathers that appear as lighter buffy or whitish streaking. The tail of the juvenile is usually buff-brown, with or without a somewhat creamy pale tip. The underwing of juvenile has black tips and whitish panel similar to adults but the inside of the wing is rufous-buff (similar to body feathers) streaked with brown.

Sympatric with the jackal buzzard only in Namibia, the augur buzzard is usually distinctly paler at every stage of development than the jackal buzzard, especially lacking the rich underside tones of adults. However, both species have a melanistic form (rather rarer as far as is known in the jackal than the augur buzzard) which are very similar in appearance and may only be told apart by the melanistic augur having slight dark streaking on the white wing panels. An unlikely confusion species is the slightly larger bateleur, given its short rufous tail but the larger-headed, heavier set eagle bears a very distinct and particular head, wing and body shape and obvious distinct colours as adults. The juvenile bateleur may be confused with the similarly brown jackal buzzard but is much more dusky below with rather differing wing colour on its bulging wings.

The jackal buzzard has a call of a sharp, barking quality, weeah ka-ka-ka or kyaahh-ka-ka-ka. The female jackal buzzard voice is deeper than that of the male. The fact that its call is reminiscent of that of black-backed jackal, is believed to be the source of the species' common name. It has a lower tone than the call of the forest buzzard and is very different from the harsh crowing of the augur buzzard. It is also reminiscent of the call of the American red-tailed hawk.

== Range and habitat ==
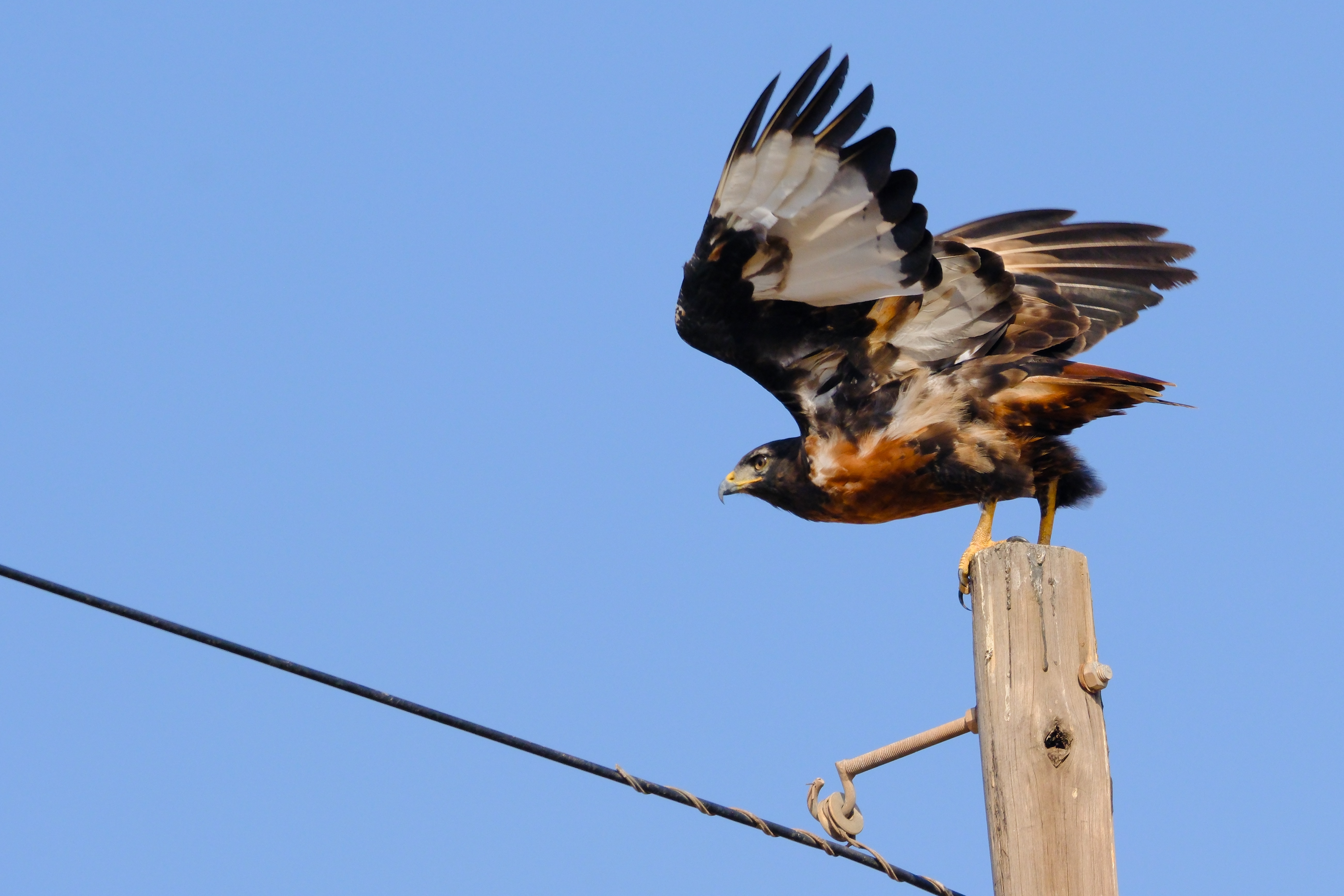
Adult taking off from its perch in Swartland, Western Cape, South Africa

The jackal buzzard is endemic to southern Africa. Despite its limited range, it is a fairly common species of raptor. It inhabits most of South Africa, with an absence at some of the north-central region but common in the northeast of the country. Thence the range extends in the west up to central Namibia and in east through Lesotho and Eswatini into southern Mozambique and, to the west, in extreme southeast Botswana. This is largely a mountain-dwelling species, but can range low rocky outcrops and rubble at sea-level to high mountainous in Lesotho up to 3,500 m (11,500 ft). Jackal buzzards can adapt to both desert-like, arid conditions and areas with high rainfall and verdant plant life. Mostly it prefers to be close to grassland in which to execute most of its hunting. In a study in the Cape Peninsula, jackal buzzards had a low nesting density of only 2.8 pairs/100km^{2} while other studies have shown higher densities of up to 22.2 pairs/100km^{2} such a study in the Lesotho highlands. In the Cape Peninsula, birds showed preference for low-lying and south-facing cliffs for nesting sites.

== Behaviour ==
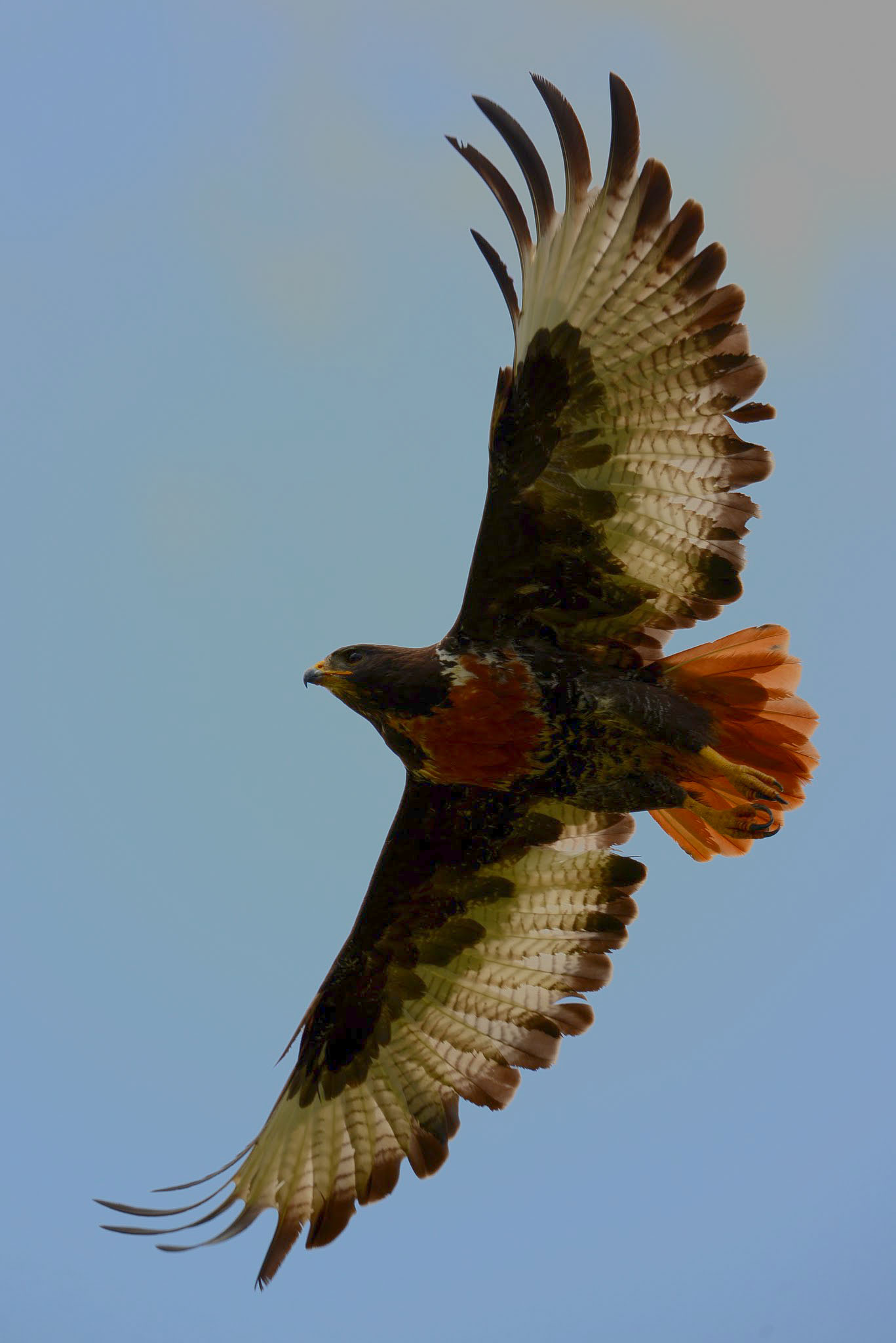
Taking flight near Greyton, South Africa

Pairs have noisy aerial displays, including outside the breeding season. However the aerial display of the pair on territory tends to be much less dramatic than that of the augur buzzard, usually confined to circling or gentle stooping. In a study of five species of African raptor including the jackal buzzard, Lanner falcon (Falco biarmicus), peregrine falcon (Falco peregrinus), black sparrowhawk (Accipiter melanoleucus), and the African hawk-eagle (Aquila spilogaster), the jackal buzzard showed the slowest average (22.65 ± 5.55 km/h) and maximum (48.93 km/h) hunting flight speeds. Note that the above study was based on a single jackal buzzard individual. Jackal buzzards have a relatively large wing area in comparison to the falcon species which reduces their flight speeds. The prey of jackal buzzards is larger and slower than that of falcons and thus speed is less of a necessity.

The breeding season peaks in July to December, but can range from as early as from May to as late as March. The large stick nest is built in a tree or on a crag, and is often reused and enlarged in subsequent seasons. At first construction the nest with average about 60 to 70 cm (24 to 28 in) across and 35 cm (14 in) deep but easily can exceed 1 m (3.3 ft) in diameter with repeated uses. Two creamy or bluish white eggs (or very rarely three) are laid at about three day intervals and incubated by the female only, although food is brought to her on the nest by the male. A surveys of egg sizes show they average 60.7 mm × 47.7 mm (2.39 in × 1.88 in) with a range in height of 57 to 64.9 mm (2.24 to 2.56 in) and in diameter of 45 to 50 mm (1.8 to 2.0 in). The eggs hatch in about 40 days, after a further 56–60 days they can attempt flight. The parents will attack intruders, including humans, who come too close to the nest. Siblicide has been widely reported but, presumably when food supply is ample, nests often produce two fledglings. At 70 days they become independent of the nest, but young birds may then be seen with the adult pair for some time. As in other tropical raptors compared to temperate-zone relatives, the breeding cycle is relatively elongated and clutch size relatively small in the jackal buzzard compared to temperate-zone Buteo species.

== Dietary habits ==
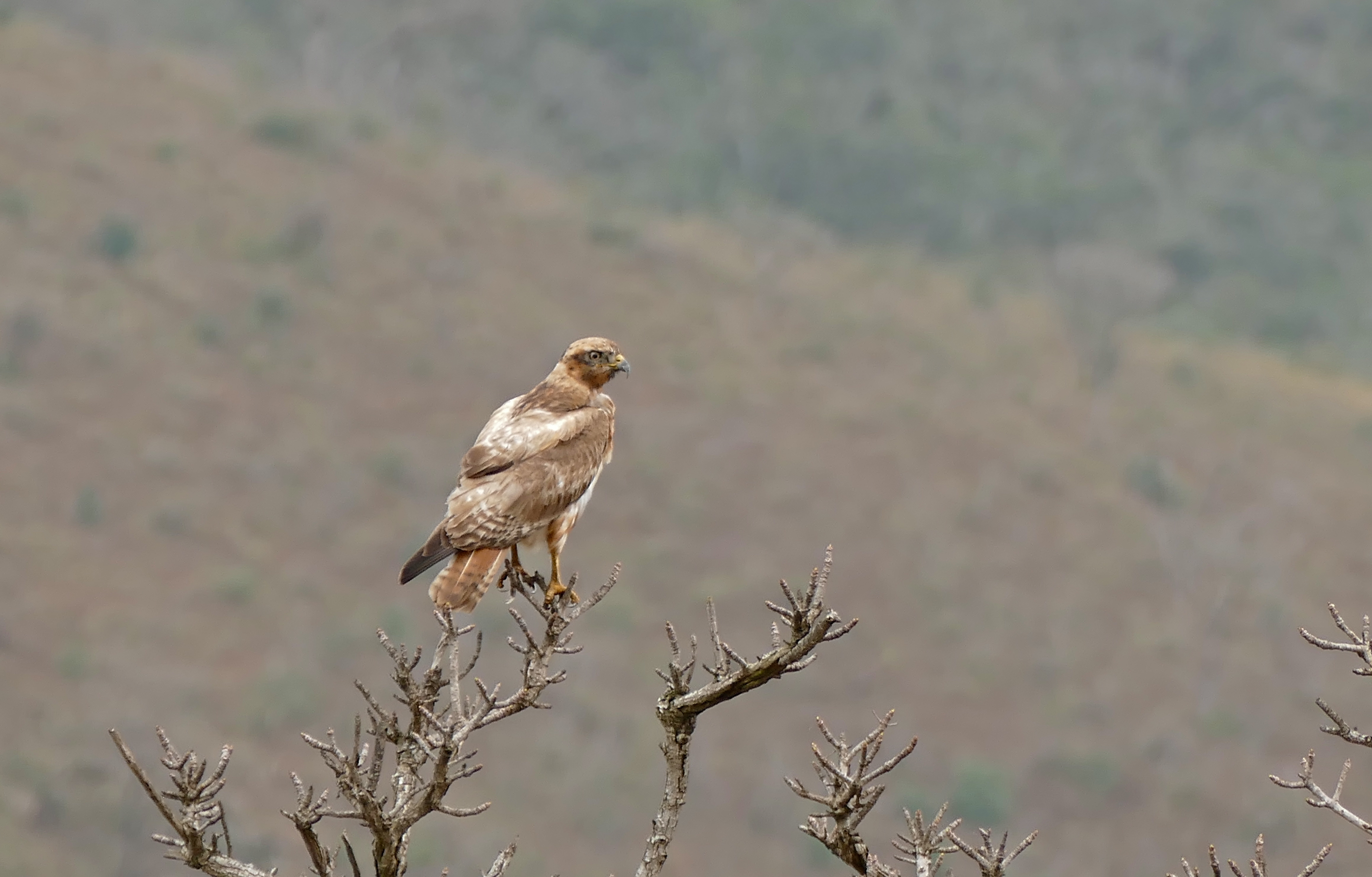
An immature Jackal Buzzard.

The diet of the jackal buzzard is led mainly by small ground mammals, especially rodents. Other prey may include snakes, lizards, ground-feeding birds such as sandgrouse and gamebirds (or alternately the nestlings and fledglings of other birds), insects, and roadkill. Typically, this raptor still-hunts by dropping on its prey from a perch, often either trees or roadside poles or posts. It takes its prey almost exclusively on bare ground, including roads. It also may hunt by soaring or periodically hovering or hanging on updrafts. A study from Grahamstown, South Africa found the prey around nest to consist of assorted rat species (21 items), four-striped grass mouse (8 items) and two golden moles. On evidence, the jackal buzzard mainly takes small mammals during the nesting cycle and then switches to a largely carrion-based diet during the non-breeding season. Jackal buzzards have been recorded at various carrion, including many sheep and goat carcasses and placenta, as well as largely road-killed hares, springhares, springboks and steenboks. Despite being often recorded at carrion, the numerous scavengers in their range, largely vultures, jackals and occasionally hyenas, are larger and often aggressive towards other scavengers. Therefore, the jackal buzzard either only comes to carrion when other scavengers are done feasting or are entirely absent. They have an advantage in being less shy towards humans than larger birds of prey and scavengers and may be able to come to road-kills more quickly and may also gain an advantage in accessing large carcasses that they may not be able to penetrate without larger scavengers opening them up first. Larger and/or more dangerous live prey recorded to be taken by jackal buzzards has included adults of birds such as francolins and marsh owls, adult puff adders, adult greater cane rats and largely or exclusively the young of various mongoose, monitor lizards and Cape hyraxes.

== Threats ==
Although quite common and adaptable, jackal buzzards are not infrequently endangered by large man-made objects such as wind turbines, power-lines and steep-sided, massive reservoirs, in addition to poisoning of carcasses (targeted at jackals). An analysis of avian deaths at wind energy facilities across southwestern South Africa showed that jackal buzzards are the species killed most often by turbine collisions yet more than half of the stakeholders of wind energy facilities are unaware of this. Vehicle collisions are also a threat to jackal buzzards likely because the birds forage alongside roads. A disproportionate number of birds of this species are killed by vehicles on roads in the Karoo relative to other raptor species . Over a two year period, more than 10% of admissions of raptors to a raptor rehabilitation centre in Pietermaritzburg were jackal buzzards, many as a result of vehicle collisions.
