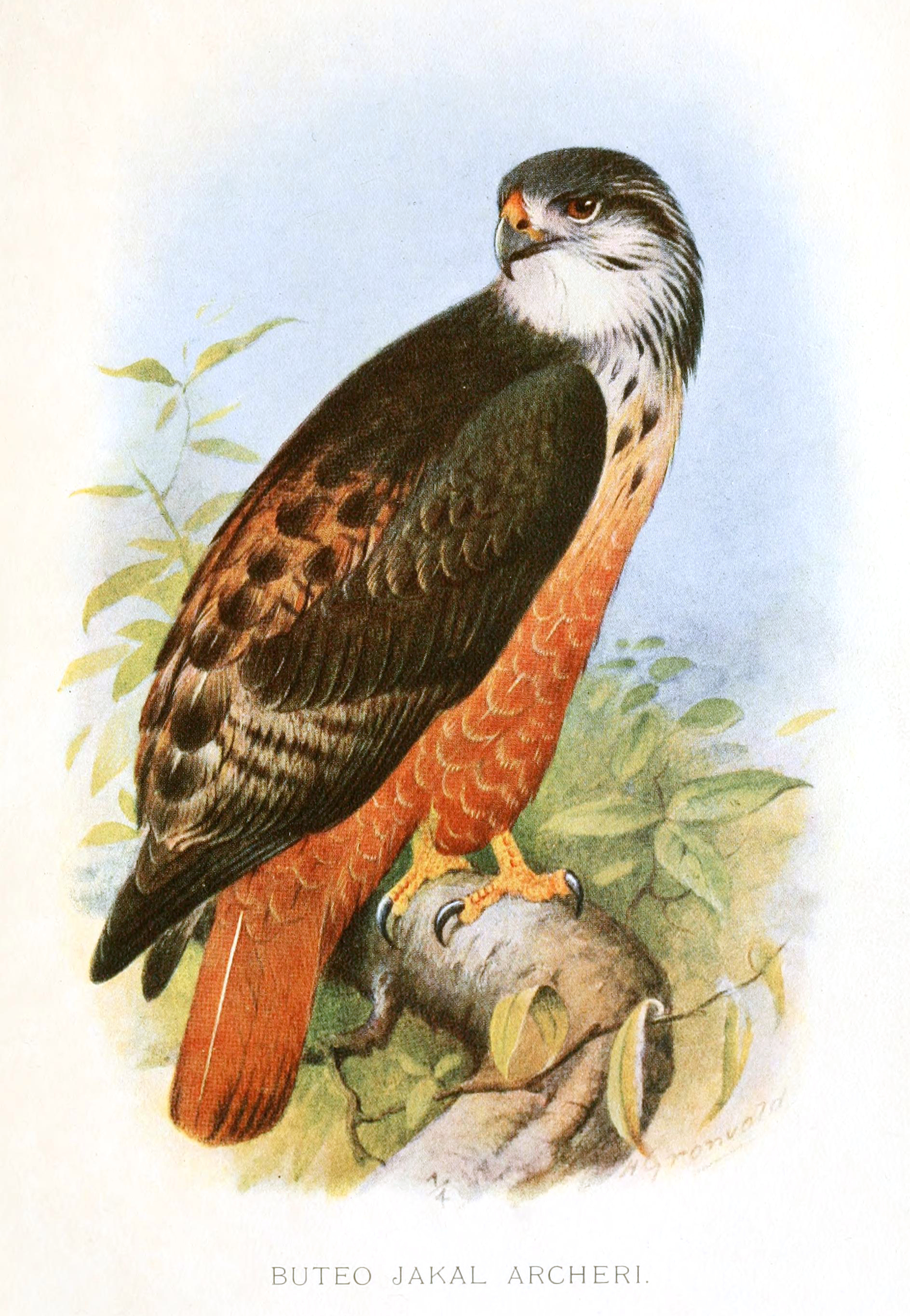

Scientific classification
- Domain: Eukaryota
- Kingdom: Animalia
- Phylum: Chordata
- Class: Aves
- Order: Accipitriformes
- Family: Accipitridae
- Genus: Buteo
- Species: B. augur
- Subspecies: B. a. archeri

Trinomial name
- Buteo augur archeri WL Sclater, 1917

Synonyms
- Buteo archeri

= Archer's buzzard =

Species of bird

Archer's buzzard (Buteo augur archeri) is a subspecies of the augur buzzard that is endemic to Somalia. The bird's common name and Latin binomial commemorate the British explorer and colonial official Sir Geoffrey Francis Archer.

== Taxonomy ==
The status of this taxon has been disputed, with some taxonomists considering this species, the jackal buzzard, and the augur buzzard to be the same species. Previously, many taxonomists consider them all to be distinct, having different calls, different home ranges and slight variations in plumage. In 2013, BirdLife International synonymized it with the augur buzzard. The International Ornithological Congress also followed in 2022, but tentatively classified it as a subspecies of the augur buzzard. However, it may simply represent a color morph.

== Description ==
It is 50–55 cm (20–22 in) long and the adult has distinctive reddish plumage. The adult Archer's buzzard is strikingly plumaged. It is dark brown above with a dark tail. It has chestnut underparts, and rufous feathers above. It has white throat with black streaking. Juvenile birds are pale rufous to white below with sparse streaking on the upper breast.

== Habitat ==
In its restricted range it is found in mountains and adjacent savanna and grassland. It is resident and non-migratory throughout its range.

== Diet ==
The diet of the Archer's buzzard is mainly small ground mammals, but snakes, lizards, small ground birds, and insects. Typically, the raptor drops on its prey from a perch or hover.
