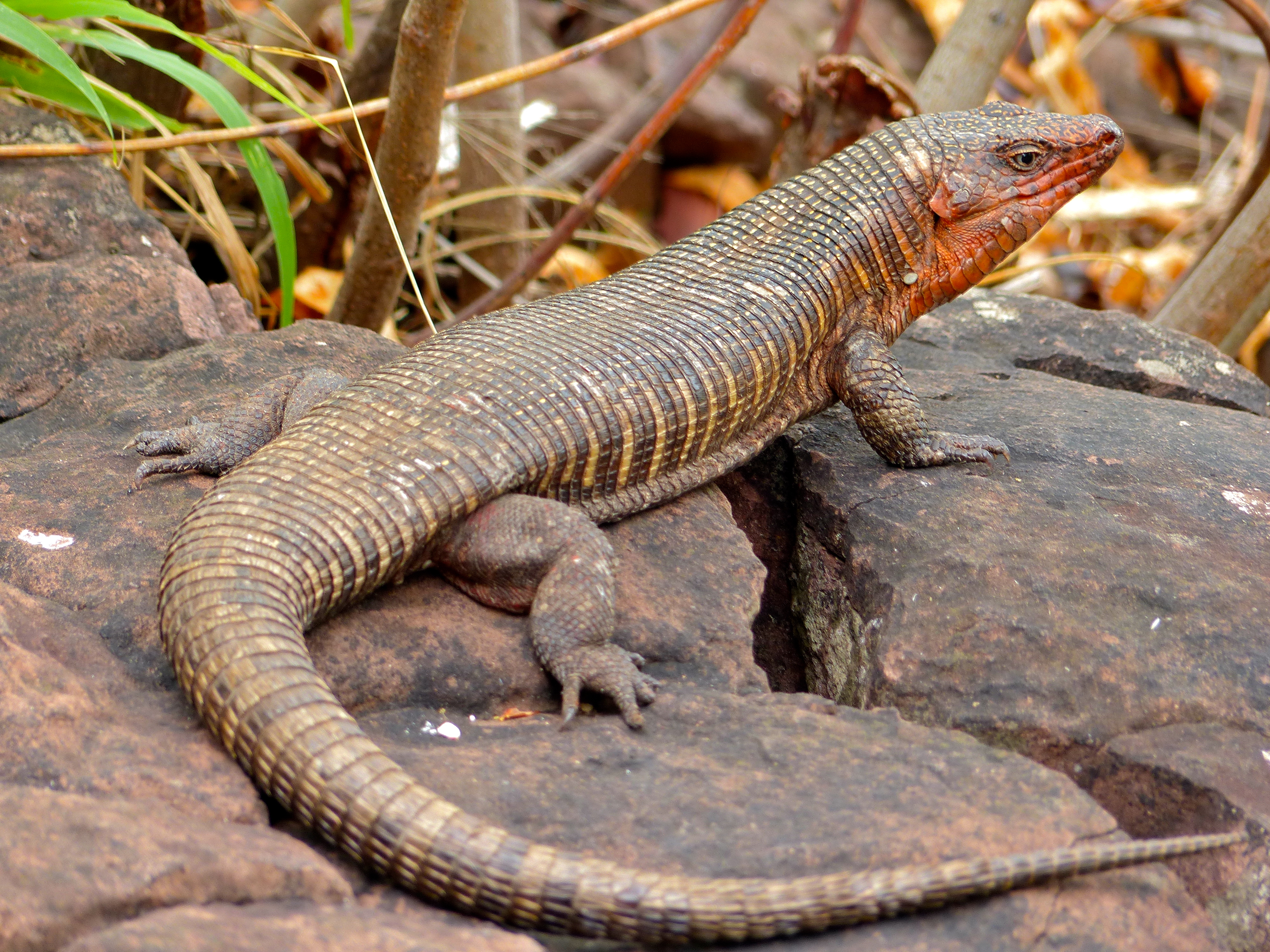

Conservation status
- Least Concern (IUCN 3.1)

Scientific classification
- Kingdom: Animalia
- Phylum: Chordata
- Class: Reptilia
- Order: Squamata
- Family: Gerrhosauridae
- Genus: Matobosaurus
- Species: M. validus

Binomial name
- Matobosaurus validus (A.Smith, 1849)

Synonyms
- Gerrhosaurus validus

= Giant plated lizard =

Species of lizard

The giant plated lizard (Matobosaurus validus) is a lizard in the family Gerrhosauridae, which is found in dry to mesic habitats of southern Africa. They are wary and stay close to their rocky retreats.

== Physical attributes ==
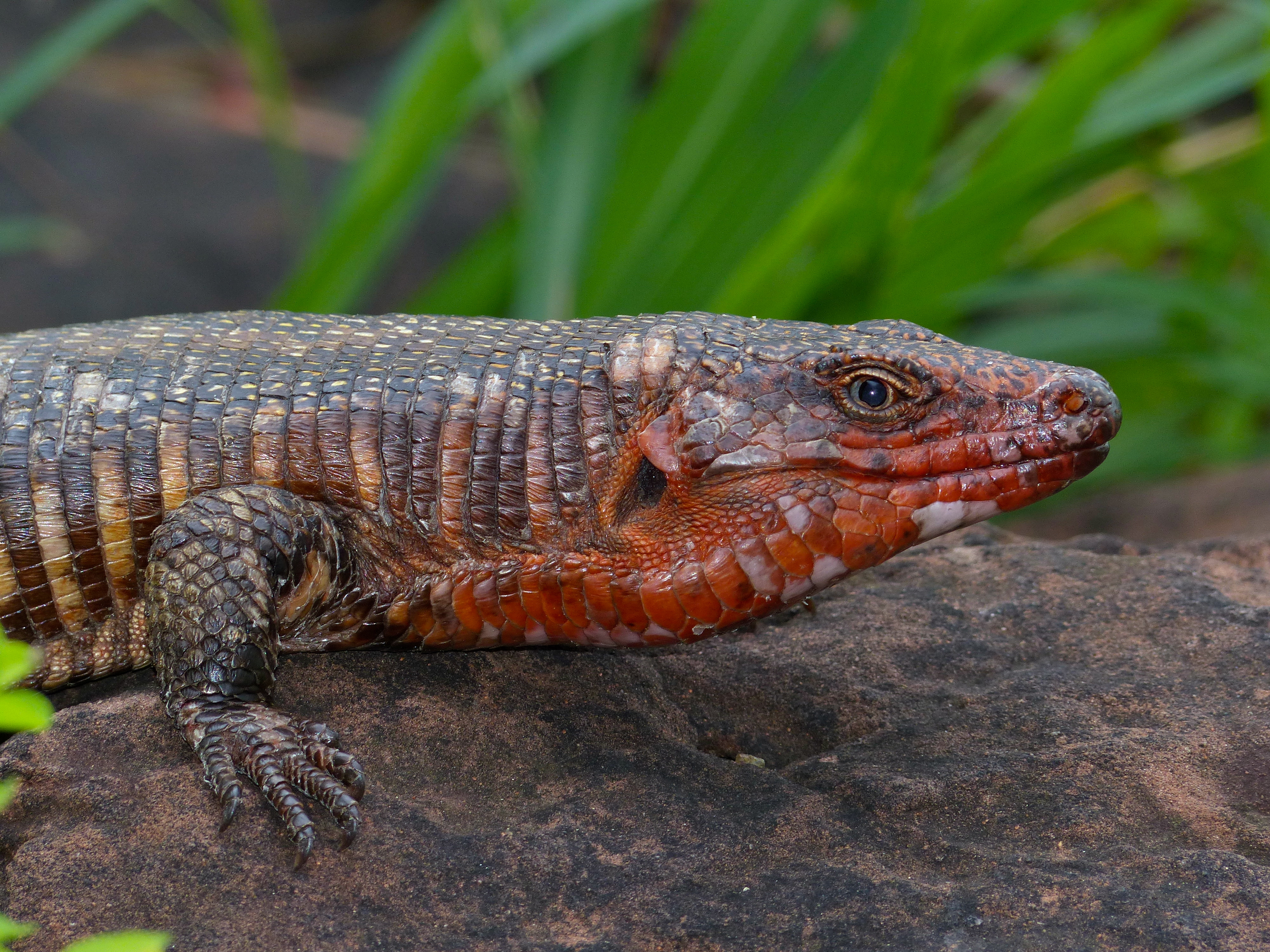
Close-up of breeding male

video of Matobosaurus validus in the Wuppertal, Germany zoo

A large lizard with a flattened head and body with a total length of up to 69 cm (27 in) or even 75 cm (29.5 in) and a snout-vent length (SVL) of 28 cm (11 in). The soles of the feet have black rubber-like balls, an adaptation to living on rock outcrops. It is called the plated lizard because of the platelike scales on the back. This lizard is very shy and hard to approach. When threatened, it will jam itself into rock crevices (aided by its flattened body) and inflate with air, making it impossible to extricate it.

It is omnivorous, consuming a fair amount of plant matter in addition to insects and even baby tortoises. It also tends to form loose colonies.
