= Neeruti Landscape Conservation Area =

Protected area in Estonia

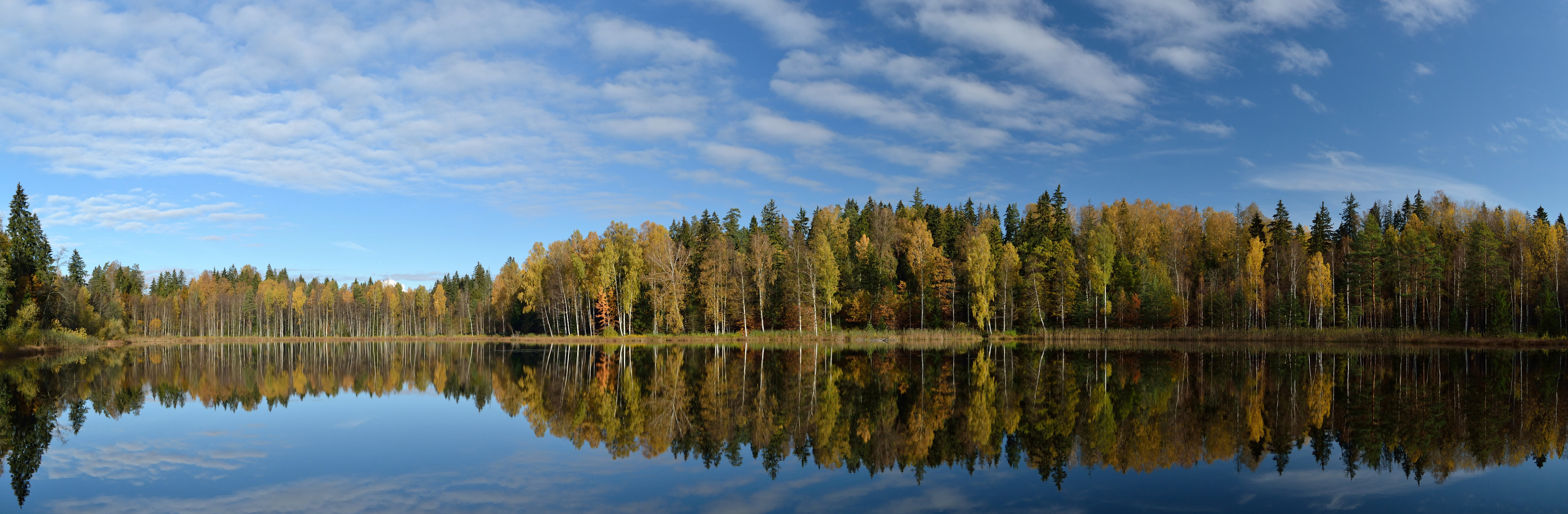

- Location within Estonia
- Location: Estonia
- Coordinates: 59°17′40″N 26°08′00″E
- Area: 1,250 ha (3,100 acres)
- Established: 1957 (2017)

Neeruti Landscape Conservation Area is a nature park which is located in Lääne-Viru County, Estonia.

The area of the nature park is 1250 ha.

The protected area was founded in 1957 to protect Neeruti Hills and its surrounding areas. In 1999, the protected area was designated as a landscape conservation area.

The Neeruti Hills hide what is believed to be the oldest known nest of the common buzzard, discovered by Marek Vahula in 1982.
