= List of plantations in the United States =

This is a list of plantations and/or plantation houses in the United States of America that are national memorials, National Historic Landmarks, listed on the National Register of Historic Places or other heritage register, or are otherwise significant for their history, association with significant events or people, or their architecture and design.

Color key	Historic register listing
	National Historic Landmark
	National Register of Historic Places
	National Historic Site
	Not listed

== Arkansas ==
NRHP reference number	Name	Image	Date designated	Locality	County	Notes
75000397	Dortch Plantation		December 6, 1975	Scott; 34.71528°N 92.05361°W	Lonoke	Built 1904
	Florence Plantation			Harwood	Chicot	
72000201	Frog Level (Bussey, Arkansas)		September 2, 1972	Bussey; 33°16′43″N 93°21′1″W	Columbia	Built 1852
	Harris Plantation				Ashley	
	Hollywood Plantation				Drew	
74000466	Lakeport Plantation		November 20, 1974	Shives; 33.25667°N 91.15528°W	Chicot	Built 1850
99000044	Land's End Plantation		January 27, 1999	Scott; 34.89333°N 92.11889°W	Pulaski	Built 1925
77000254	Morrison Plantation		December 28, 1977	Saginaw; 34.27°N 92.94722°W	Hot Spring	Built 1854
	Sunnyside Plantation			Lake Village	Chicot	Built c. 1820–1830
03001451	Rosedale		January 21, 2004	Arkadelphia; 34.161389°N 93.101944°W	Clark	Built 1860

== Delaware ==
NRHP reference number	Name	Image	Date designated	Locality	County	Notes
70000170	Aspendale	1982 HABS photo	April 15, 1970	Kenton; 39.10278°N 75.44944°W	Kent	Built 1773
74000602	Hagley		December 2, 1974	Montchanin; 39.78422°N 75.66222°W	New Castle	Built 1795
72000292	Lombardy Hall		December 2, 1974	Wilmington; 39.77949°N 75.54472°W	New Castle	Built 1750
66000258	Poplar Hall	1982 HABS photo	January 20, 1961	Dover; 39.10277°N 75.44944°W	Kent	Built 1740, also known as the John Dickinson House.
73000524	Stonum	1982 HABS photo	November 7, 1973	New Castle; 39.66022°N 75.57602°W	New Castle	Built 1750

== Florida ==
NRHP reference number	Name	Image	Date designated	Locality	County	Notes
02000606	Bannerman Plantation		June 6, 2002	Tallahassee; 30.64500°N 84.27889°W	Leon	Built 1852
99000712	Blackwood-Harwood Plantations		October 6, 1999	Tallahassee; 30.48694°N 84.35027°W	Leon	1830s
70000185	Bulow Plantation Ruins		September 29, 1970	Flagler Beach; 29.43611°N 81.14111°W	Flagler	Built 1821, destroyed 1836 during Second Seminole War
02000002	Burn Brae Plantation-Krueger House			Stuart	Martin	
73000606	Dunlawton Plantation and Sugar Mill			Port Orange	Volusia	
	Casa Bianca Plantation			Monticello vicinity	Jefferson	
	El Destino Plantation			Monticello vicinity	Jefferson	
	Evergreen Hills Plantation			Tallahassee	Leon	
	Francis Eppes Plantation			Tallahassee	Leon	
70000189	Gamble Plantation		August 12, 1970	Ellenton	Manatee	The house sheltered Confederate statesman Judah P. Benjamin in 1865, before he departed for England.
	Hibernia Plantation			Fleming Island	Clay	House is no longer standing but the family cemetery, private chapel exist still.
02000836	Killearn Plantation Archeological and Historic District			Tallahassee	Leon	
70000182	Kingsley Plantation			Jacksonville	Duval	
	Kinhega Lodge			Tallahassee vicinity	Leon	
	La Grange Plantation			Tallahassee vicinity	Leon	
	Lipona Plantation			Monticello vicinity	Jefferson	
73000582	Lyndhurst Plantation			Monticello	Jefferson	
04000142	Mala Compra Plantation Archeological Site			Palm Coast	Flagler	
	New Switzerland Plantation			Switzerland	St Johns	The home was destroyed during the East Florida patriot revolt in 1812.
	Oaklawn Plantation			Tallahassee vicinity	Leon	
72000311	Red Bank Plantation			Jacksonville	Duval	
	Rose Hill Plantation			Tallahassee vicinity	Leon	
89000240	Tall Timbers Plantation			Tallahassee	Leon	
	Welaunee Plantation			Wacissa vicinity	Jefferson	

== Hawaii ==
NRHP reference number	Name	Image	Date designated	Locality	County	Notes
93000774, 93000775, 93000777,	Kilauea Plantation		1983	Kīlauea	Kauaʻi	Sugar cane plantation that operated from 1880 to 1971; 5 historic buildings NRHP-listed: Manager's House, Head Luna's House, Head Bookkeeper's House, Kilauea School, Kong Lung Store
66000296	Old Sugar Mill of Koloa		December 29, 1962	Kōloa; 21.90972°N 159.46916°W	Kauaʻi	

== Maryland ==
NRHP reference number	Name	Image	Date designated	Locality	County	
75000866	Ballestone Mansion	EssexMD BallestoneStansburyHouse1	June 18, 1975	Essex	Baltimore	
71000376	Doughoregan Manor		November 11, 1971	Ellicott City; 39.27667°N 76.89306°W	Howard	
72001595	Habre-de-venture		November 11, 1971	Port Tobacco; 38.52871°N 77.03155°W	Charles	
66000389	Hampton Mansion		October 15, 1966	Towson	Baltimore	
74002341	Howard's Adventure		October 16, 1974	Gambrills	Anne Arundel	Property is now delisted after arson damage.
70000853	His Lordship's Kindness	1936 HABS photo	April 15, 1970	Rosaryville; 38.77889°N 76.84278°W	Prince George's	
75000926	Magnolia Plantation			Knoxville	Washington	
94001643	Mansion House (Public Landing, Maryland)		January 19, 1995	Public Landing	Worcester	
91001420	Merry Sherwood		September 20, 1991	Berlin	Worcester	
70000852	Montpelier		April 15, 1970	Laurel; 39.06491°N 76.84503°W	Prince George's	
70000860	Mount Clare	1958 HABS photo	April 15, 1970	Baltimore; 39.27897°N 76.64293°W	Independent city	
74000945	Mount Harmon	Mt. Harmon Earleville HABS1	June 5, 1974	Earleville	Cecil	
80001796	Perry Hall Mansion	Perry Hall Mansion Dec 09	April 23, 1980	Perry Hall	Baltimore	
84001874	Pomfret Plantation			Marion	Somerset	
76002168	Pleasant Prospect		April 30, 1976	Bowie38.934444°N 76.783333°W	Prince George's	
	Rackliffe House (Assateague State Park)	Rackliffe House MD3		Berlin	Worcester	
73002166	Riversdale Mansion		December 9, 1997	Riverdale38.96024°N 76.93181°W	Prince George's	
75000919	Salisbury Plantation			Westover	Somerset	
90000608	Sion Hill	1936 HABS photo	April 27, 1992	Havre De Grace; 39.56484°N 76.12856°W	Harford	
72001487	Sotterley		February 16, 2000	Hollywood; 38.37972°N 76.53889°W	St. Mary's	
70000261	Tulip Hill	1936 HABS photo	April 15, 1970	Galesville; 38.85083°N 76.55056°W	Anne Arundel	
70000854	West St. Mary's Manor	HABS photo	April 15, 1970	Drayden; 38.18318°N 76.44875°W	St. Mary's	
66000387	Whitehall	1936 HABS photo	October 9, 1960	Annapolis; 39.00453°N 76.42895°W	Anne Arundel	
70000264	Wye Plantation		April 15, 1970	Easton; 38.85344°N 76.16834°W	Talbot	
70000264	Wyoming Farm		1980	Prince George's County; 38.4338°N 76.559°W	Prince George's	

== Missouri ==
NRHP reference number	Name	Image	Date designated	Locality	County	Notes
69000105	Alfred W. Morrison House		April 16, 1969	Fayette vicinity	Howard	Also known as Lilac Hill.
97001435	George A. Murrell House		November 14, 1997	Napton vicinity	Saline	Also known as Oak Grove
79001347	Greenwood (Columbia, Missouri)		January 15, 1979	Columbia	Boone	Also known as Greenwood Heights
83000994	Greenwood (Fayette, Missouri)		March 29, 1983	Fayette vicinity	Howard	Also known as the Estill-Parrish House
12000563	Hunter-Dawson House		August 28, 2012	New Madrid	New Madrid	Also known as the Hunter-Dawson State Historic Site
70000348	William B. Sappington House		January 21, 1970	Arrow Rock vicinity	Saline	Also known as Prairie Park
79003205	White Haven	green wooden building, large driveway, trees	June 23, 1986	Grantwood Village	St. Louis	Also known as Ulysses S. Grant National Historic Site
88003244	Wilson Larimore House		February 10, 1989	Bellefontaine Neighbors	St. Louis	

== Oklahoma ==
NRHP reference number	Name	Image	Date designated	Locality	County	Notes
70000530	Murrell Home	Murrell Home	May 30, 1974	Park Hill; 35.84735°N 94.96418°W	Cherokee	Built in 1845

== Tennessee ==
NRHP reference number	Name	Image	Date designated	Locality	County	Notes
05001027	Airdrie		September 15, 2005	Nashville	Davidson	Also known as Petway House or the Buell-King House.
89000503	Beaver Dam Plantation		June 16, 1989	Woodbury	Cannon	Also known as the William Cannon Houston House.
07001163	Beech Grove		November 8, 2007	Nashville	Davidson	
75001741	Beechwood Hall		1975	Newport	Cocke	
69000177	Belle Meade Plantation		December 30, 1969	Belle Meade	Davidson	
73001758	Belle Vue		October 25, 1973	Bellevue	Davidson	
75001780	Brabson's Ferry Plantation		June 25, 1975	Sevierville	Sevier	
73001857	Carnton		January 18, 1973	Franklin	Williamson	
73001767	Clifton Place		April 11, 1973	Wales	Giles	
75001747 / 100003900	Clover Bottom Plantation		April 3, 1975 / May 7, 2019	Nashville	Davidson	
75001787	Davies Manor		March 19, 1975	Memphis	Shelby	
85000669	DeVault-Massengill House		March 28, 1985	Piney Flats	Sullivan	Also known as Mary Lou Farms.
73001823	Elmwood		October 15, 1973	Murfreesboro	Rutherford	
75002162	Fairvue			Gallatin	Sumner	
66000722	The Hermitage	Oblique front photograph of the Hermitage, showing the false-front architectural style.	December 19, 1960	Nashville; 36.21497°N 86.61297°W	Davidson	
88000363	H. G. W. Mayberry House		April 13, 1988	Franklin	Williamson	Constructed in 1856. Also known as Beechwood Hall.
10000141	Hall-Harding-McCampbell House		March 23, 2010	Nashville	Davidson	
75001766	Harris-Holden House		March 19, 1975	Howell	Lincoln	
75002162	Isaac Franklin Plantation		April 4, 2005	Gallatin	Sumner	Also known as Fairvue.
78002637	James Bradley House		September 18, 1978	Dixon Springs	Smith	
76001766	Kincaid-Howard House		March 16, 1976	Fincastle	Campbell	
77001269	Lucerne		December 23, 1977	Brownsville	Haywood	
	Mabry Hood House				Knox	Demolished in the 1990s.
78002587	Miller House		December 8, 1978	Elba	Fayette	
75001795	Northcutt Plantation		May 12, 1975	McMinnville	Warren	
13000125	Oak Hill Farm		March 27, 2013	Stanton	Haywood and Tipton	A Tennessee Century Farm for continuous agricultural production since the 1830s.
71001072	Pinewood Mansion			Nunnelly	Hickman	Burned down in 1975.
69000180	Ramsey House		December 23, 1969	Knoxville	Knox	
71000825	Rattle and Snap	Rattle and Snap	November 11, 1971	Columbia; 35.56056°N 87.15333°W	Maury	
80003875	Rhodes House		April 30, 1980	Brighton	Tipton	
75001781	Rose Glen		July 18, 1975	Sevierville	Sevier	
77001283	Skipwith Hall		November 23, 1978	Columbia	Maury	Also known as Oakwood Farm.
69000179	Travellers Rest		December 30, 1969	Nashville	Davidson	
84003641	Walnut Grove		March 8, 1984	Mount Pleasant	Maury	
71000830	Wessyngton		May 6, 1971	Cedar Hill	Robertson	
75001785	Wheatlands		July 7, 1975	Sevierville	Sevier	
09000538	White Plains		August 11, 2009	Algood	Putnam	
95001044	William Washington Seay House		August 25, 1995	Flat Rock	Wilson	
	Westover Plantation			Robertson Island	Davidson	
	Craighead House			Nashville	Davidson	Part of the Richland-West End Historic District
	Burlington			Nashville	Davidson	Also known as the Elliston-Farrell House. The house was dismantled in 1932.
	Ashwood Hall			Columbia	Maury	Demolished. in 1874.

== Texas ==
NRHP reference number	Name	Image	Date designated	Locality	County	Notes
83003084	Col. Elijah Sterling Clack Robertson Plantation		April 5, 1983	Salado	Bell	
80004081	Durazno Plantation		September 2, 1980	Jones Creek	Brazoria	
69000209	Freeman Plantation		November 25, 1969	Jefferson	Marion	
71000971	Hatfield Plantation			Brenham	Washington	
05000244	Lamar–Calder House		March 30, 2005	Richmond	Fort Bend	
71000970	Liendo Plantation		June 21, 1971	Hempstead	Waller	
14000104	Monte Verdi Plantation		March 31, 2014	Cushing	Rusk County	
75001961	Old Brulay Plantation		October 10, 1975	Brownsville	Cameron	
12001250	Seward Plantation		January 29, 2013	Independence	Washington	
80004082	Varner-Hogg Plantation		April 9, 1980	West Columbia	Brazoria	
77001474	William Garrett Plantation House		March 25, 1977	San Augustine	San Augustine	
	Glenblythe Plantation			Gay Hill	Washington	
	Hawkins Ranch				Matagorda	also known as Hawkins Plantation.
	Levi Jordan Plantation			Brazoria	Brazoria	
	Peach Point Plantation			Jones Creek	Brazoria	

== U.S. Virgin Islands ==
As of 1728, there were 91 plantation lots defined on Saint John, U.S. Virgin Islands. As of 1800, maps showed 68 plantations outside the villages of Cruz and Coral Bay. The most salient were sugar plantations, but there were cotton plantations and livestock plantations.

NRHP reference number	Name	Image	Date designated	Locality	County	Notes
81000090	Annaberg Historic District		July 23, 1981	Maho Bay	Saint John	Ruins of the Annaberg sugar plantation.
81000089	Brown Bay Plantation Historic District		July 23, 1981	Brown Bay	Saint John	
78000269	Cinnamon Bay Plantation		July 11, 1978	Cruz Bay	Saint John	
78000270	Catherineberg Sugar Mill Ruins		March 30, 1978	Cruz Bay	Saint John	Example of an 18th-century rum factory, and ruins of a sugar plantation.
76002217	Estate Carolina Sugar Plantation		July 19, 1976	Coral Bay	Saint John	
78000272	Mary Point Estate		May 22, 1978	Mary Point	Saint John	
81000094	Hermitage Plantation Historic District			Coral Bay	Saint John	
81000093	Rustenberg Plantation South Historic District			Cinnamon Bay	Saint John	
78002732	Mafolie Great House		February 17, 1978	Charlotte Amalie	Saint Thomas	Originally part of Estate Catherineberg.
78000271	Lameshur Plantation		June 23, 1978	Cruz Bay	Saint Thomas	
76001867	Tutu Plantation House		July 12, 1976	Charlotte Amalie	Saint Thomas	
76001841	Coakley Bay Estate		July 23, 1976	Christiansted	Saint Croix	
78002721	Estate Grove Place		July 17, 1978	Frederiksted	Saint Croix	
78002723	Estate Hogansborg		February 17, 1978	Frederiksted	Saint Croix	The island's first steam-powered sugar factory.
78002717	Estate Judith's Fancy		July 17, 1978	Christiansted	Saint Croix	
80003995	Estate Little Princess		June 9, 1980	Christiansted	Saint Croix	
86003351	Estate Saint George Historic District		October 24, 1986	Fredericksted	Saint Croix	
76001850	Sion Hill Estate		July 19, 1976	Fredericksted	Saint Croix	
76001858	Whim Plantation		July 30, 1976	Frederiksted	Saint Croix	
