= List of plantations in Arkansas =

This is a list of plantations and/or plantation houses in the U.S. state of Arkansas that are listed on the National Register of Historic Places, listed on the Arkansas Register of Historic Places, or are otherwise significant for their history, association with significant events or people, or their architecture and design.

Arkansas does not have any plantations listed as National Historic Landmarks.

| Color key | Historic register listing |
|---|---|
| | National Register of Historic Places |
| | Contributing property to a National Register of Historic Places historic district |
| | Arkansas Register of Historic Places |
| | Arkansas Century Farm (Arkansas Department of Agriculture) |
| | Not listed on national or state register |

| Historic register/ Reference number | Name | Image | Locality | County | Notes |
|---|---|---|---|---|---|
| 75000397 | Dortch Plantation | | Scott; 34.715278°N 92.053611°W | Lonoke | Also known as Marlsgate Plantation. |
| 72000201 | Frog Level | | Bussey; 33.278611°N 93.350278°W | Columbia | |
| 95001141 | John P. Fisher House | | Portland; 33.238611°N 91.537778°W | Ashley | Also known as the Moats House |
| | Florence Plantation | | Harwood; 33.179°N 91.152°W | Chicot | |
| 74000466 | Lakeport Plantation | | Shives vicinity 33.256667°N 91.155278°W | Chicot | Opened as a museum by Arkansas State University in 2008. Preserved as part of Save America's Treasures program. |
| 78000597 | Roselawn | | Altheimer; 34.307222°N 91.859444°W | Jefferson | |
| | Sunnyside Plantation | | Lake Village; 33.316667°N 91.233333°W | Chicot | |
| 78000596 | The Elms | | Altheimer; 34.304167°N 91.8425°W | Jefferson | Now used as a duck hunting lodge in the Mississippi Flyway. |
| | Wilson | | Wilson; 35.566111°N 90.043056°W | Mississippi | Wilson started as a company town in 1886 by Robert E. Lee Wilson for workers on the Wilson estate |

== See also ==
- History of slavery in Arkansas
- List of plantations in the United States
