= Fortunato Teho =

Fortunato Teho (1908–1986) was a well-known horticultural writer, broadcaster, educator and publicist in Hawaii from the late 1940s to the mid-1980s. Teho was the first Filipino to graduate from the University of Hawaii; and he was the first Filipino in Hawaii to become a naturalized American citizen.

== Life and career ==
Teho was born in Manila in 1908. In 1911, his parents, Amando Teho and Benita Garcia, migrated to Hawaii and enrolled their son in public school on the island of Kauai. In 1919, Teho was awarded a scholarship to Mid-Pacific Institute in Honolulu for his high-school years, graduating in 1923. Teho then enrolled at the University of Hawaii, graduating in 1927 with a B.S. degree in agricultural sugar technology. Teho was the first Filipino to graduate from the University of Hawaii.

For several years, Teho worked for sugar companies as an agriculturalist. During this time, he gained some journalistic experience as writer-editor of a local newspaper; after World War II, he wrote newspaper dispatches while serving as liaison for the Hawaii Sugar Planters Association bringing workers from the Philippines to work in the sugar industry in Hawaii.

In 1945, Fortunato Teho was a member of the Filipino delegation to Washington, DC, to make the case for naturalization of Philippines-born nationals. And in 1948, Teho was the first Filipino in Hawaii to become a naturalized United States citizen.

In 1948, Teho was hired as a publicist for the University of Hawaii, College of Tropical Agriculture Extension Service. In 1957, Teho initiated the first radio agricultural broadcast in Hawaii. First aimed at the agricultural industry, the program soon was broadened to appeal to home gardeners and gained a wide audience. In 1958, Teho began broadcasting on television as well, and his programs were widely viewed throughout Hawaii for many years.

During this time, Teho also began writing regular gardening columns for newspapers throughout the state of Hawaii, including the Honolulu Advertiser and Star-Bulletin, the Hilo Hawaii Tribune-Herald, the Maui News and the Kauai Garden Island. In 1971, a collection of Teho's garden columns was published as Plants of Hawaii – How to Grow Them. The book was very successful and continues to be available.

As part of his work for UH Extension, Teho brought the convention of the National Association of Farm Broadcasters to Honolulu in 1969. He also served as president of the Western Garden Writers Association in 1980.

In 1982, Teho received the Garden Communicators’ Award from the National Association of Nurserymen, the oldest and most prestigious award the horticultural industry gives for outstanding garden writing and communication—and the first recognition by that organization of an agricultural expert from Hawaii.

Fortunato Teho died in 1986 of cancer. He was survived by his wife of 59 years, Susannah Ventura Teho; four children, Fortunato Teho, Jr., Susannah Villa, Barbara Shupp, and Patricia Teho; and many grandchildren.

Teho was widely eulogized as a memorable man who did much to keep Hawaii beautiful and productive.

At the time of his death, Teho left an introduction and outline for a new book on Hawaii horticulture he proposed to call Making the Most of Your Hawaii Yard – How to Cultivate Food and Flowers in Your Living Space. In the Introduction, the author proposed, “Consider turning your small lot, or acre, into a kitchen garden, a miniature orchard, an herbal boutique and a floral nursery.” Near the end of his life, then, Fortunato Teho came to embrace what years later would be called “sustainable horticulture.”
