= McCampbell =

McCampbell may refer to:

== People with the surname ==
- Artis J. McCampbell (born 1953), American politician
- David McCampbell (1910-1996), American pilot

== Locations ==
- McCampbell–Porter Airport, an airport in Texas, USA.
- Hall-Harding-McCampbell House, a historic house in Tennessee, USA.

== Other ==
- USS McCampbell, a ship
