= Mary Point, U.S. Virgin Islands =

Coordinates: 18°21′55″N 64°44′30″W

Mary Point is an uninhabited peninsula on the island of Saint John in the United States Virgin Islands. There are no roads or trails and steep cliffs prevent access from the water. Although Mary Point once housed a small sugar cane plantation, the area is now overgrown with thick forest. The foundation and crumbling walls of Mary Point Estate can be seen from the Francis Bay trail. It is part of Virgin Islands National Park. Mary Creek, the shallow bay on the east side, is a popular spot for fly fishing and kitesurfing.
