= The Garden Island =

Daily newspaper based in Lihue, Hawaii

- Type: Daily newspaper
- Owner: Oahu Publications
- Founder: Sometaro Sheba
- Founded: 1902
- Language: English
- Headquarters: 3137 Kuhio Highway; Līhuʻe, Hawaii 96766, United States
- Circulation: 4,141 Daily; 4,164 Sunday (as of 2022)
- ISSN: 0744-4028
- Website: thegardenisland.com

The Garden Island is a daily newspaper based in Līhuʻe, Hawaii, covering the islands of Kauaʻi and Niʻihau.

== History ==
The Garden Island began publication in 1902. It was founded by Japanese immigrant Sometaro Sheba and originally published two separate editions in Japanese and English. In 1903, a group of locals formed a corporation and bought the paper. Sheba continued to work as publisher and editor until 1904. At that time the Japanese edition spun off and became Kauai Shinpo. C.S. Dole resigned as editor and manager when E.B. Bridgewater, principal of Kilauea School, took over ownership in December 1910. Kenneth C. Hopper ran the paper for 22 years and in 1922 hired Charles J. Fern, a former barnstorming aviator, as editor.

Fern eventually became publisher and gained control of nearly all company stock in January 1966. He then sold it to Kauai Publishing Co., an affiliate of the Scripps League Newspapers. The sale price was around $400,000 and included KTOH. At that time the paper was twice-weekly and had a circulation of 5,800. Scripps was which was acquired by Pulitzer in 1996; Lee Enterprises acquired Pulitzer in 2005. Oahu Publications Inc., publisher of the Honolulu Star-Advertiser, acquired The Garden Island newspaper from Lee Enterprises in January 2013.

In 2024, the newspaper began posting videos to social media that featured AI-generated newscasters presenting news headlines. The videos received negative online comments from viewers and was called "digital colonialism" by a newsroom union representative. The videos were discontinued after two months.
