= Robertson Island, Tennessee =

Island in Davidson County, Tennessee, United States

Coordinates: 36°10′20″N 86°54′00″W

Robertson Island is an island on the Cumberland River in Davidson County, Tennessee, USA. It is near its crossing with the Richland Creek. It is the biggest island between Old Hickory Dam and Cheatham Dam. It is close to the Tennessee State Penitentiary.

== History ==
The island was first settled by James Robertson, after whom it was named. It later belonged to Leonard Cheatham, who named his plantation Westover. He later sold it to Mark R. Cockrill.

The plantation great house was demolished in 1936.
