= Estate Judith's Fancy =

- U.S. National Register of Historic Places
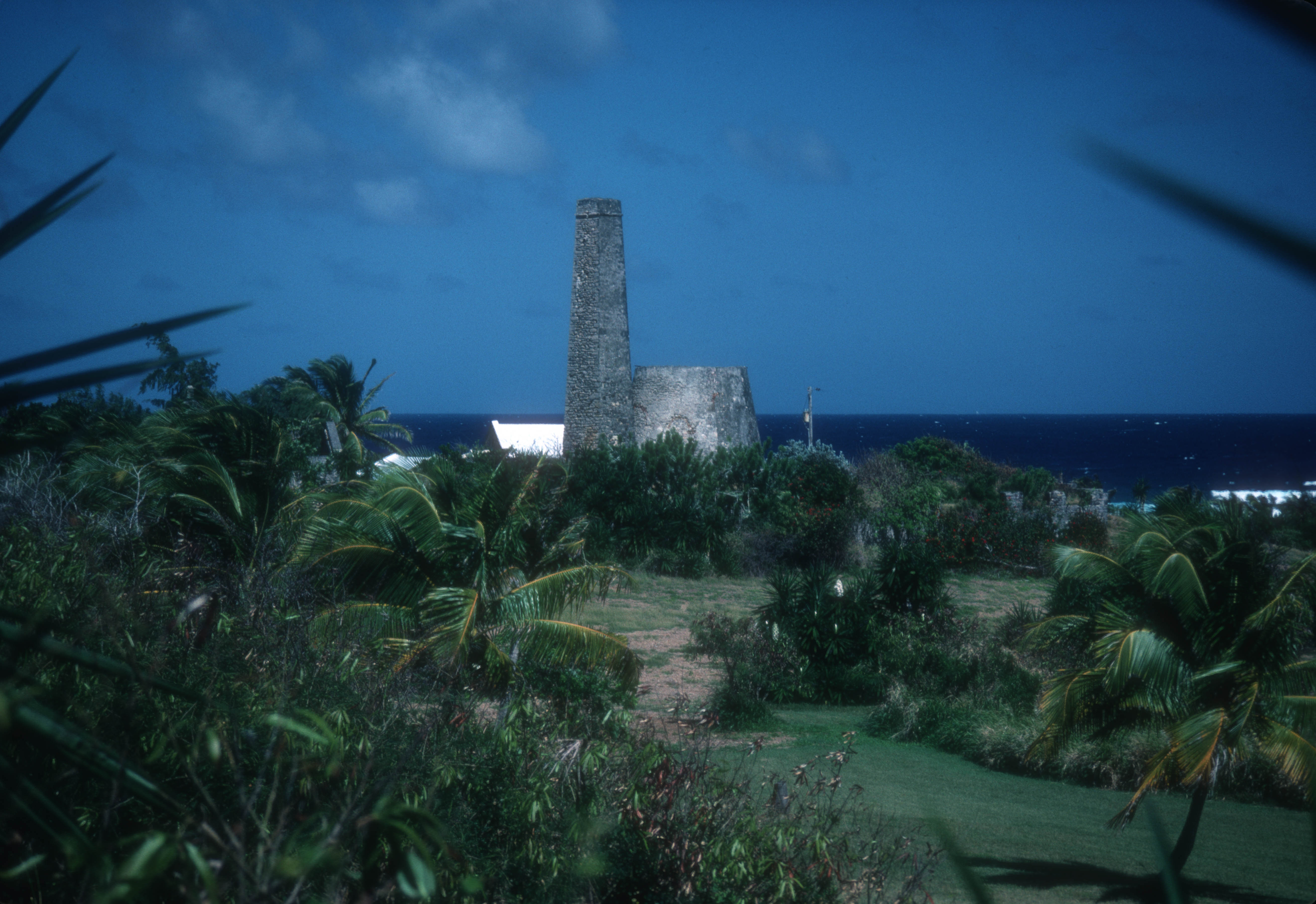

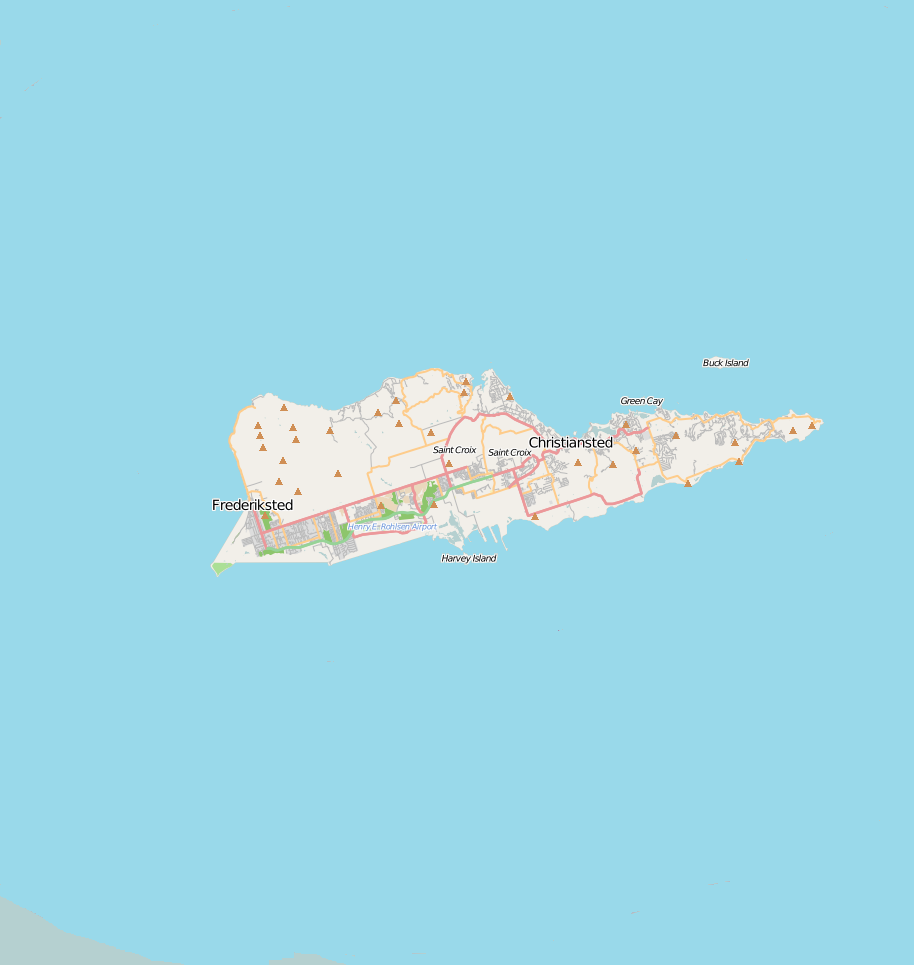
- Location within Saint Croix, US Virgin Islands Location within the U.S. Virgin Islands
- Location: 4 miles (6.4 km) northwest of Christiansted
- Coordinates: 17.778194°N 64.745694°W
- Area: 3.6 acres (1.5 ha)
- Built: 1733
- NRHP reference No.: 78002717
- Added to NRHP: July 17, 1978

Estate Judith's Fancy, subdistrict of Saint Croix, U.S. Virgin Islands, 4 miles (6.4 km) northwest of Christiansted is a former sugarcane plantation whose great house was built in 1733. Its surviving 3.6 acres (1.5 ha) property was listed on the National Register of Historic Places in 1978. The listing included six contributing sites.

== History ==
The site is significant for being the location of government headquarters during the French occupation of St. Croix during 1651–65, under the Knights of Malta's ownership, as well as for preserving remnants of typical buildings of a sugar plantation.

In 1766, the estate was known as Hemmers Plantation or Hemmersfryd. A later owner, Pieter Heyliger, who was a major landowner in the late 1800s, renamed the estate Judith’s Fancy after his daughter.

== Today ==
The property includes stonework ruins from a sugar factory, from a windmill which drew water, from a chimney of a later steam mill, and a small house. The factory building is T-shaped, with a two-story section being 22 by 96 feet (6.7 m × 29.3 m) in plan. An 18.5 by 36 feet (5.6 m × 11.0 m) wing was the boiling room. A one-story 10.67 by 15 feet (3.25 m × 4.57 m) cookhouse with a charcoal stove is also attached.
