= Estate Hogansborg =

- U.S. National Register of Historic Places
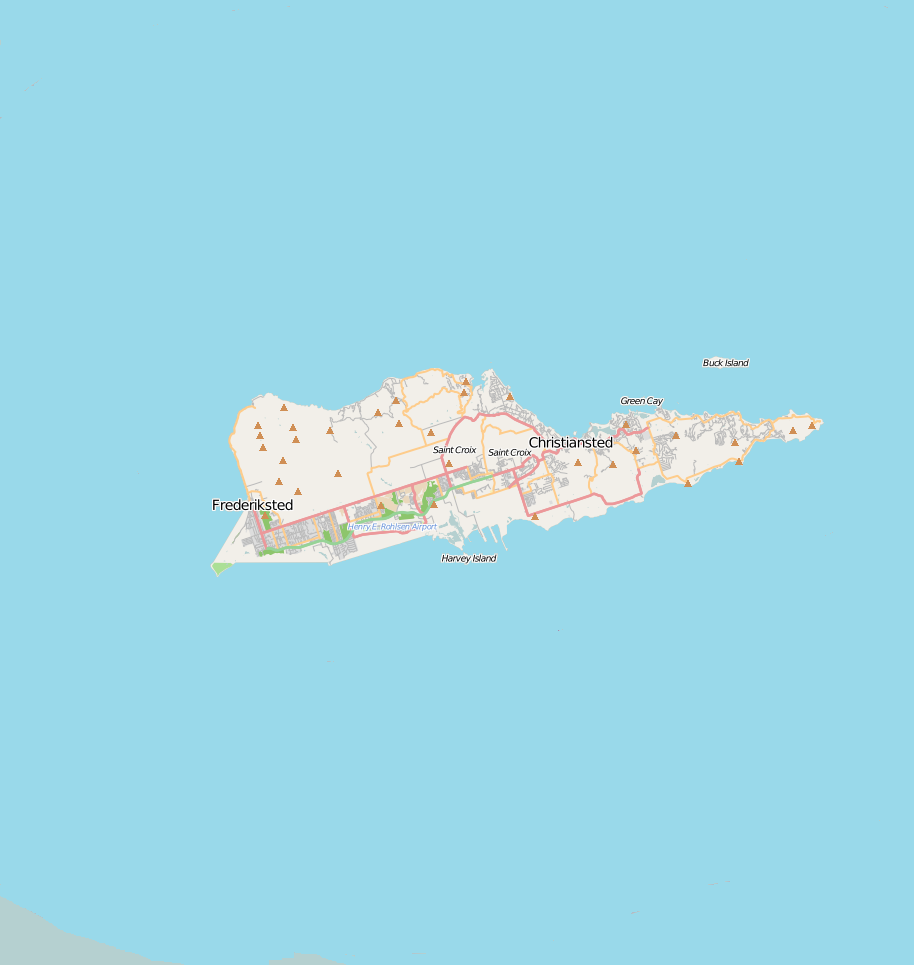
- Location within Saint Croix, US Virgin Islands Location within the U.S. Virgin Islands
- Location: Off Centerline Road 2.5 miles (4.0 km) east of Frederiksted, Saint Croix, Virgin Islands
- Coordinates: 17.710972°N 64.845556°W
- Area: 4.6 acres (1.9 ha)
- Built: 1757
- NRHP reference No.: 78002723
- Added to NRHP: February 17, 1978

Estate Hogansborg is located east of Frederiksted off Centerline Road in the Northwest district of Saint Croix, U.S. Virgin Islands, or the West End Quarter of Saint Croix. It dates back to 1757. It was listed on the U.S. National Register of Historic Places in 1978. The listing included four contributing buildings, two contributing structures, and three contributing sites on 4.6 acres (1.9 ha).

The estate includes a great house and two other houses, and remains of the island's first steam-powered sugar factory, of a later factory, of a slave village, and of other accessory buildings.
