= Lameshur Plantation =

- U.S. National Register of Historic Places
- U.S. Historic district
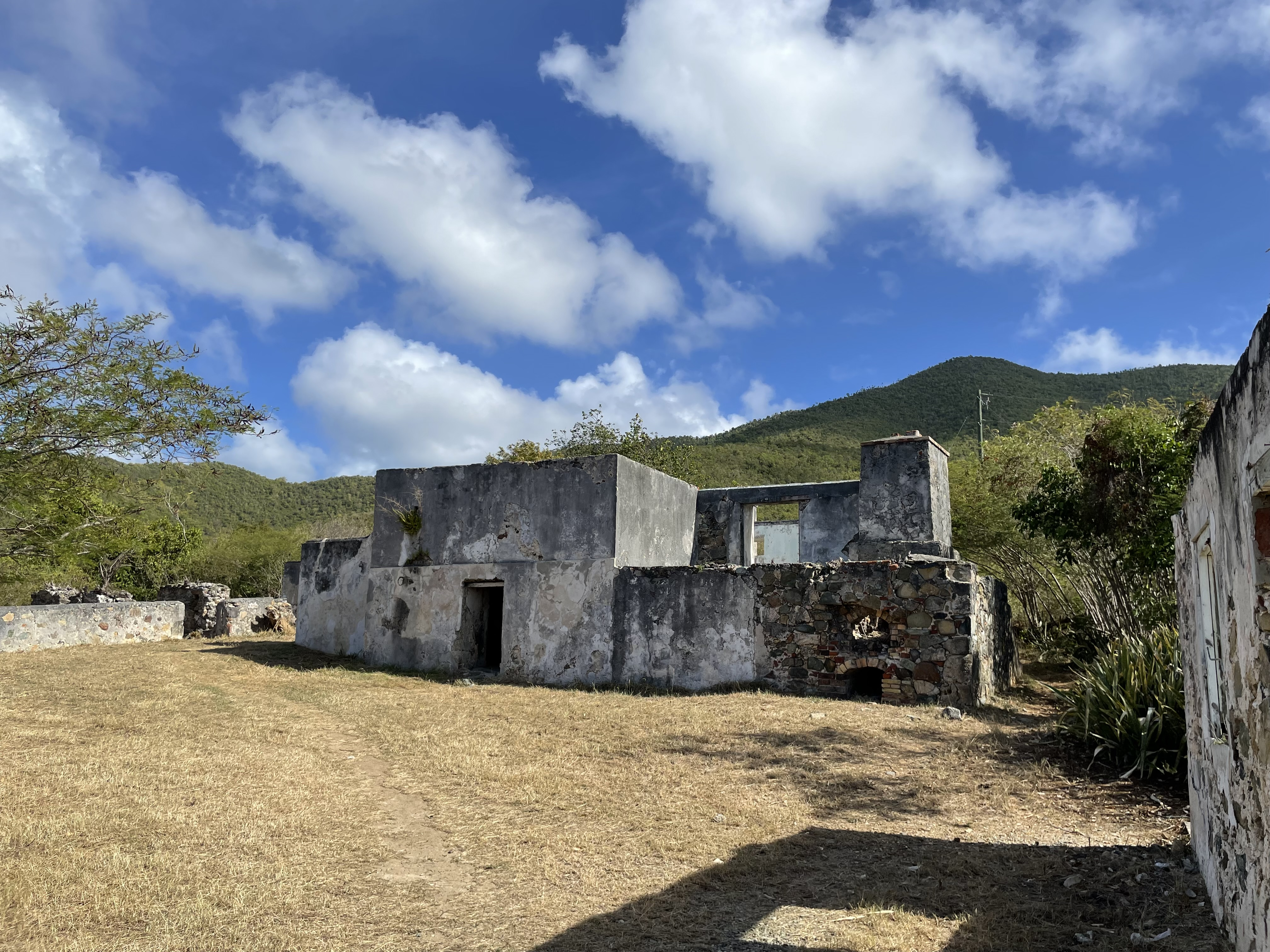

- Location within the U.S. Virgin Islands
- Nearest city: Cruz Bay, Virgin Islands
- Coordinates: 18°20′33″N 64°45′30″W
- Area: 25 acres (10 ha)
- Built: 1780
- MPS: Virgin Islands National Park MRA (AD)
- NRHP reference No.: 78000271
- Added to NRHP: June 23, 1978

Lameshur Plantation, near Cruz Bay on St. Thomas, United States Virgin Islands, was listed on the National Register of Historic Places in 1978. It is located east of Cruz Bay on Little Lameshur Bay. It is included in the central part of Virgin Islands National Park and dates to 1780. It includes a horsemill.
