= Pinewood (Nunnelly, Tennessee) =

Historic house in Tennessee, United States

- U.S. National Register of Historic Places
- Nearest city: Nunnelly, Tennessee
- Area: 9.9 acres (4.0 ha)
- Built: 1868
- NRHP reference No.: 71001072
- Added to NRHP: 1971

Pinewood Mansion, also known as the Pinewood Plantation, is a former plantation and historic site located in Nunnelly, Tennessee. The mansion was built from 1866 to 1868. The plantation house was restored in the late 1960s and 1970s by Lipscomb University Dean, Mack Wayne Craig, and it burned down in 1975.

It was once listed on the National Register of Historic Places in 1971.

== History ==
The house was built in 1868 for Samuel Graham and his wife, Thomasella (née Hardeman), on his 6,500-acre plantation. It later belonged to George Mayhew.

The house was vacant for 45 years, before it was purchased in 1968 by Mack Wayne Craig, who served as the academic Dean of David Lipscomb College, later known as Lipscomb University, from 1957 to 1978. Craig restored the home with the help of Margaret Carter, the Chair of the Department of Home Economics at Lipscomb University from 1946 to 1972. The house was listed on the National Register of Historic Places, and Craig offered tours and rented it for private events.

The house burned down on March 15, 1975, while Carter was in the house but Craig was away.
