= Pleasant Prospect =

Historic house in Maryland, United States

- U.S. National Register of Historic Places
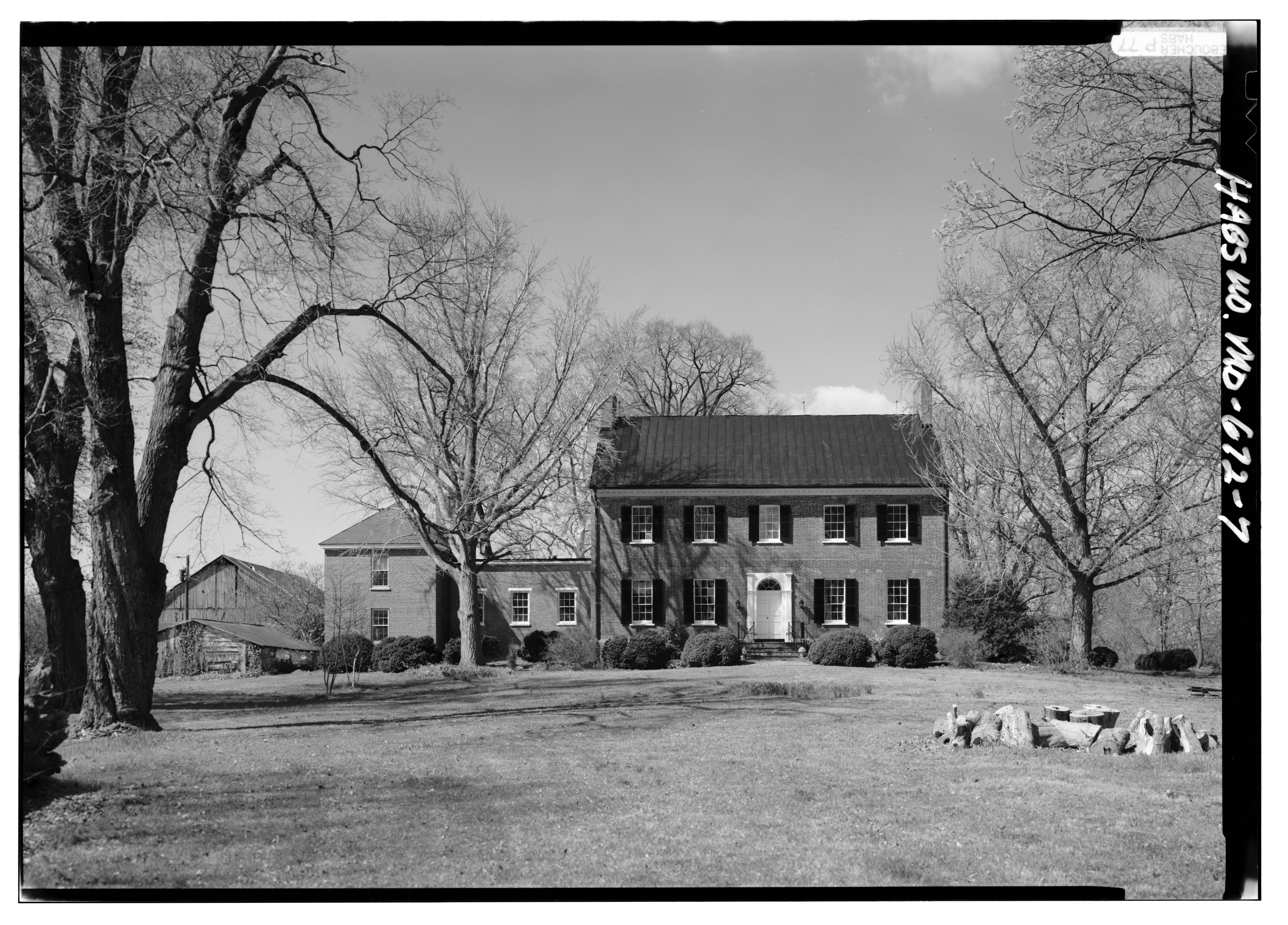
- General View of East (Front) Elevation, HABS Photo

- Location within Maryland Location within the United States
- Location: 12806 Woodmore Rd., Mitchellville, Maryland
- Coordinates: 38°56′4″N 76°47′0″W
- Area: 10 acres (4.0 ha)
- Built: 1798
- Built by: Duckett, Isaac
- Architectural style: Federal, Adamesque
- NRHP reference No.: 76002168
- Added to NRHP: April 30, 1976

Pleasant Prospect is a historic home located in Mitchellville, Prince George's County, Maryland. It is an outstanding and important example of a Federal style plantation house.

== Description ==
The house consists of a 2½-story main structure over a full basement with a 2-story kitchen linked by a 1-story hyphen. The kitchen wing and hyphen are typical of late 18th century ancillary architecture in southern Maryland. The walls are laid in Flemish bond, and the chimneys are typical of Maryland; wide on the side, thin and high above the ridge, rising on the gable ends of the house flush with the building wall. The interior exhibits outstanding Federal style trim, including elaborate Adamesque moldings and plasterwork ornamentation such as garlands, swags, and urns applied to interior doorways and mantles. A pyramidal roof, log meat house stands on the immediate grounds.

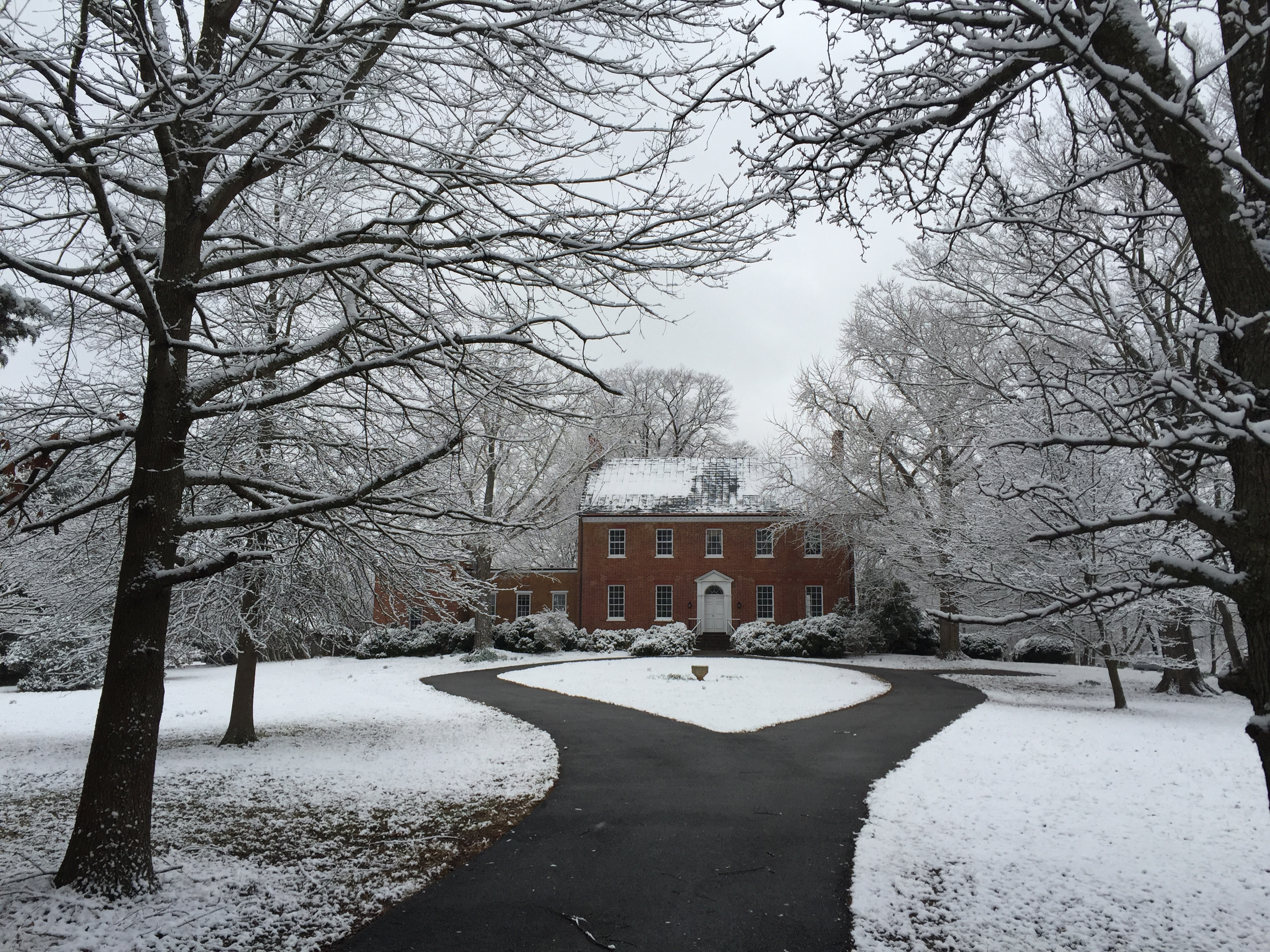
Pleasant Prospect, Winter 2016

The architectural design and unique features of the house were documented in the permanent collection of the Historic American Buildings Survey at the Library of Congress in 1936 and again in 1983. This documentation notes: "Pleasant Prospect reflects the wealth and elegance of the upper class of planters in Prince George's County during the late 18th and early 19th century. The house was unusually large and well appointed for its time, with a large hall or passage, formal parlor, separate dining room and a library in the main block of the first floor."

== History ==
Pleasant Prospect was built c. 1798 for Dr. Isaac Duckett, described as one of the most opulent slave owners in the state. It is one of four houses built in Prince George's County during this period that were valued at $1,500 (~$36,057 in 2024) or more in the 1798 Federal Direct Tax assessment and is described in that document as "a new Two story Brick dwelling, very elegantly furnished with passage 20 by 16, kitchen 19 by 14, all of Brick." Pleasant Prospect is one of three plantations built by the Duckett family in Prince George's County. The other two are Fairview, built by Isaac Duckett's brother Baruch around 1800, and Melford in the 1840s.

Pleasant Prospect was listed on the National Register of Historic Places in 1976.

== Gallery ==
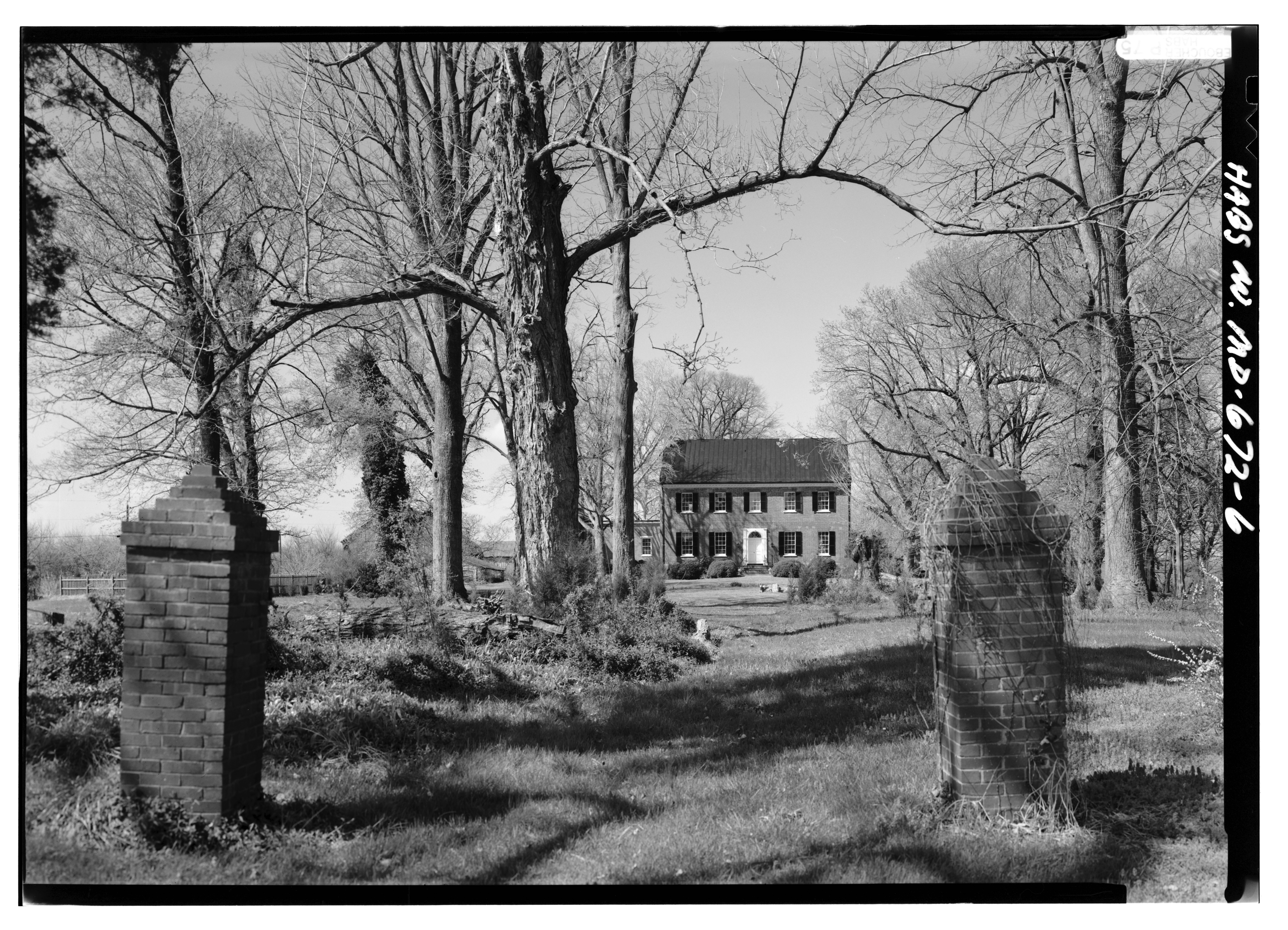
General view of east (front) showing historic approach to the house

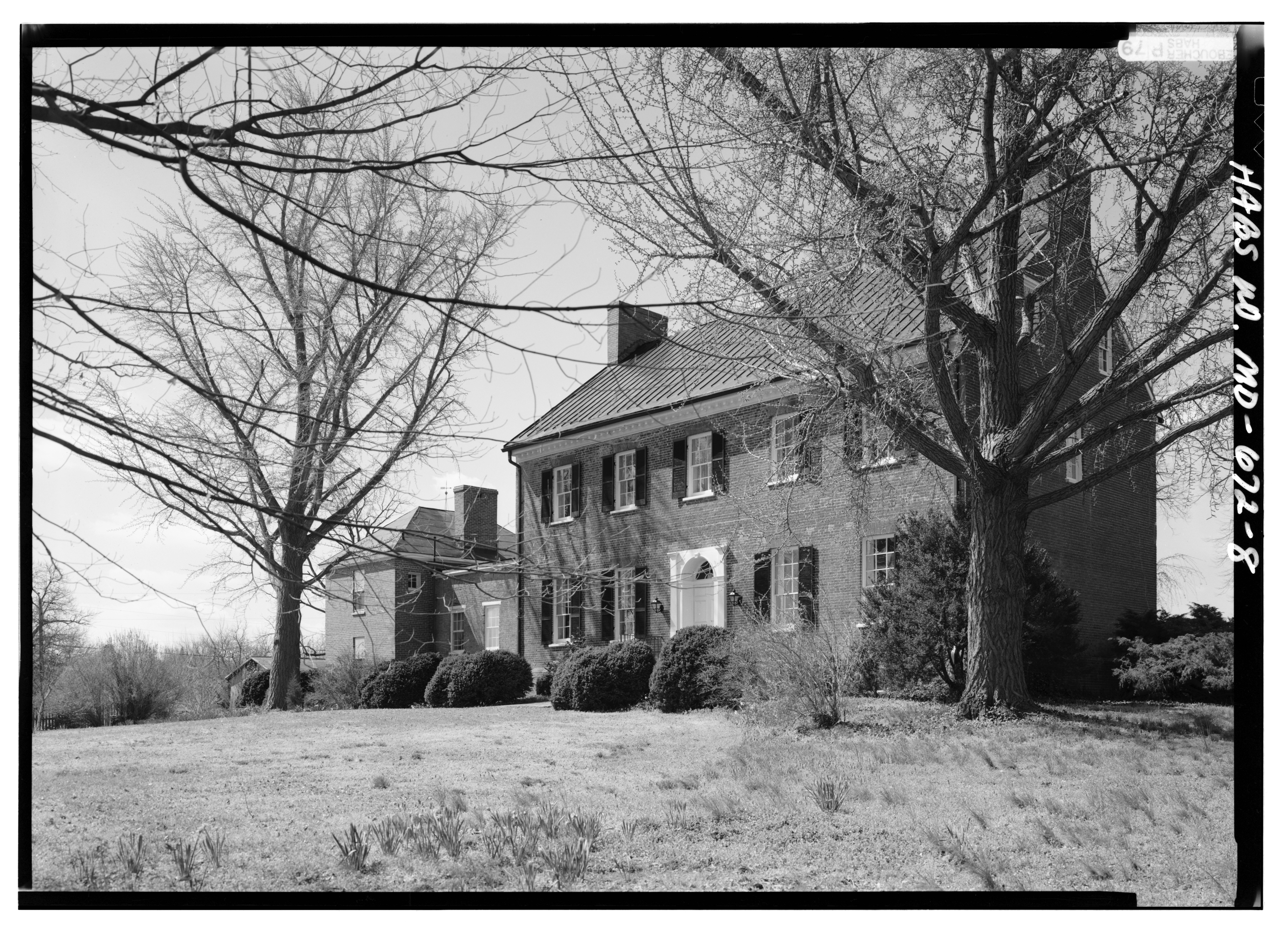
Perspective view of east looking southwest

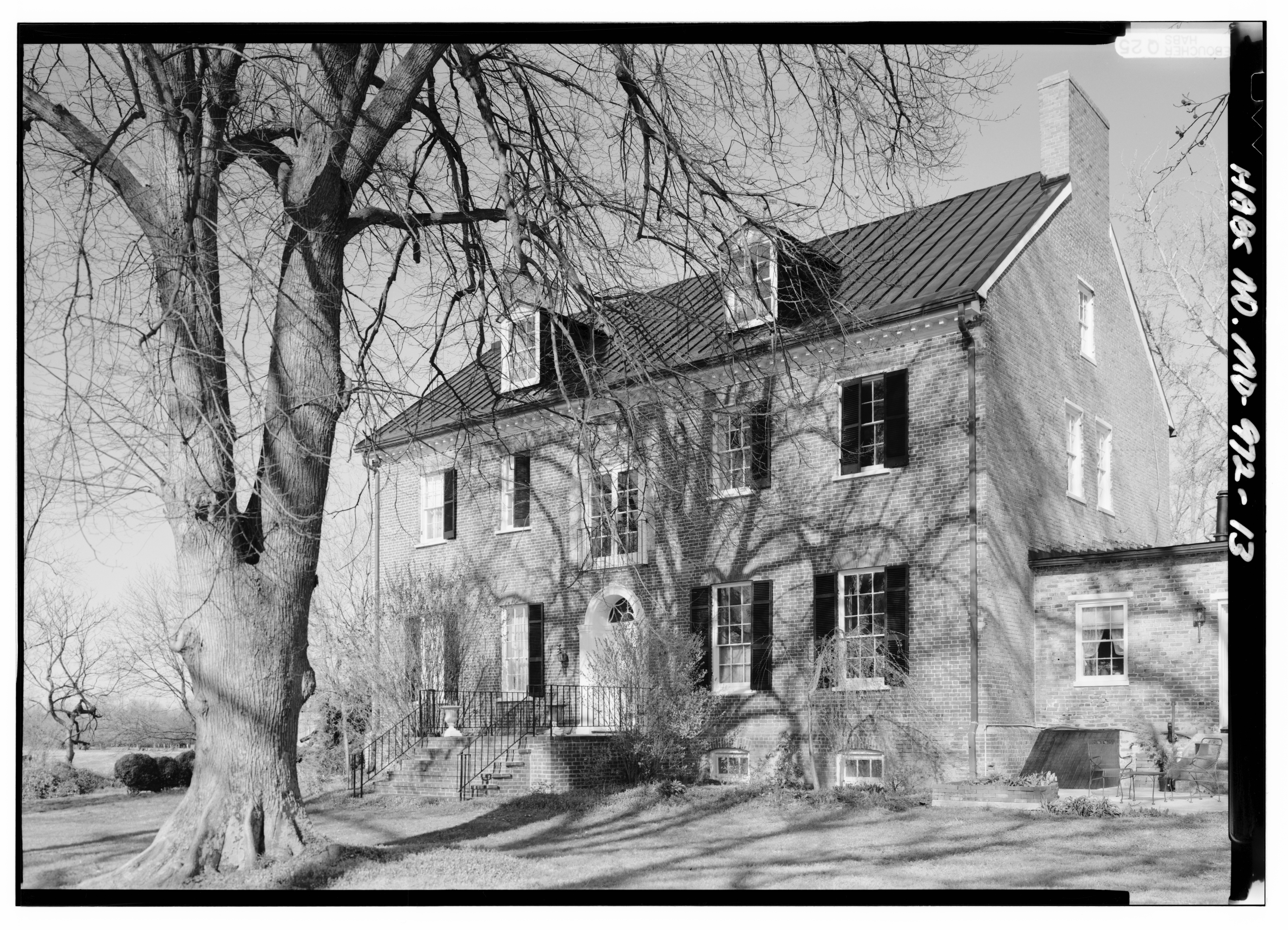
Perspective view of the west (rear) of the main block, looking northeast

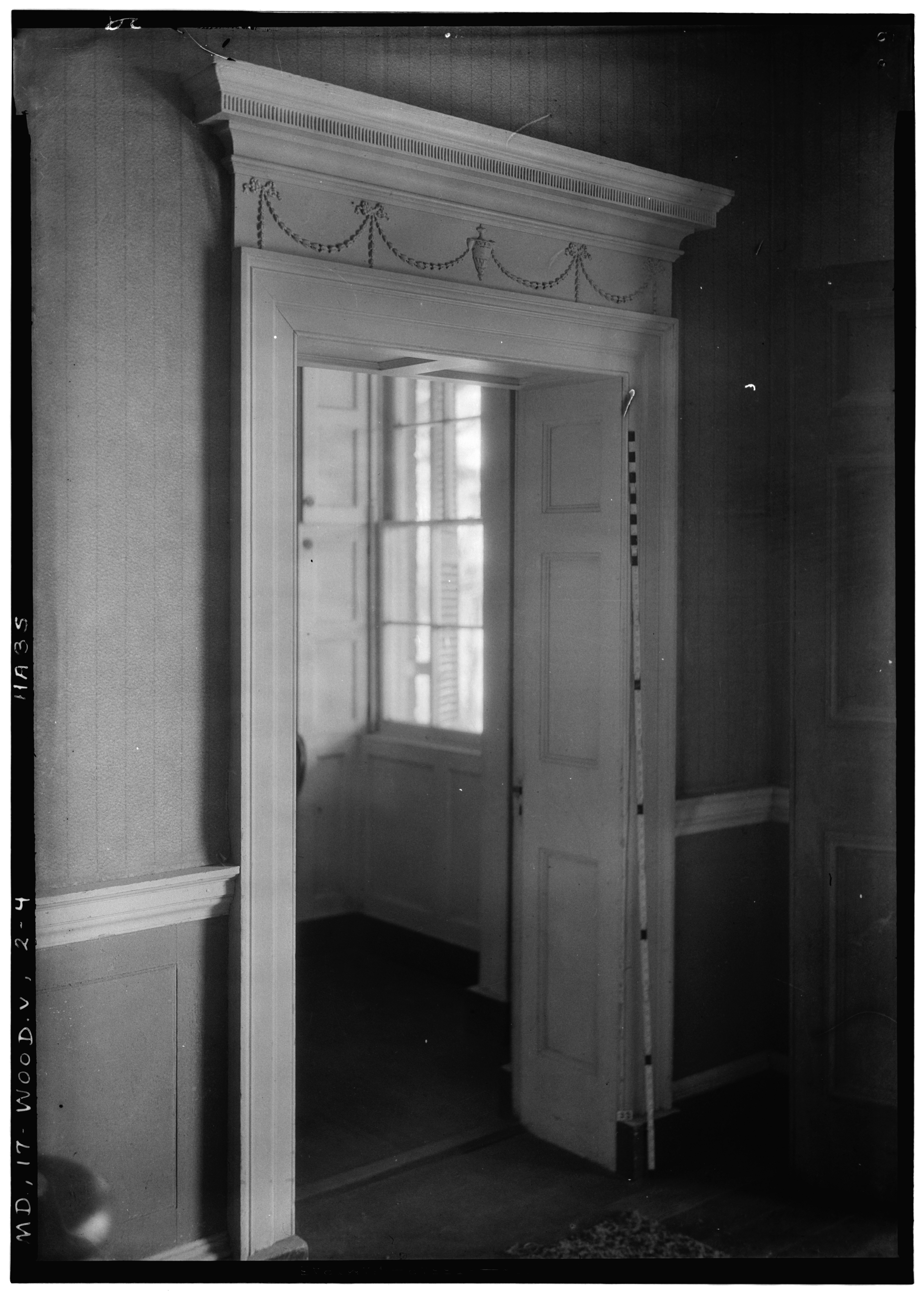
Federal style door detail

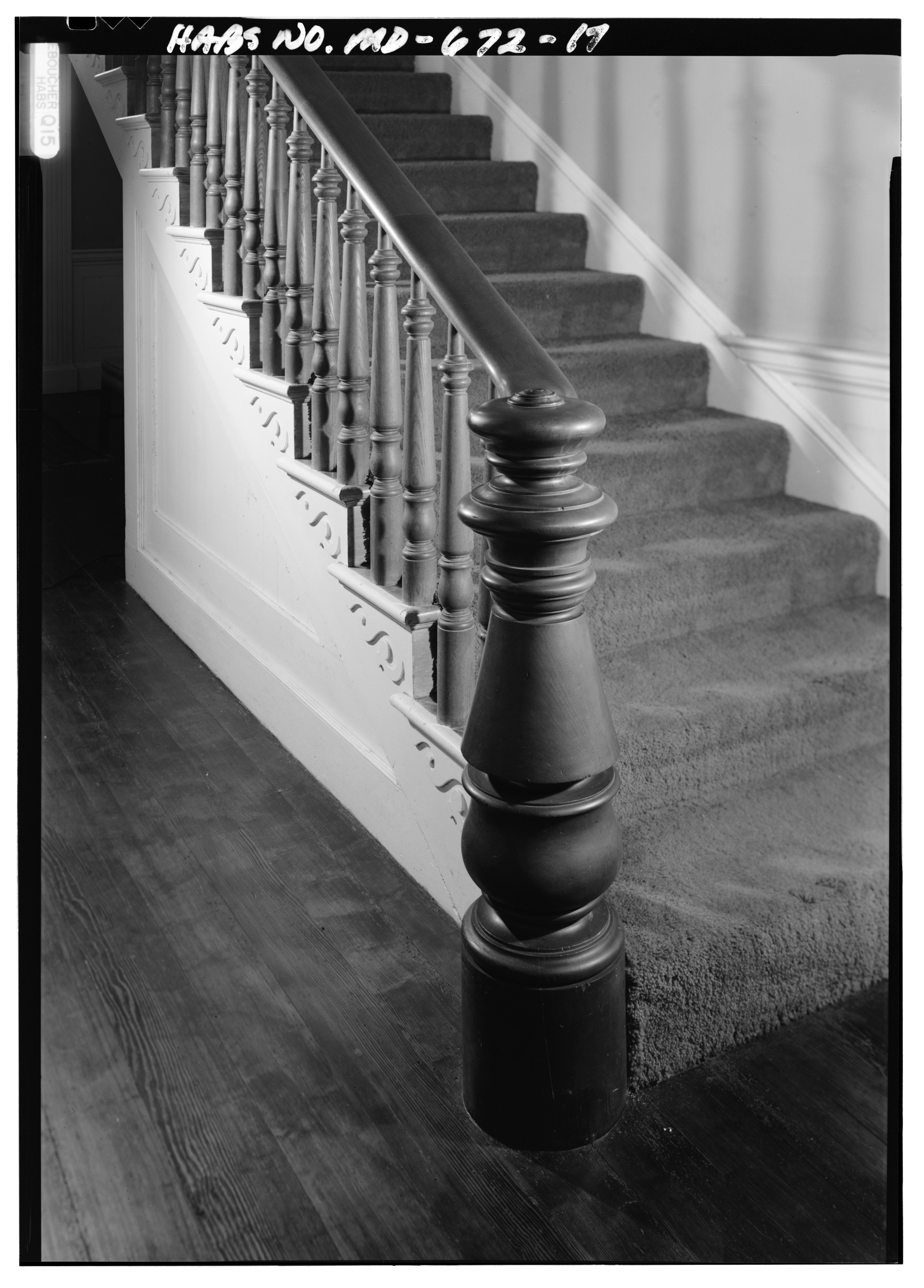
Detail of newel post and balustrade of stairway
