= Oak Hill Farm =

Historic house in Tennessee, United States

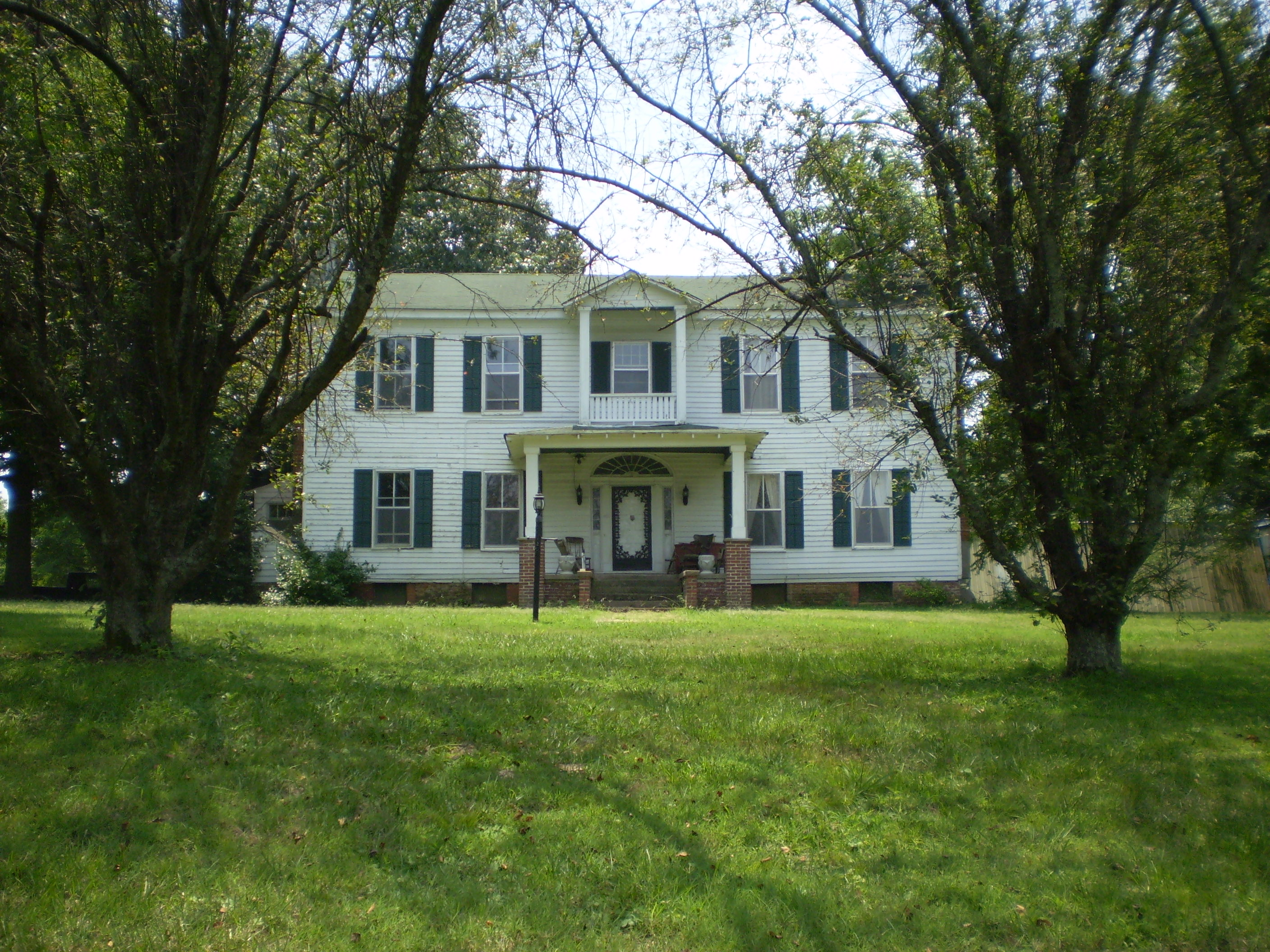
- Front view of the Taylor House at Oak Hill Farm

- Location within Tennessee Location within the United States
- 35.453679°N 89.474373°W
- Location: Stanton, Tennessee, USA

History
- Built: 1834

Site notes
- Area: 213 acres (86 ha)
- Architectural style: Federal style

U.S. National Register of Historic Places
- Criteria: A, C
- Designated: 27 March 2013
- Reference no.: 13000125

Oak Hill Farm is a historic farm and former slave plantation in Tipton and Haywood Counties in Tennessee. Established in 1834, it was listed on the National Register of Historic Places in March 2013. Oak Hill Farm is also listed as a Tennessee Century Farm for continuous agricultural production since the 1830s.
