= Coakley Bay Estate =

- U.S. National Register of Historic Places
- U.S. Historic district
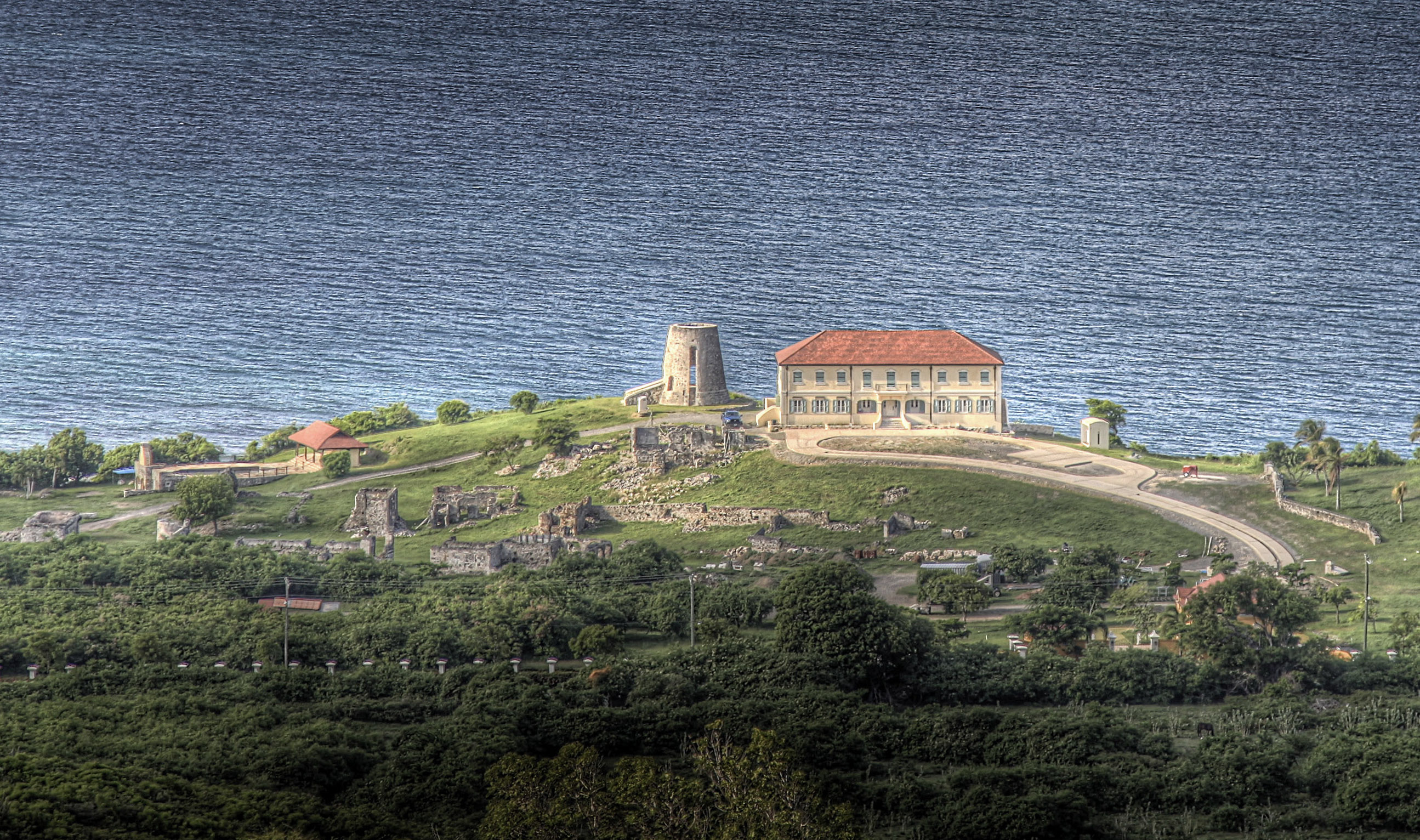
- Photo from 2009

- Location within the U.S. Virgin Islands
- Location: East of Christiansted, Saint Croix, U.S. Virgin Islands
- Coordinates: 17.758559°N 64.641011°W
- Area: 55 acres (22 ha)
- Built: 1810, other
- NRHP reference No.: 76001841
- Added to NRHP: July 23, 1976

Coakley Bay Estate is a 55 acres (22 ha) property in the East End area, east of Christiansted, Saint Croix, U.S. Virgin Islands. It was listed on the National Register of Historic Places in 1976. The listing included seven contributing sites.

The property includes surviving stonework of a mill for grinding sugarcane and of a 20 feet (6.1 m)-tall windmill for drawing water. A capstone on the latter is marked "1810". It includes a one-story 70 by 36 feet (21 m × 11 m) great house with foundation and main floor built of "red ballast and yellow brick". Wood frame interior work appears to date from about 1920.
