= Estate Saint George Historic District =

- U.S. National Register of Historic Places
- U.S. Historic district
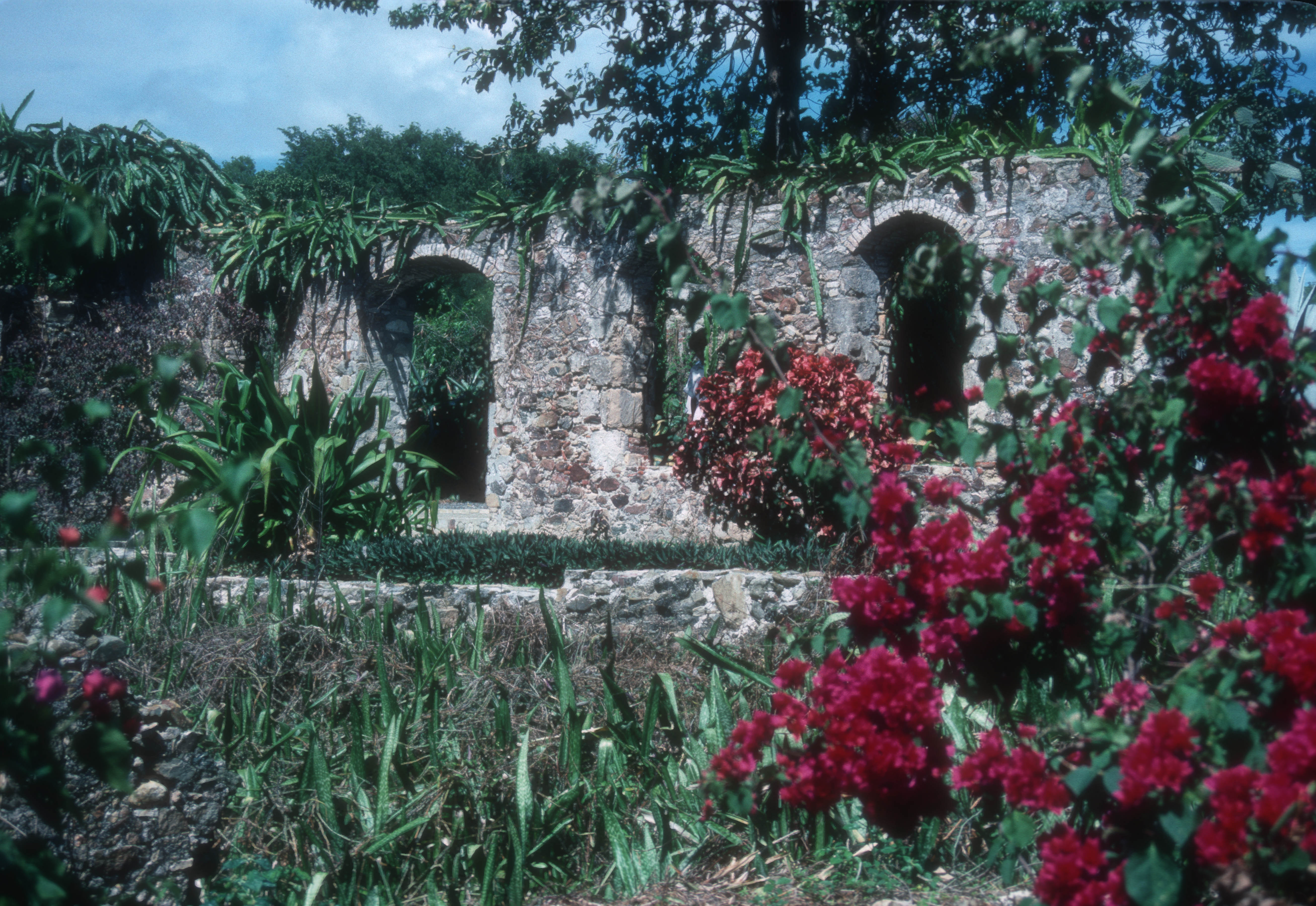

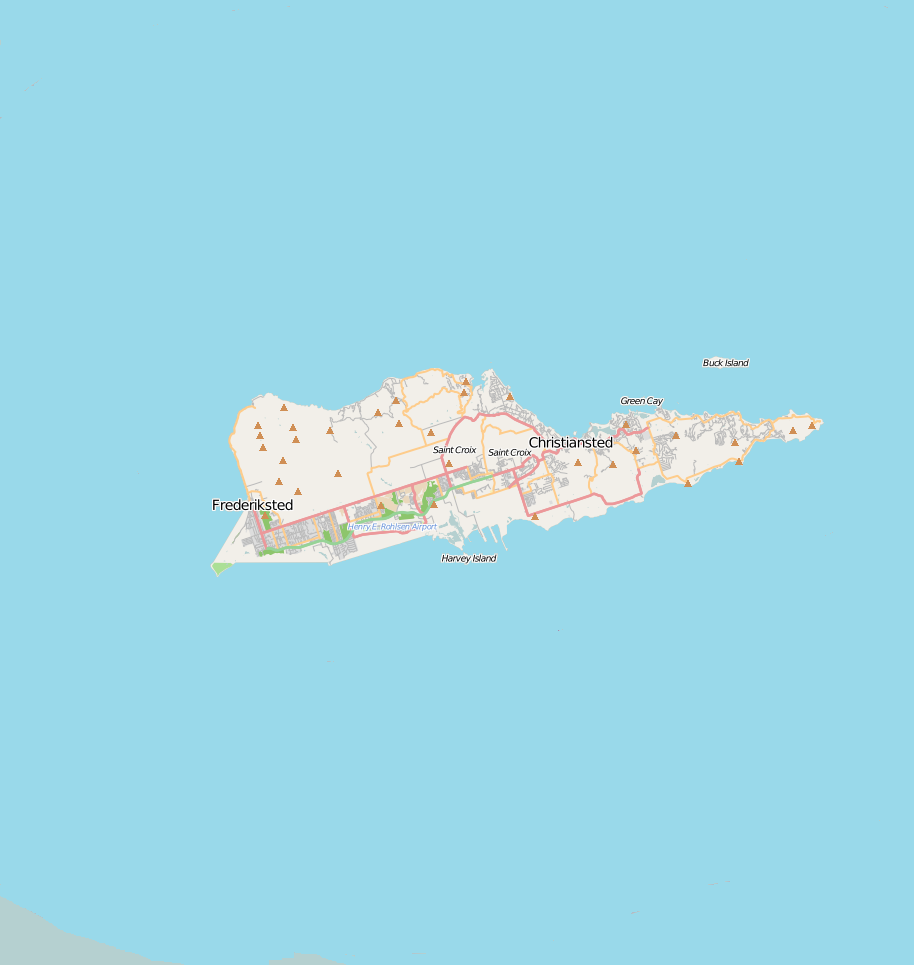
- Location within Saint Croix, US Virgin Islands Location within the U.S. Virgin Islands
- Location: Prince Quarter, Northwest, Frederiksted, Virgin Islands
- Coordinates: 17.717917°N 64.830139°W
- Area: 16 acres (6.5 ha)
- Built: 1816
- NRHP reference No.: 86003351
- Added to NRHP: October 24, 1986

Estate Saint George Historic District is a historic district in the Northwest subdistrict near Fredericksted in Saint Croix, U.S. Virgin Islands which was listed on the National Register of Historic Places in 1986. The listing included eight contributing buildings, nine contributing sites, and seven contributing structures to the original sugar plantation.

The property was then owned and operated by the St. George Village Botanical Garden of St. Croix, Inc.
