= Kīlauea Elementary School =

- Kīlauea Elementary School (as Kīlauea School)
- U.S. National Register of Historic Places
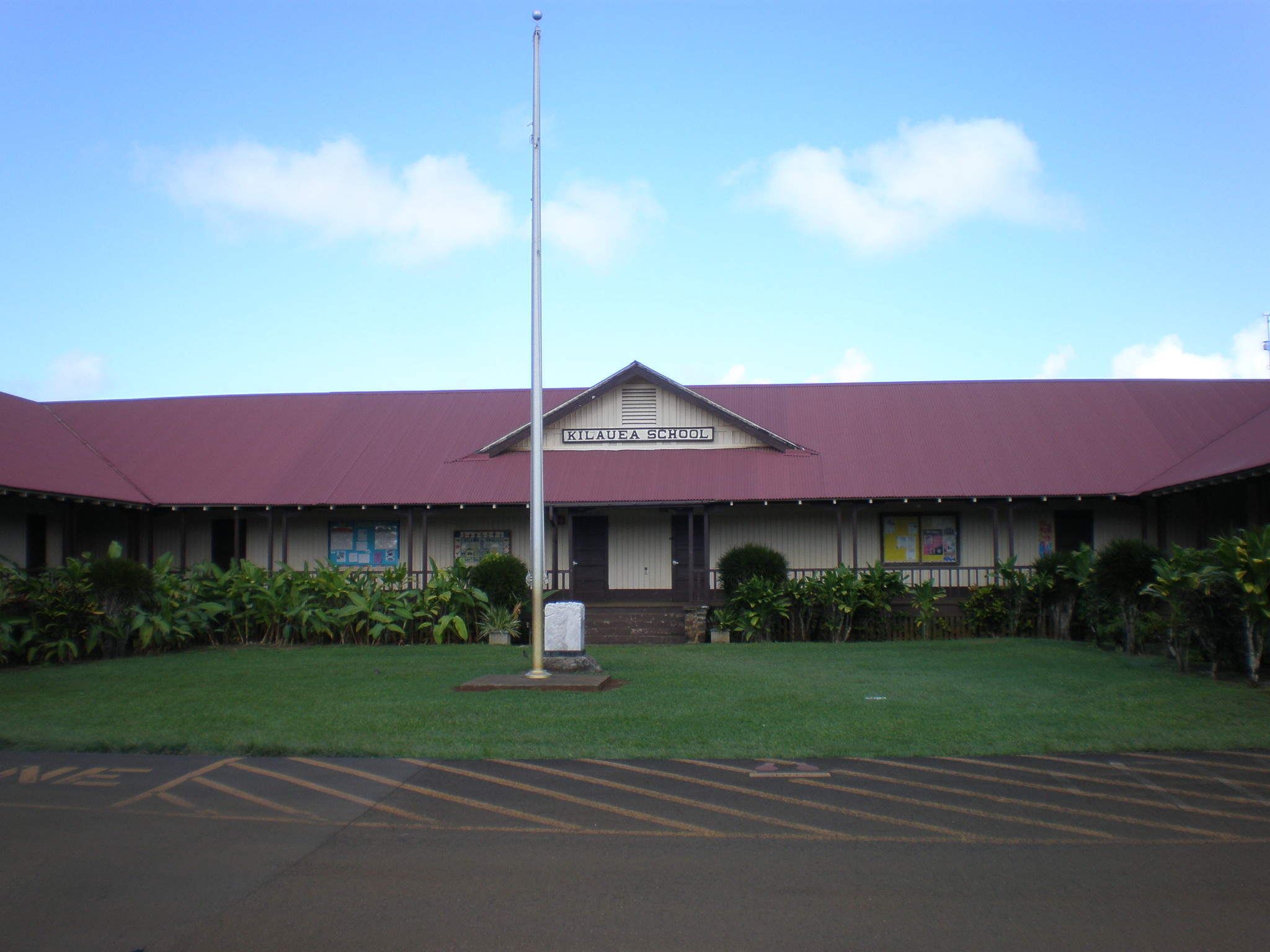

- Location within Hawaii
- Location: 2440 Kolo Rd., Kīlauea, Hawaii
- Coordinates: 22°12′22″N 159°24′34″W
- Area: 6.5 acres (2.6 ha)
- Built: 1922
- Architect: John Waiamau, Tai King Leong
- NRHP reference No.: 83000254
- Added to NRHP: August 18, 1983

Kīlauea Elementary School, also known as Kīlauea School, on Kolo Rd. in Kīlauea, Hawaii, on Kauaʻi, is a public elementary school operated by the Hawaiʻi Department of Education. It occupies a historic school building that was founded in 1882 and known as an "English School". The current school complex, whose main building was built in 1922, was listed on the National Register of Historic Places in 1983; the listing included three contributing buildings on 6.5 acres (2.6 ha).

It was located on the edge of the former Kīlauea Plantation community. The three buildings are a U-shaped administration-classrooms building, a cafeteria, and a teacher's cottage. A big lawn in front of the three buildings is crossed by a circular driveway. The main building was designed by County Department of Public Works' architect John Waiamau, and the others were designed by Tai King Leong.

The complex was deemed significant for NRHP listing "as a typical rural schoolhouse on the island of Kauaʻi and for its associations with the development of public education in the town of Kīlauea."
