= Hall-Harding-McCampbell House =

Historic house in Tennessee, United States

- U.S. National Register of Historic Places
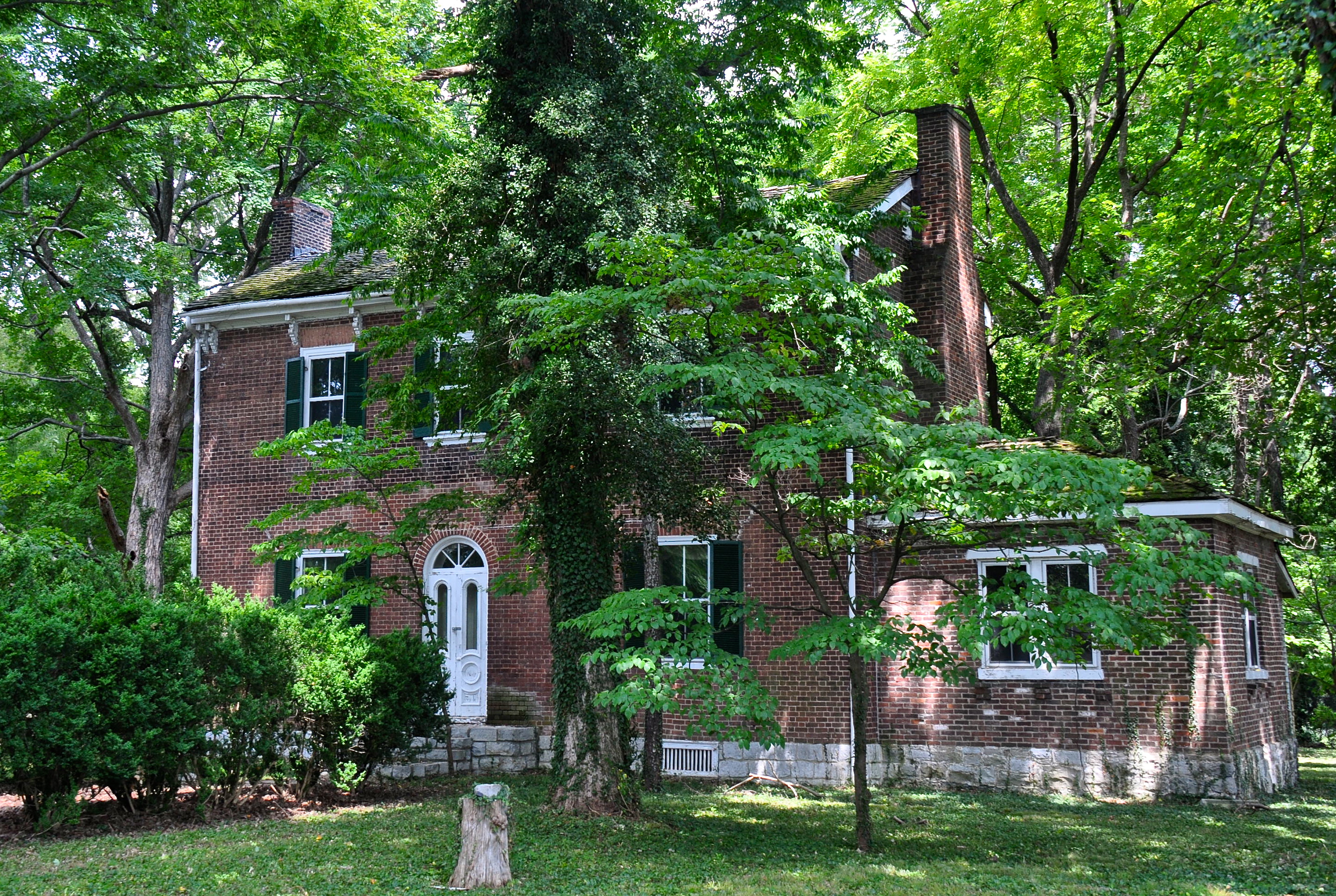
- The Hall-Harding-McCampbell House in 2014

- Location within Tennessee
- Location: 305 Kent Road, Nashville, Tennessee
- Coordinates: 36°9′32″N 86°39′43.2″W
- Area: less than one acre
- Built: 1804
- Architectural style: Early Republic
- NRHP reference No.: 10000141
- Added to NRHP: March 23, 2010

The Hall-Harding-McCampbell House is a former plantation and historic mansion in Nashville, Tennessee. It has been listed on the National Register of Historic Places since March 23, 2010.

== History ==
The land, located near Stones River, was claimed by William Moore in 1784. In 1799, he sold it to Charles Merryman Hall. His brother, William Hall, purchased 249 acres of the land from Charles in 1800.

The house was built circa 1805 for William Hall, and it was designed in the Federal architectural style. Hall, his wife, his son and his daughter lived here with his forty slaves until 1820. It was purchased by Thomas Harding, who acquired up to 1,000 acres by 1847. James Anderson purchased the plantation in 1847, and he sold 200 acres and the house to Thomas McCampbell in 1852. McCampbell lived here with his wife, Anna Gowdey Campbell, and their five children. Their son John Campbell inherited the house in 1875, and the house stayed in the family until the 1940s.
