= Harwood, Arkansas =

- Unincorporated community
- Location within Arkansas Location within the United States
- Coordinates: 33°09′46″N 91°07′41″W
- Country: United States
- State: Arkansas
- County: Chicot
- Elevation: 118 ft (36 m)
- Time zone: UTC-6 (Central (CST))
  - Summer (DST): UTC-5 (CDT)
- Area code: 870
- GNIS feature ID: 57051

Harwood is an unincorporated community in Chicot County, Arkansas, United States.

In 1915, it was the site of the 5,000-acre Florence Plantation.
