= Kīlauea Plantation =

Former sugarcane plantation on Kauai Island, Hawaii

The Kīlauea Plantation or Kīlauea Sugar Plantation was a large sugarcane plantation on the north side of Kauaʻi island, Hawaii, including the community of Kīlauea, Hawaii. It was owned and operated by the 1880-incorporated Kīlauea Sugar Company, which became the Kīlauea Sugar Plantation, Co. from 1899 on. The original property was bought by an American, Charles Titcomb, from Kamehameha IV by 1863 who used it for cattle ranching. It was sold to Englishmen John Ross and E.P. Adams, who also leased additional land from Titcomb. Ross and Adams planted sugarcane, then incorporated a firm. It was operated as a plantation from 1880 to 1971.

== Historic buildings ==
Several historic buildings of the plantation survive, and are listed on the U.S. National Register of Historic Places (NRHP). Among these are several stone buildings, of a local style that took advantage of fieldstone removed from sugarcane fields. Temporary railway tracks were laid down to transport the fieldstone from piles beside the fields to the building locations.

=== Kīlauea Plantation Manager's House ===
- Kīlauea Plantation Manager's House
- U.S. National Register of Historic Places
- Location: 4591 Kauwa Rd., Kīlauea, Hawaii
- Coordinates: 22°12′20″N 159°24′44″W
- Area: 13 acres (5.3 ha)
- Built: 1926
- Built by: Larsen, L. David
- Architectural style: Bungalow/craftsman
- MPS: Kilauea Plantation Stone Buildings MPS
- NRHP reference No.: 93000777
- Added to NRHP: August 5, 1993

The Kīlauea Plantation Manager's House, at 4591 Kuawa Rd. in Kīlauea, was NRHP-listed in 1993; the listing includes three contributing buildings.

=== Kīlauea Plantation Head Luna's House ===
- Kīlauea Plantation Head Luna's House
- U.S. National Register of Historic Places
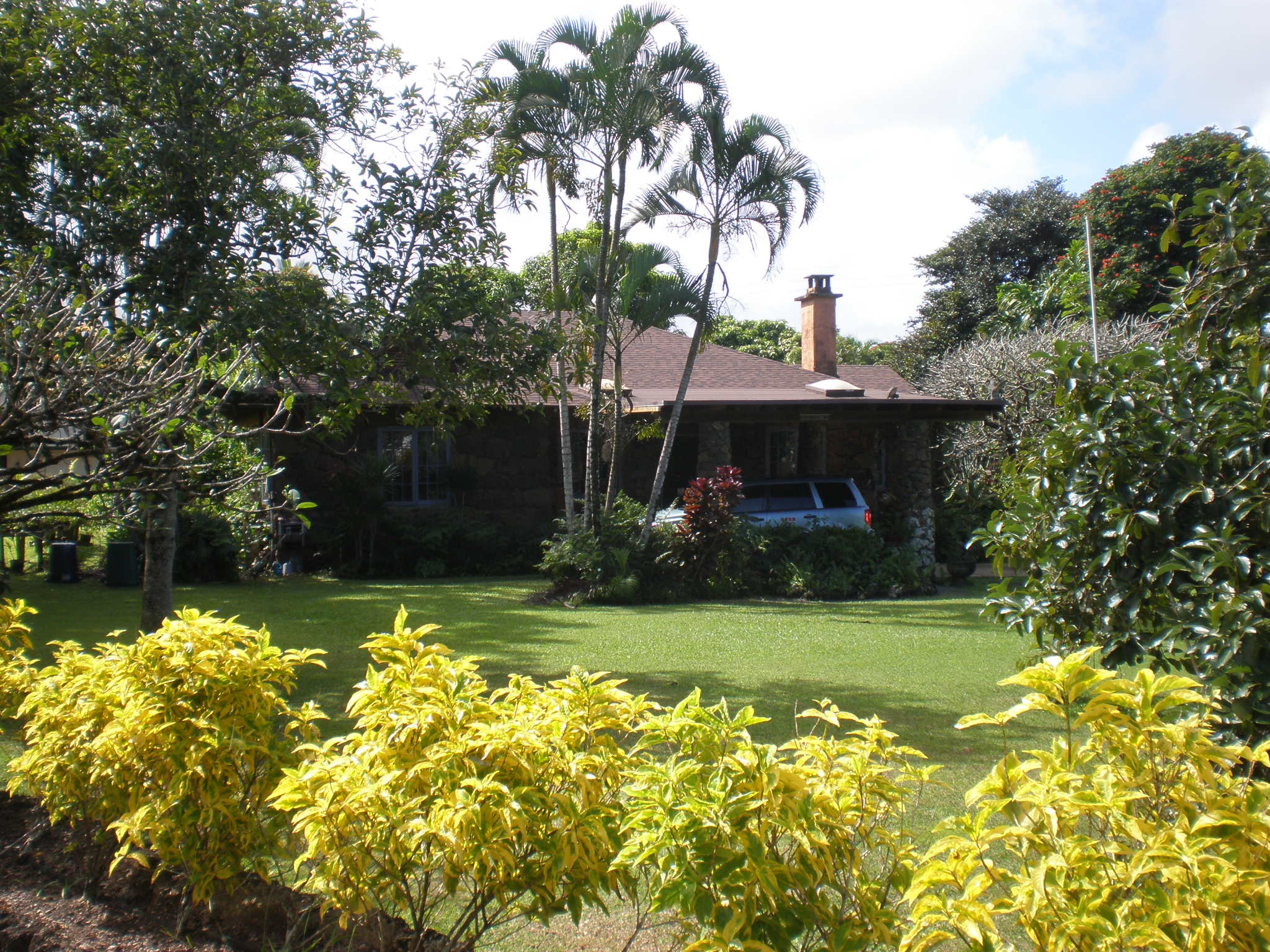
- Location: 2457 Kolo Rd., Kīlauea, Hawaii
- Coordinates: 22°12′30″N 159°24′46″W
- Area: less than one acre
- Built: 1931
- Built by: Allen, Ray M.
- Architectural style: Bungalow/craftsman
- MPS: Kilauea Plantation Stone Buildings MPS
- NRHP reference No.: 93000775
- Added to NRHP: August 5, 1993

Also known at the William Akana Residence, the Kīlauea Plantation Head Luna's House, at 2457 Kolo Rd. in Kīlauea, also was NRHP-listed in 1993.

=== Kīlauea Plantation Head Bookkeeper's House ===
- Kīlauea Plantation Head Bookkeeper's House
- U.S. National Register of Historic Places
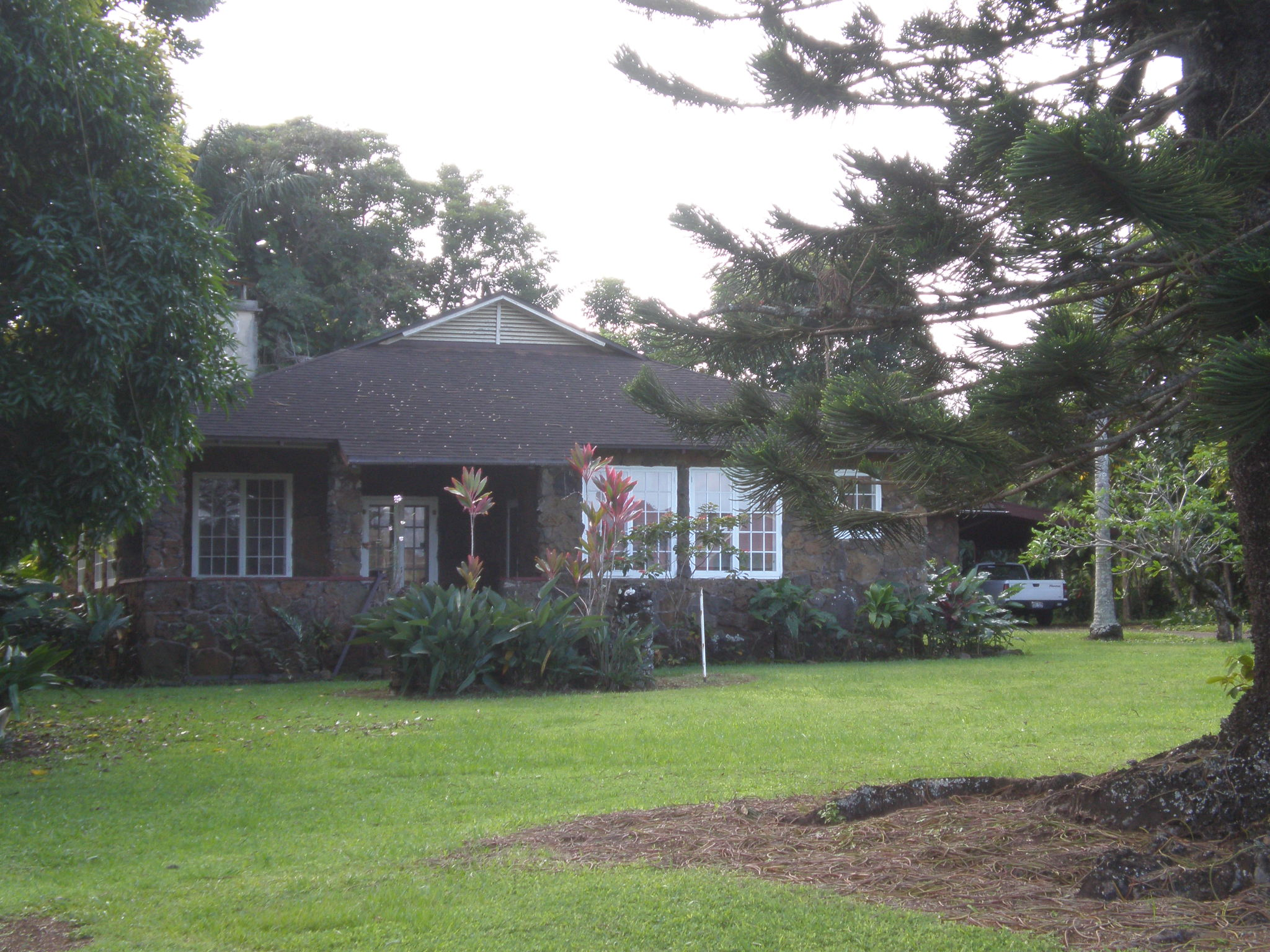
- Location: 2421 Kolo Rd., Kīlauea, Hawaii
- Coordinates: 22°12′30″N 159°24′46″W
- Area: less than one acre
- Built: 1930
- Built by: Allen, Ray M.
- Architectural style: Bungalow/craftsman
- MPS: Kilauea Plantation Stone Buildings MPS
- NRHP reference No.: 93000774
- Added to NRHP: August 5, 1993

The Kīlauea Plantation Head Bookkeeper's House, at 2421 Kolo Rd. in Kīlauea, Hawaii, was built in 1930. Its NRHP listing, also in 1993, included two contributing buildings. The main house was the seventh stone house built by the plantation, and is "a good example of the bungalow/craftsman style in Hawaii".

=== Kīlauea School ===
22°12′39″N 159°24′44″W

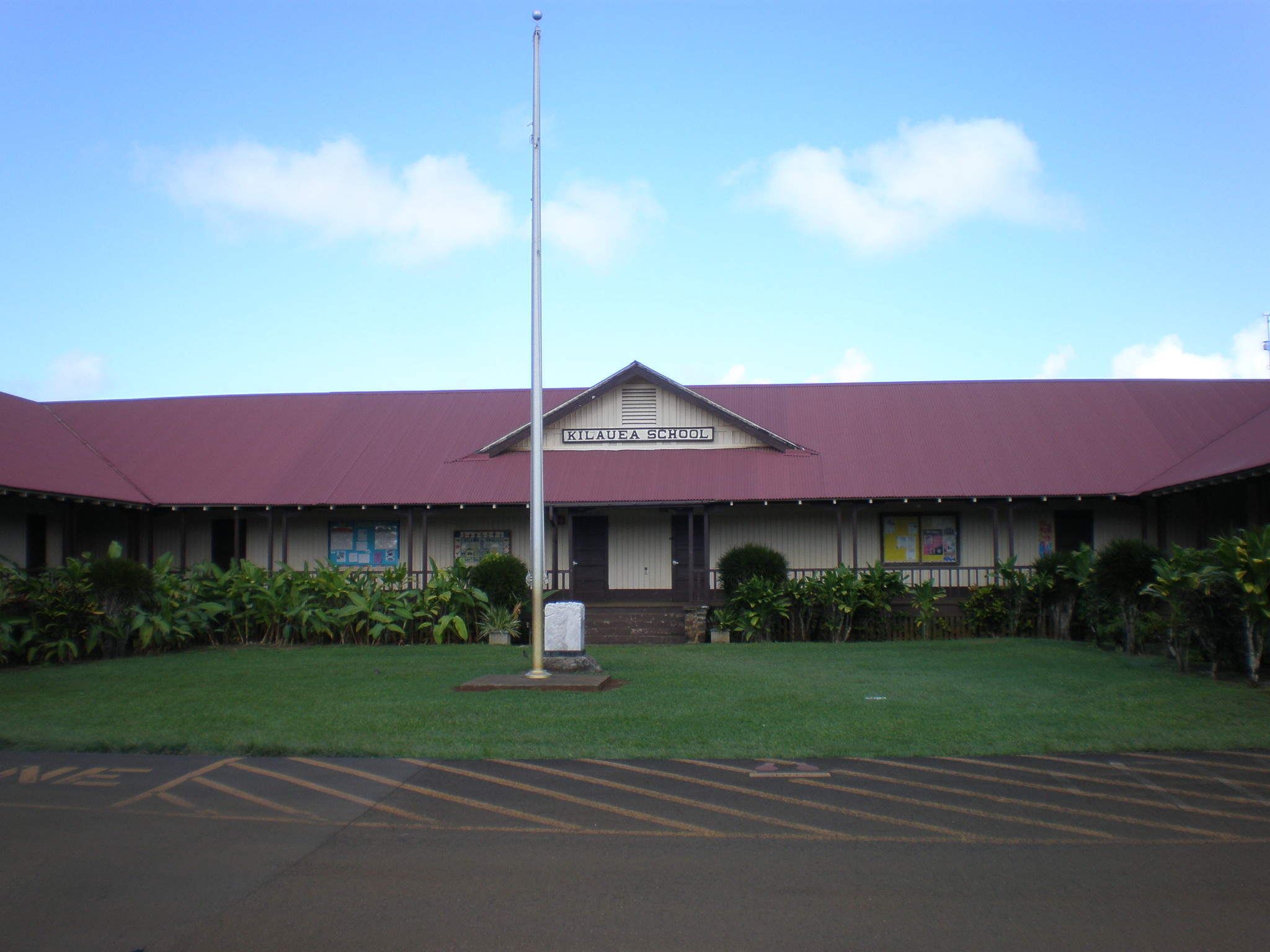
Kīlauea School

The school for the community was the Kīlauea School, located on the edge of the plantation, at 2440 Kolo Rd., Kīlauea, Hawaii. It was built in 1922 and is NRHP-listed, but is not built of stone. It was listed for its architecture and its association with the community.

=== Kong Lung Store ===
22°12′55″N 159°24′35″W

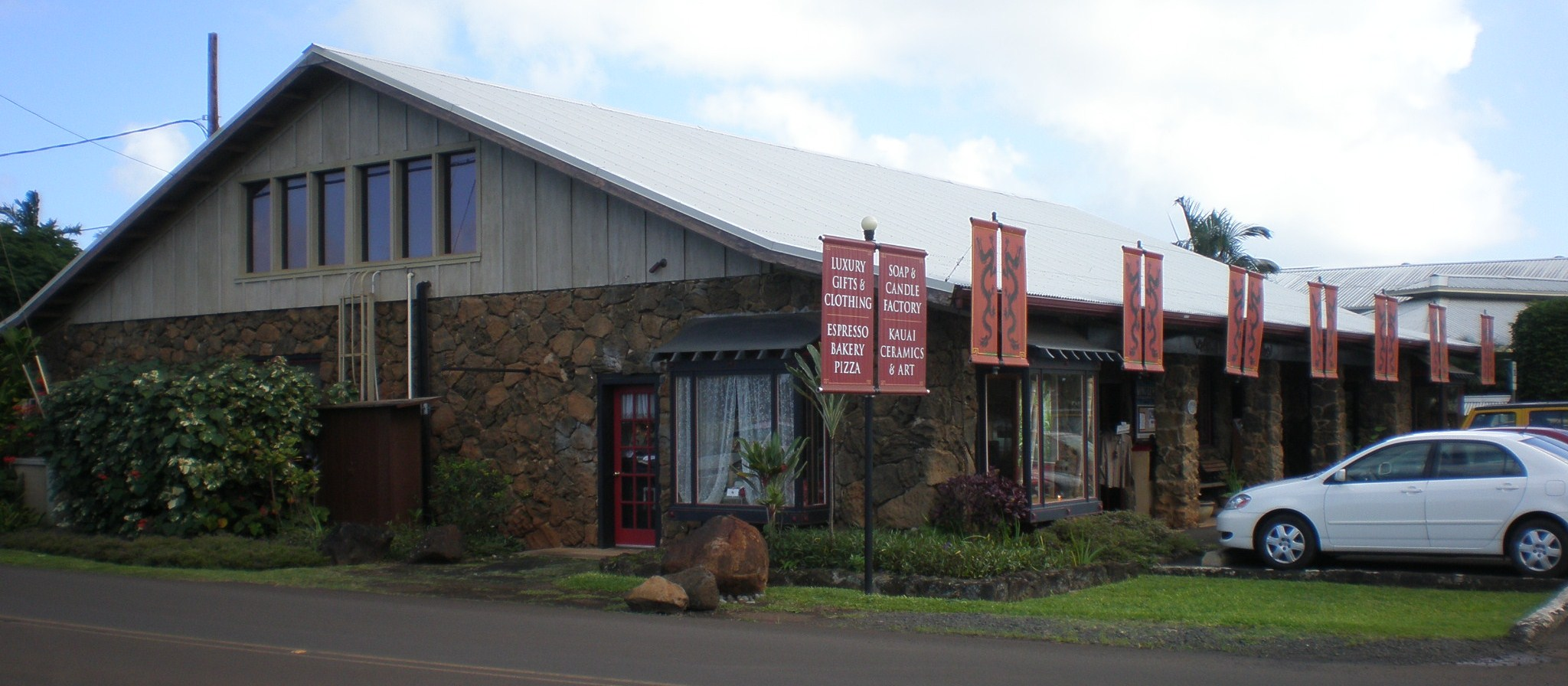
Kong Lung Store

This was a grocery store for plantation workers, located on W. side of Lighthouse Rd., about .5 mi N. of HI 56., and is listed on the National Register. Built in c.1941, it was the last stone building built by the plantation.

== Railway ==
The Kīlauea Sugar Plantation Railway or Kīlauea Track Line was the 12 1/2 miles (20 km) long narrow gauge railway network with a gauge of 2 ft (610 mm) for transporting sugarcane and sugar.
