= Mary Point Estate =

- U.S. National Register of Historic Places
- U.S. Historic district
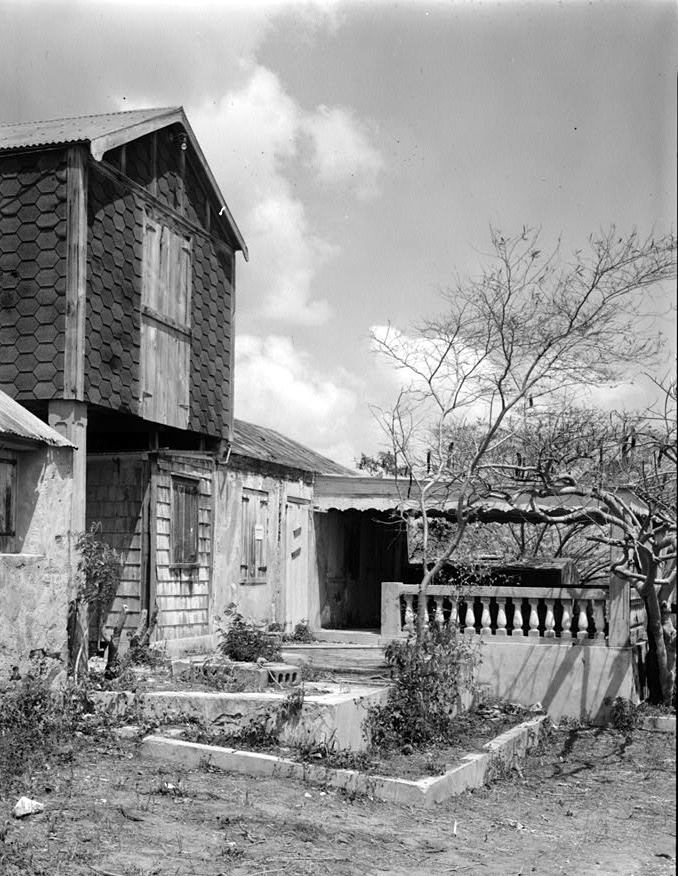
- Great House at Mary Point Estate

- Location within the U.S. Virgin Islands
- Coordinates: 18°22′4″N 64°44′31″W
- MPS: Virgin Islands National Park MRA (AD)
- NRHP reference No.: 78000272
- Added to NRHP: May 22, 1978

Mary Point Estate is a historic property located on the north coast of Saint John, United States Virgin Islands on Mary's Point. The plantation was added to the U.S. National Register of Historic Places on May 22, 1978.

== History ==
The land on which Mary Point Estate is located was originally held by Danish West India and Guinea Company officials during the early years of Danish settlement. Not being prime land for planting, the land was held until new settlers needed property. The van Stell family was the first controlling landholding on Mary's Point.

In the aftermath of the 1733 slave insurrection on St. John, Franz Claasen was deeded the Mary's Point estate for alerting the family of the rebellion and assisting in their escape to St. Thomas, a nearby island. Franz Claasen's land deed was recorded on August 20, 1738, by Jacob van Stell. Claasen was the first "Free Colored" landowner on St. John.

Augustus Kragh and the Grancis family were owners of the Mary Point Estate during the late 18th century. Hans Hendrik Berg, a governor and president of St. John and St. Thomas, was an owner of the Mary Point Estate during the 19th century. During this time an L-shaped factory and the one-story Great House were constructed on the property. In addition to the Great House, a servant's quarters, farm building, and cemetery remain.

The St. John Historical Society recorded Mary's Point as a cotton plantation, but noted that sugar was grown there in the 19th century.

== Gallery ==
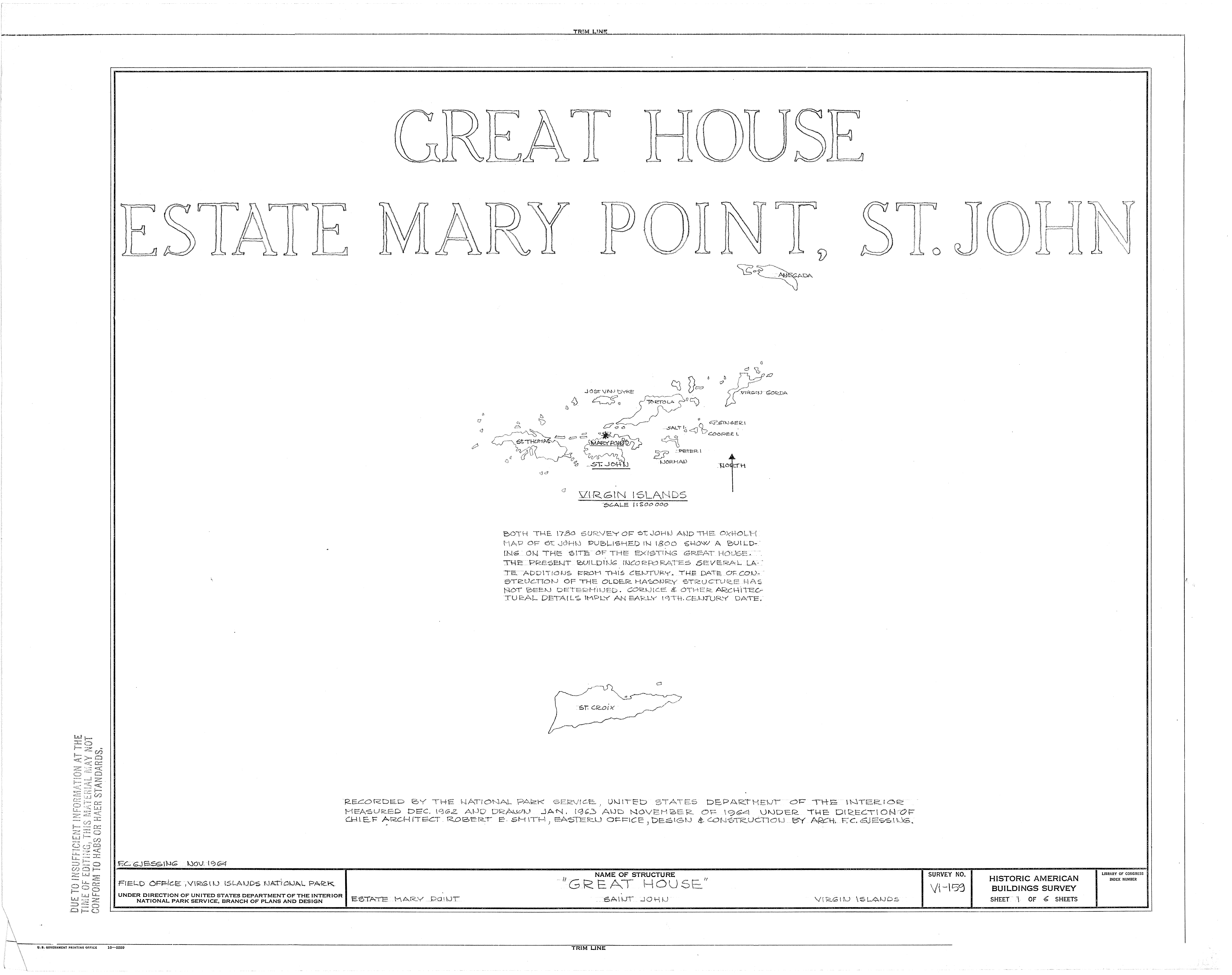
HABS: Location plan.

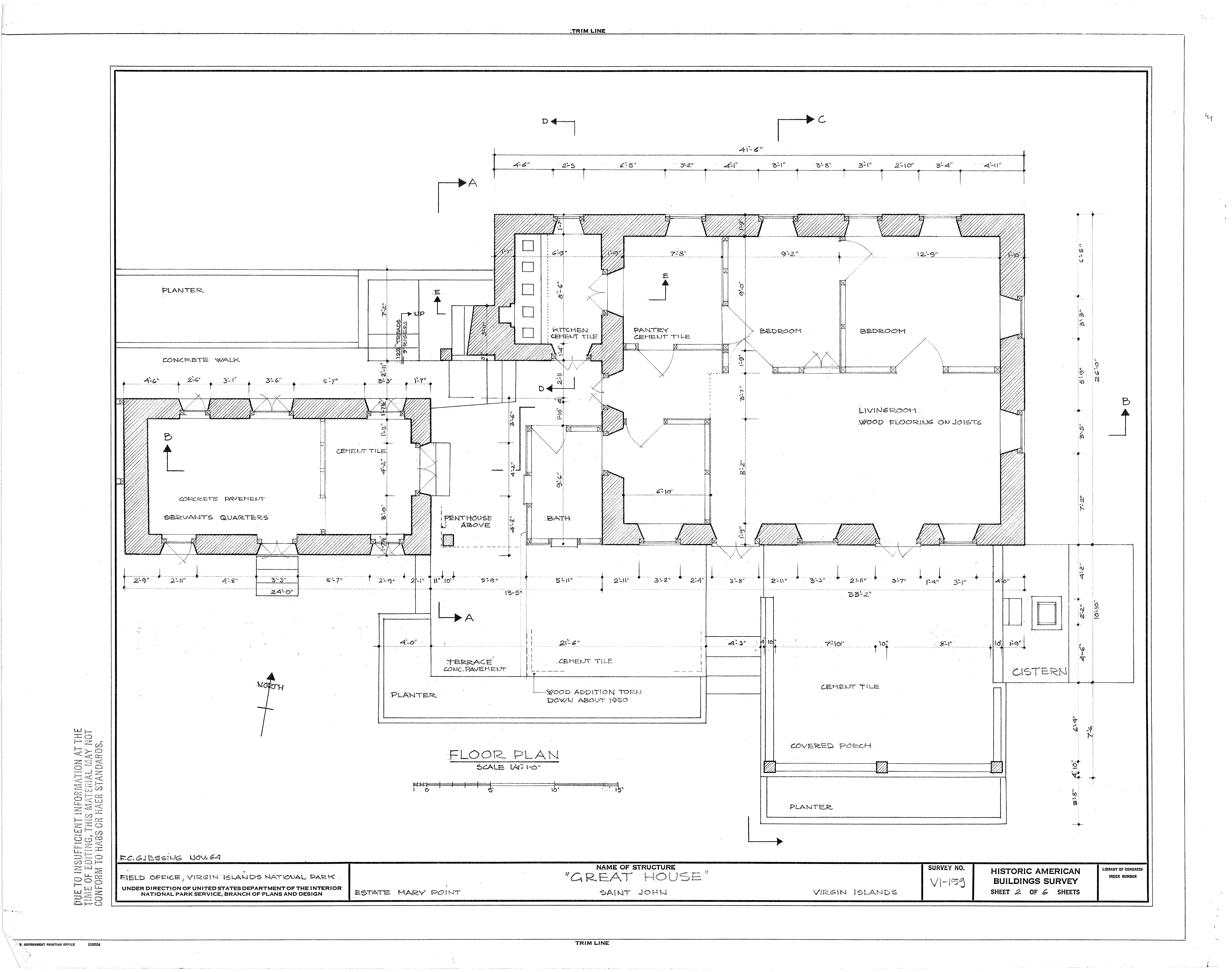
HABS: Great House plan drawing.

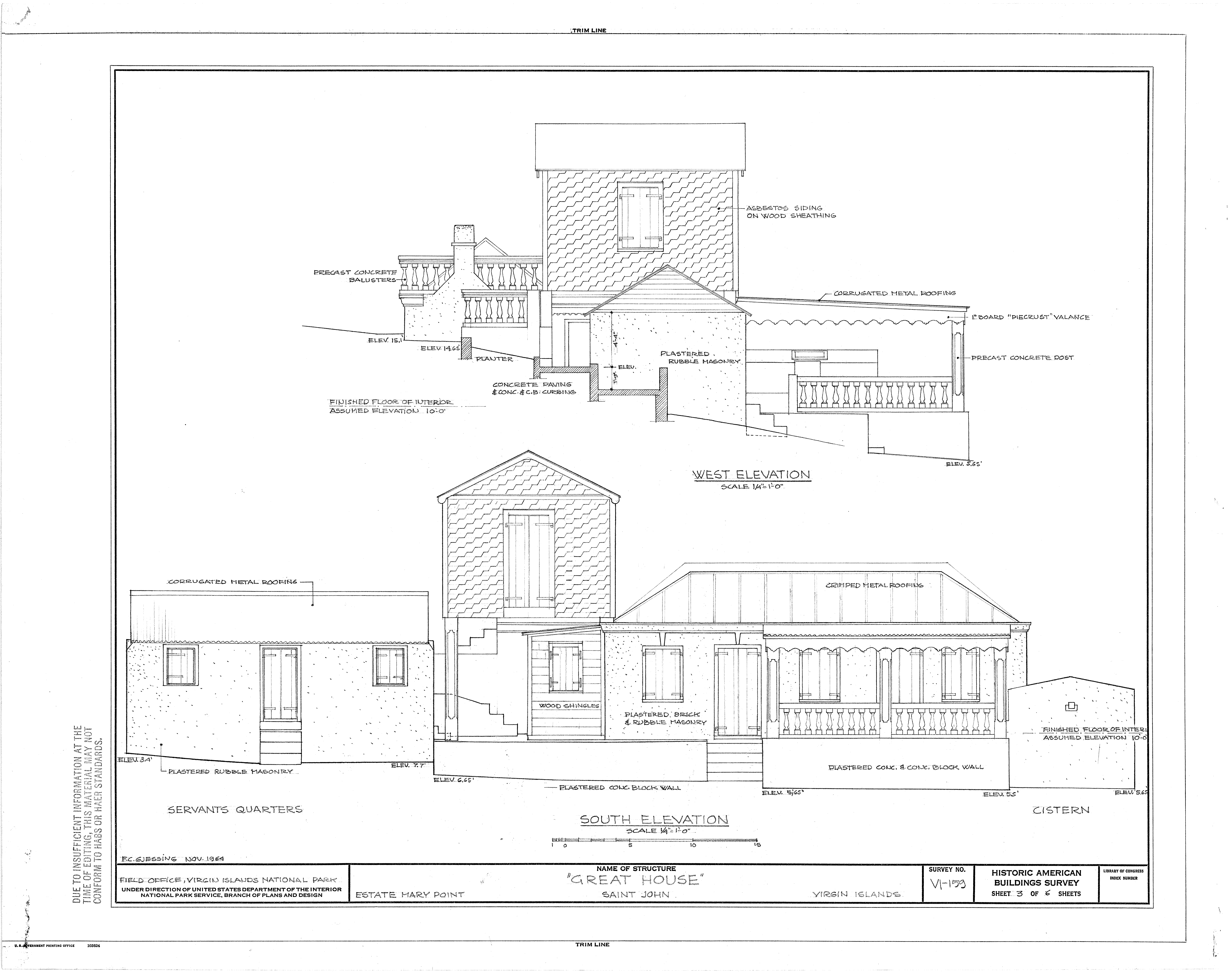
HABS: Great House elevation drawings.

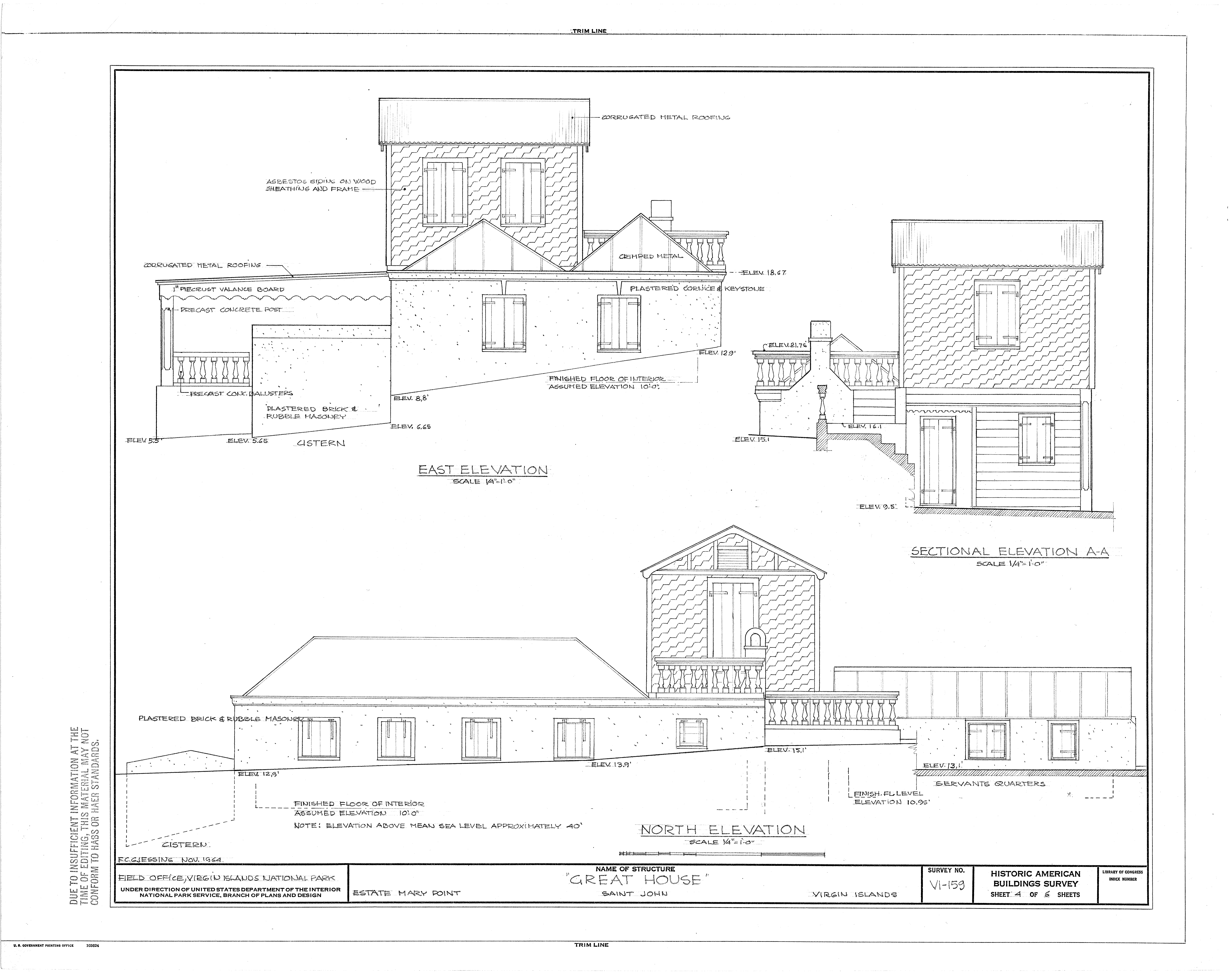
HABS: Great House elevation drawings.

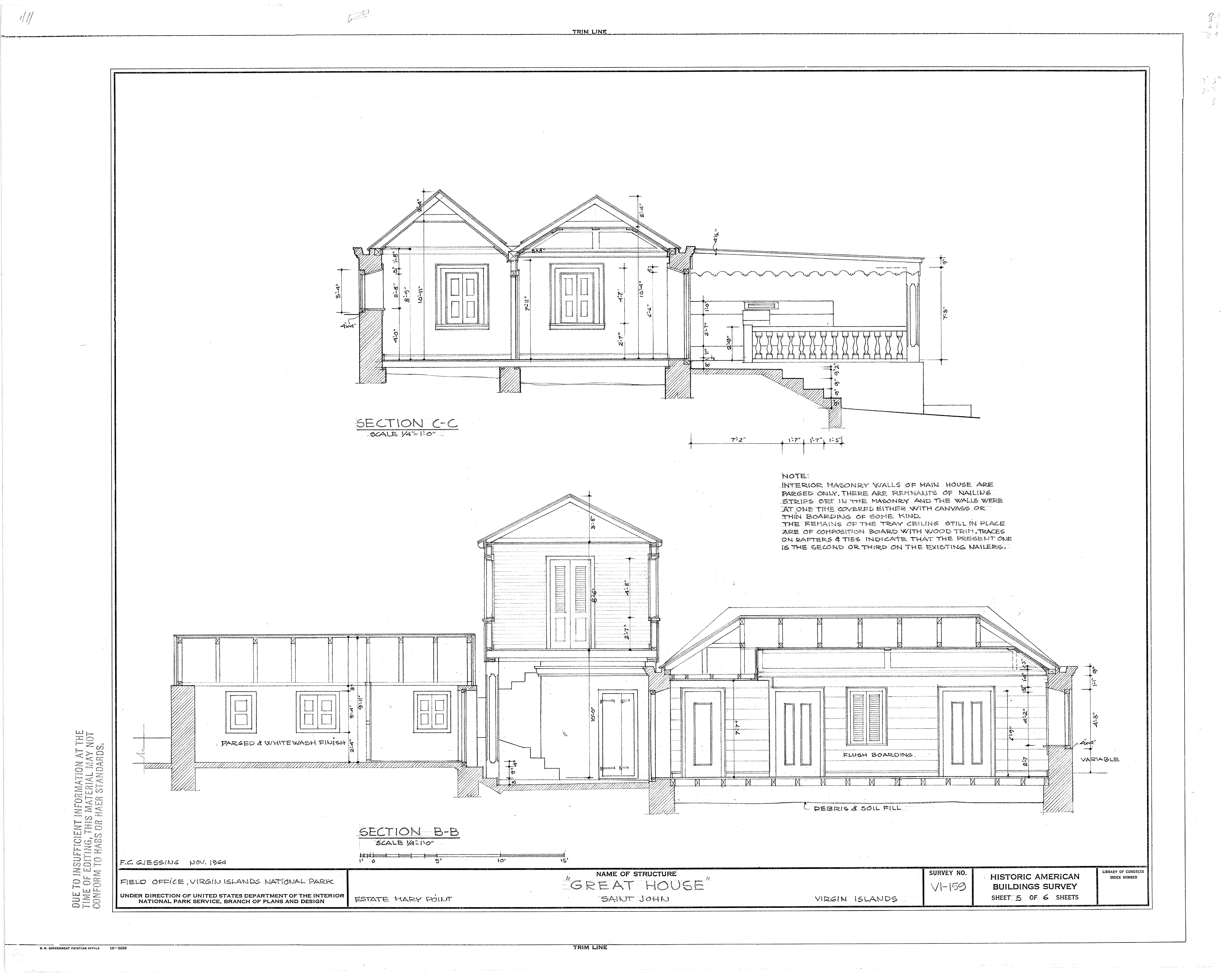
HABS: Great House section drawings.

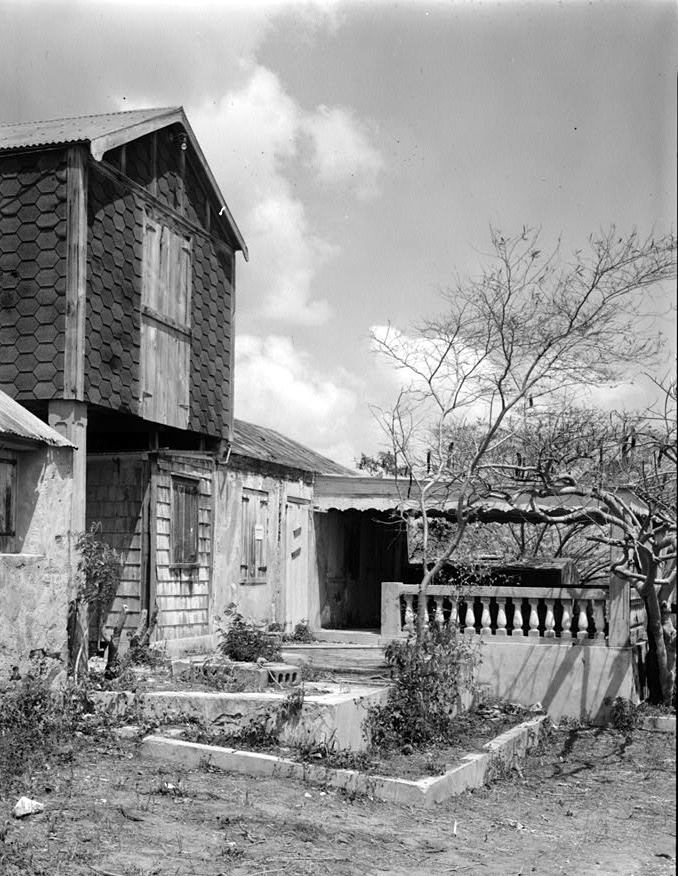
HABS: Great House entrance facade and terrace.

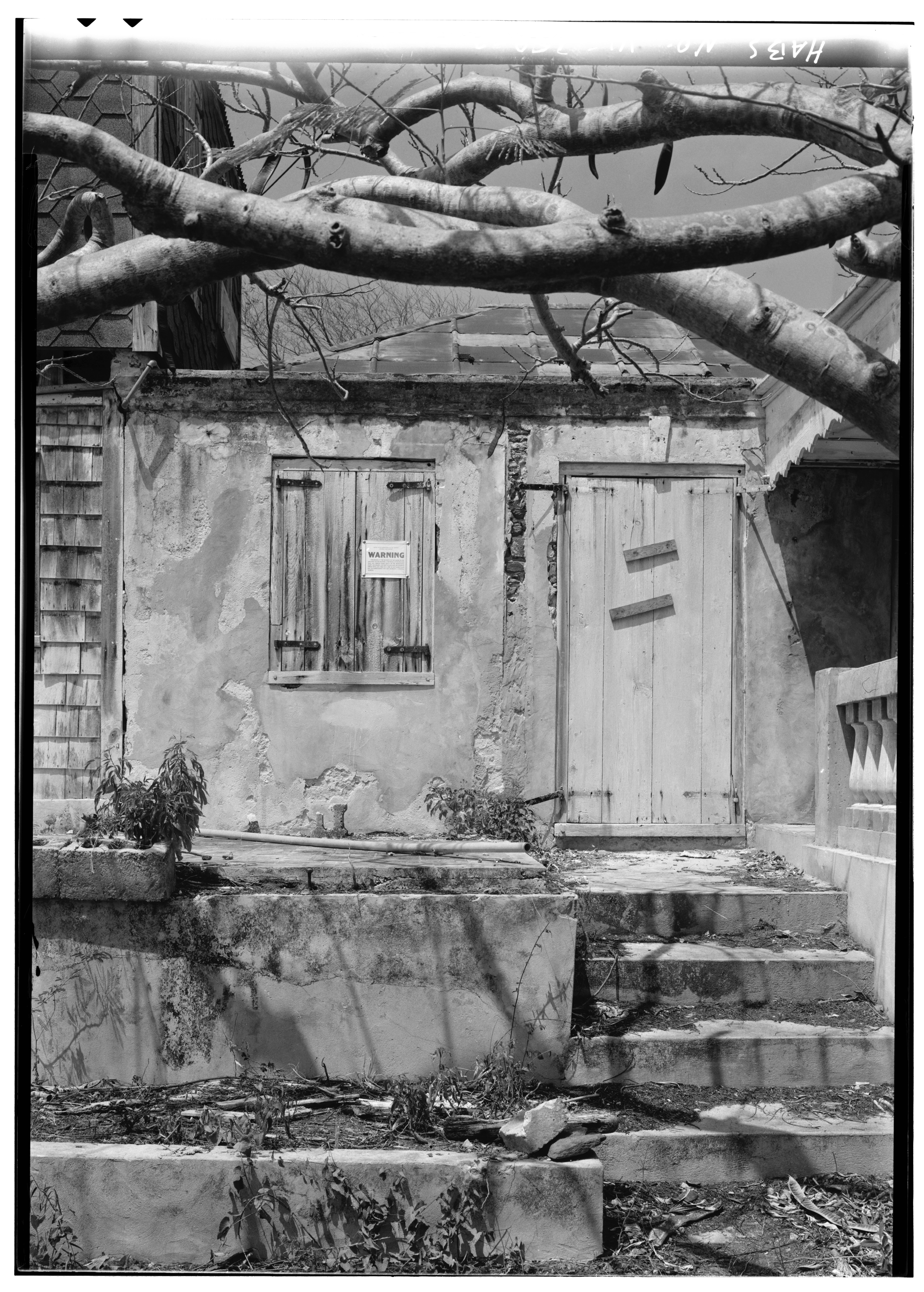
HABS: Great House entrance facade detail

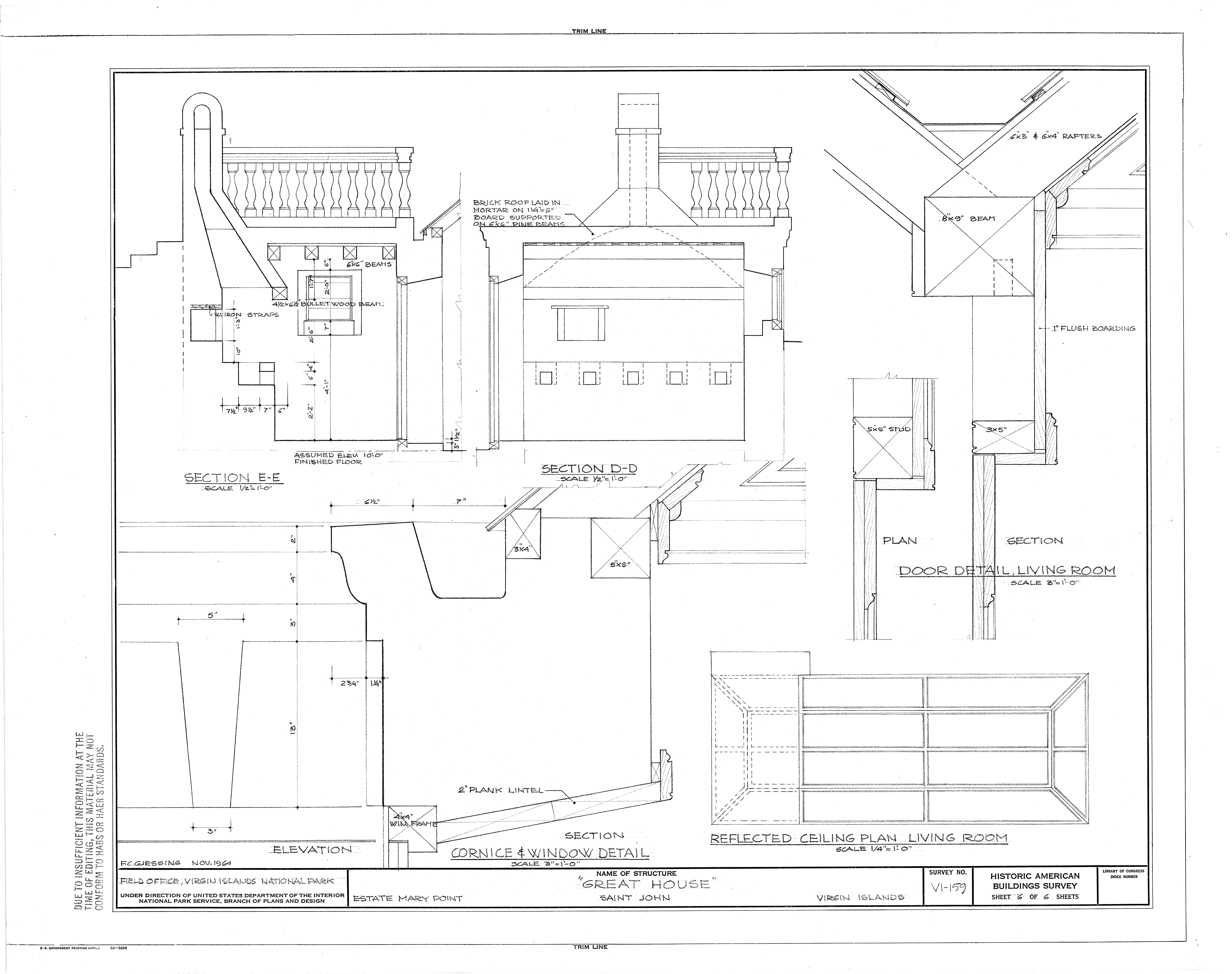
HABS: Great House Kitchen drawings.

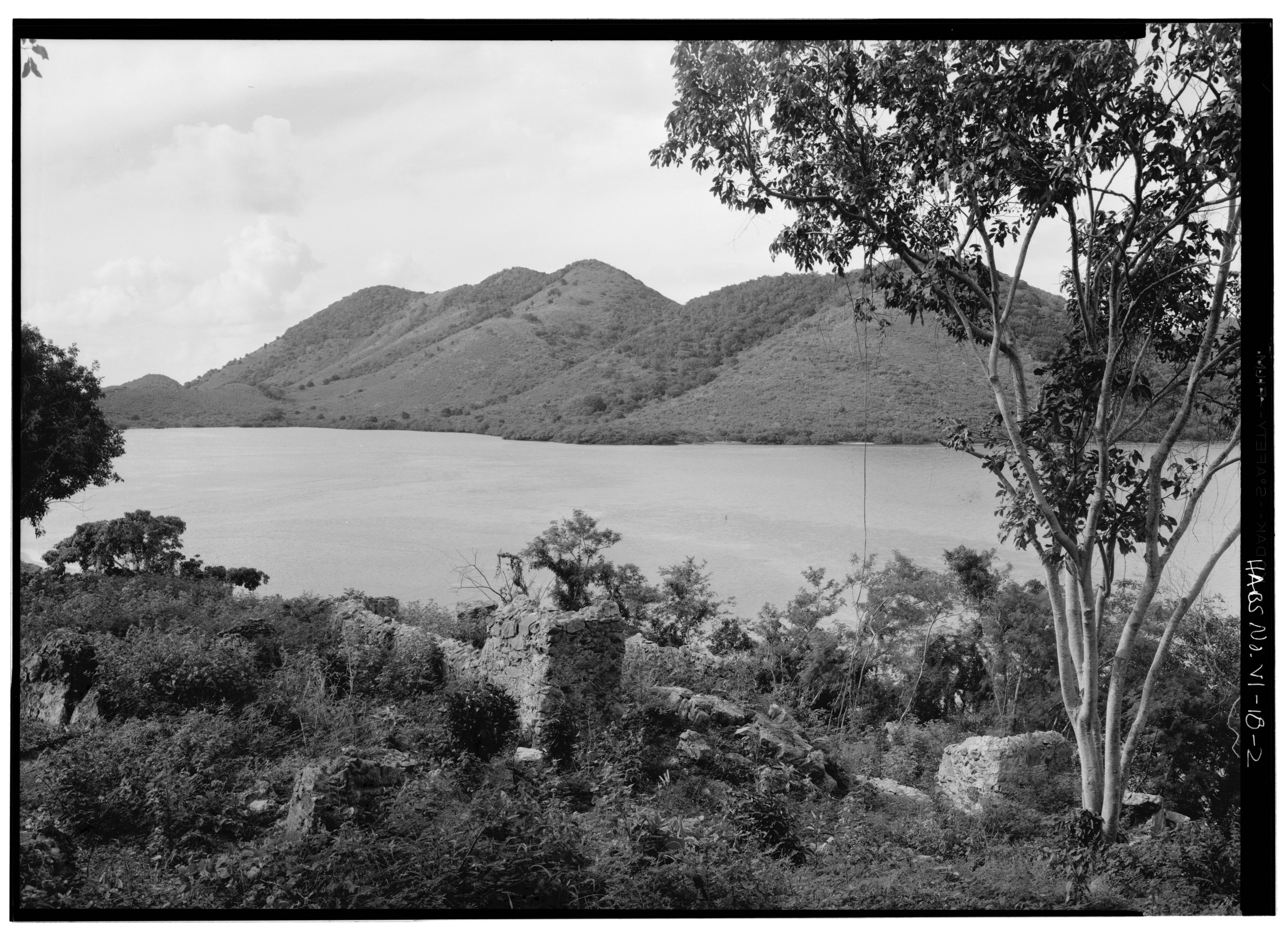
Estate Annaberg ruins (foreground), Estate Mary Point across bay (background).
