= Florence Plantation =

Coordinates: 33.179°N 91.152°W

- Interactive map of Florence Plantation
- Type: Former cotton plantation
- Location: Harwood, Chicot County, Arkansas

The Florence Plantation was a former cotton plantation and is a historic site, located in the community of Harwood in Chicot County, Arkansas.

== History ==
On December 8, 1870, John C. Calhoun II and Lennie (Linnie) Adams married. He was the grandson of U.S. Vice President John C. Calhoun and brother of Patrick Calhoun. Lennie Adams, was the daughter of Betsy Johnson of the Lakeport Plantation. With this marriage, Lennie Adams inherited the Florence Plantation, a 3,600-acre plantation (with 200 acres in cultivation). Lennie Adams maintained legal ownership of the property for approximately the next 8 years.

Prior to 1870, John C. Calhoun II had been an American Civil War veteran serving in the Confederate States Army and he had been in an active partnership in 1866 with James R. Powell (of Montgomery, Alabama) in order to, "colonize Negros in the Yazoo Valley, Mississippi to work on plantation lands on a cooperative basis." This labor model proved profitable for Calhoun, and by the time he moved to Arkansas he was ready to scale this labor model to a larger size.

The Florence Plantation came with 20 Black laborers, and Calhoun brought 150 Black laborers, many of which were once enslaved on his family plantations in Alabama and had acquired past debts. By 1883, there were 260 Black laborers and 1600 acres in cultivation. According to journalist Frank Wilkeson in 1883, Calhoun made sure the workers were not in current debt, and earning enough to live in relative comfort.

By 1881, the family was acquiring large tracts of land to add to the site. Calhoun purchased many nearby plantations to add to their collection. To help in the purchase of these properties, Calhoun created a few businesses including one named the Florence Planting Company.

In 1915, the plantation was listed for sale by the heirs of Joseph P. Alexander and advertised as "a baronial estate at the price of a farm", with "5,000 acres, 34 good mules, residence and 40 tenant houses."

In 1953, Jack Vaughan sued Carneal Warfield over the ownership of the plantation.
