= List of settlements in the United States Virgin Islands =

List of settlements and estates in the United States Virgin Islands, sorted by island.

== Saint Croix ==
- Allandale
- Altona
- Anguilla
- Annaly
- Annaberg
- Annas Hope
- Beck Grove
- Beeston Hill
- Bellevue
- Belvedere
- Bethlehem Old Work
- Bettys Hope
- Betzys Jewell
- Blessing
- Bodkin
- Bonne Esperance
- Bugbyhole
- Bulows Minde
- Butler Bay
- Butzberg
- Camporico
- Canaan
- Cane
- Cane Valley
- Canebay
- Carden
- Carlton
- Castle Coakley
- Catharinas Hope
- Cathrines Rest
- Christiansted
- Clairmont
- Clifton Hill
- Coble
- Concordia
- Contentment
- Cooper
- Cotton Grove
- Cotton Valley
- Diamond
- Diamond Keturah
- Envy
- Fareham
- Fort Frederick
- Fountain
- Fredensborg
- Fredensdal
- Frederiks Haab
- Frederiksted
- Friedensfeld
- Glynn
- Golden Grove
- Good Hope
- Granard
- Grange
- Great Pond
- Green Kay
- Grove Place
- Hams Bay
- Hard Labour
- Hermitage
- Hesselberg
- Hogensborg
- Hope
- Humbug
- Jealousy
- Jerusalem and Figtree Hill
- Jolly Hill
- Kingshill
- Knight
- La Grande Princesse
- La Grange
- La Reine
- La Vallee
- Laprey Valley
- Libanon Hill
- Limetree
- Little Fountain
- Longford
- Lower Love
- Lowrys Hill
- Madame Carty
- Mon Bijou
- Montpellier
- Morningstar
- Mount Pleasant
- Munster
- Negro Bay
- Nicholas
- North Side
- North Star
- Nugent
- Orange Grove
- Orangegrove
- Oxford
- Paradise
- Parasol
- Pearl
- Peters Rest
- Petronella
- Pleasant Vale
- Plessen
- Profit
- Prosperity
- Punch
- Rattan and Belvedere
- Recovery Hill
- Richmond
- Robe Hill
- Ruan Bay
- Ruby
- Ryan
- Saint John
- Saint Peter
- Sallys Fancy
- Sandy Point
- Seven Hills
- Shoys
- Sion Farm
- Sion Hill
- Slob
- Smithfield
- Solitude
- Southgate
- Spanish Town
- Sprat Hall Beach
- Springfield
- Strawberry Hill
- Sunny Isle
- Teagues Bay
- Testman
- Two Brothers
- Upper Bethlehem
- Upper Love
- Waldberggaard
- Wheel of Fortune
- Whim
- Whites Bay
- William
- Williams Delight
- Windsor

== Saint Thomas ==
- Adelphi
- Altona
- Anna's Retreat
- Barrett
- Bellevue
- Benner
- Bolongo
- Bovoni
- Bonne Esperance
- Cabritaberg
- Bonne Resolution
- Caret Bay Estate
- Cassi Hill
- Charlotte Amalie
- Charlotte Amalie West
- Contant
- Cowell Battery
- Donoe
- Dorothea
- Enighed
- Ensomned
- Estate Thomas
- Fort Christian
- Fortuna
- Frenchtown
- Frydendal
- Hoffman
- John Oley
- Lerkenlund
- Lilliendahl
- Louisenhoj
- Lovenlund
- Mafolie
- Mandal
- Mariendal
- Misgen
- Nadir
- Nazareth
- Neltjeberg
- Pearson Gardens
- Peterborg
- Raphune
- Red Hook
- Rosendal
- Santa Maria Estate
- Solberg
- Sorgenfri
- Tutu
- Zambee

== Saint John ==
- Adrian
- Annaberg
- Bethany
- Bordeaux
- Calabash
- Carolina
- Concordia
- Contant
- Coral Bay
- Cruz Bay
- East End
- Emmaus
- Enighed
- Fish Bay
- Fredriksdal
- Hermitage
- Johns Folly
- L'Esperance
- Lameshur
- Leinster Bay
- Maho Bay
- Mandal
- Mary Point
- Mollendal
- Monte
- Mount Pleasant
- Palestina
- Reef Bay
- Sieben
- Susannaberg
- Windberg

== See also ==
- Districts and sub-districts of the United States Virgin Islands
- Islands of U.S. Virgin Islands
- Minor islands of the United States Virgin Islands
