= Northside, U.S. Virgin Islands =

Northside Nordside (Danish)
- Subdistrict
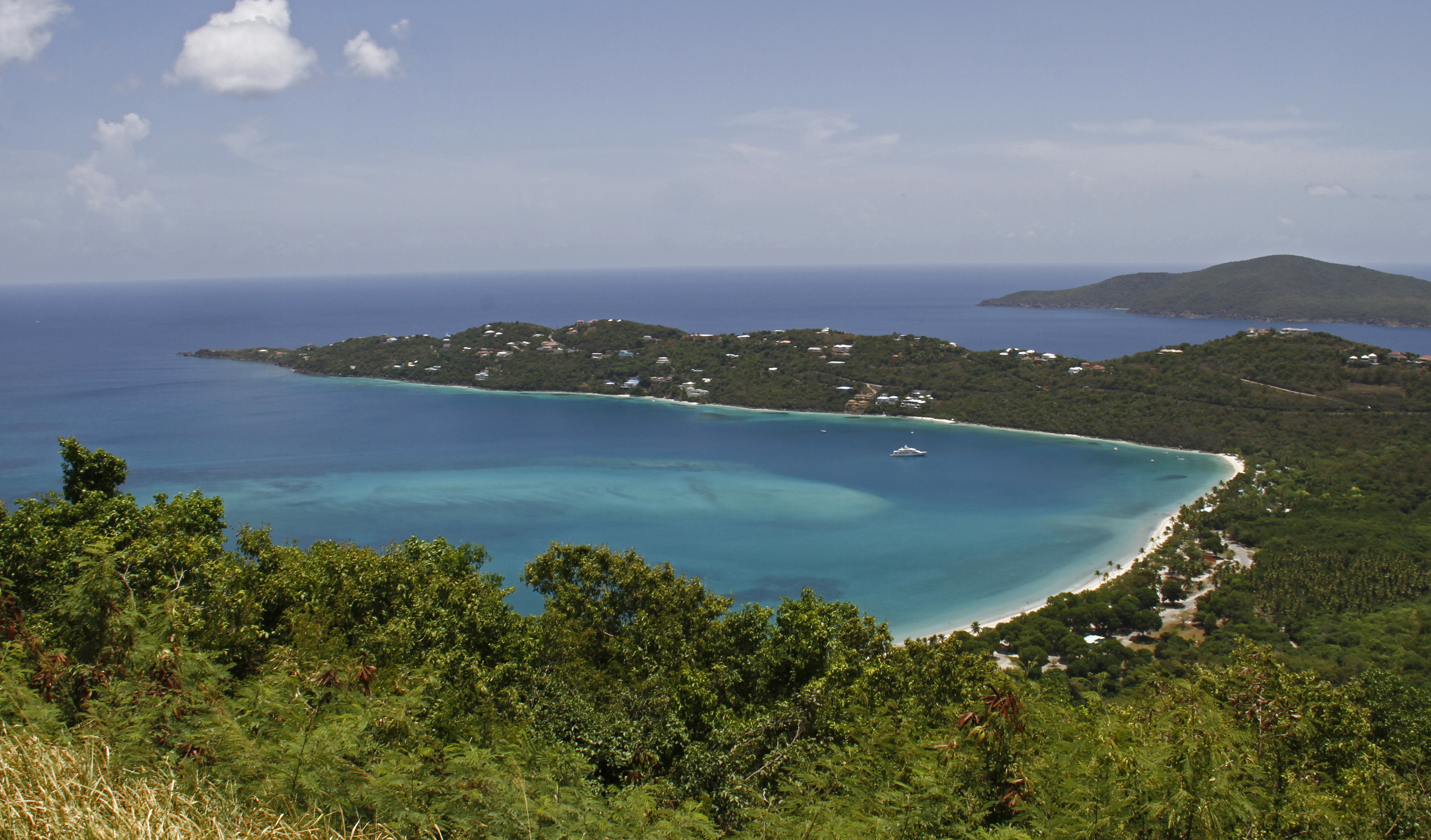
- Magens Bay in northern Saint Thomas is a popular tourist attraction in the U.S.V.I.

- Location within the United States Virgin Islands
- Coordinates: 18°22′N 64°56′W
- Country: United States
- Territory: U.S. Virgin Islands
- District: Saint Thomas

Population (2010)
  - Total: 10,049

Northside with its population of 10,049 as of the 2010 United States census is the second-most populous administrative census subdistrict (CSD) on Saint Thomas, only less populated than the Charlotte Amalie subregion with the islands’ territorial capital of more than 18,000 people. Northside is sometimes called Nordside in Virgin Islands Creole, which is the Danish translation for north side. Northside is home to communities such as Neltjeberg, Zambee, Resolution, Ensomned, Barrett, Solberg, Lerkenlund, Misgen, Mafolie, Louisenhoj, Estate Thomas, Mandal, Enighed, Canaan, and Peterborg. By area, the Northside subdistrict is the largest administrative census sub-district on the Saint Thomas island.

The population here increased by 1,337 additional residents between the 2000 U.S. census, when the population was 8,712, and the 2010 United States census, which showed a population of 10,049. The Northside is particularly known for its many great vistas and overlook points, as well as beaches and bays, maybe especially Magens Bay, which is a popular tourist attraction. Offshore islands such as Hans Lollik Island, Little Hans Lollik Island, Inner Brass- and Outer Brass Islands, as well as numerous smaller islets and cays are parts of the subdistrict.
