= West End, Saint Thomas, U.S. Virgin Islands =

West End Vestende (Danish)
- Subdistrict
- Location within the United States Virgin Islands
- Coordinates: 18°21′N 65°01′W
- Country: United States
- Territory: U.S. Virgin Islands
- District: Saint Thomas

Population (2010)
  - Total: 2,241

West End (Danish: Vestende) is the name of one of the seven census subdistricts (CSD) on the island of Saint Thomas in the United States Virgin Islands. Some of the populated communities here include Adelphi, John Oley, Sorgenfri, Fortuna, and Bonne Esperance. According to the U.S. Bureau of the Census in 2010, the total population is 2,241, which is an increase of 8.9% from the 2000 U.S. Census, when 2,056 lived in the West End subdistrict. According to the Census of 2010, there are 1,128 housing units in the subdistrict, which is only less than Water Island subdistrict with its 203 housing units.
