= Bonne-Espérance (disambiguation) =

Bonne-Espérance and Bonne-Esperance which is French for "Good Hope" may refer to:

- Bonne-Espérance, Belgium, the location of Bonne-Espérance Abbey
- Bonne-Espérance, Quebec, municipality in the Côte-Nord region of the province of Quebec in Canada
- Bonne Esperance, United States Virgin Islands (disambiguation):
  - Bonne Esperance, Saint Croix, United States Virgin Islands
  - Bonne Esperance, Saint Thomas, U.S. Virgin Islands
