= Bonne Esperance, U.S. Virgin Islands =

Bonne Esperance, U.S. Virgin Islands may refer to:

- Bonne Esperance, Saint Thomas, U.S. Virgin Islands
- Bonne Esperance, Saint Croix, U.S. Virgin Islands
