= Sprat Hall Beach, U.S. Virgin Islands =

Coordinates: 17°44′33″N 64°53′32″W

Sprat Hall, United States Virgin Islands
- Village
- Interactive map of Sprat Hall, United States Virgin Islands
- Country: United States Virgin Islands
- Island: Saint Croix
- Time zone: UTC-4 (AST)

Sprat Hall is an estate on the island of Saint Croix in the United States Virgin Islands.

== History ==
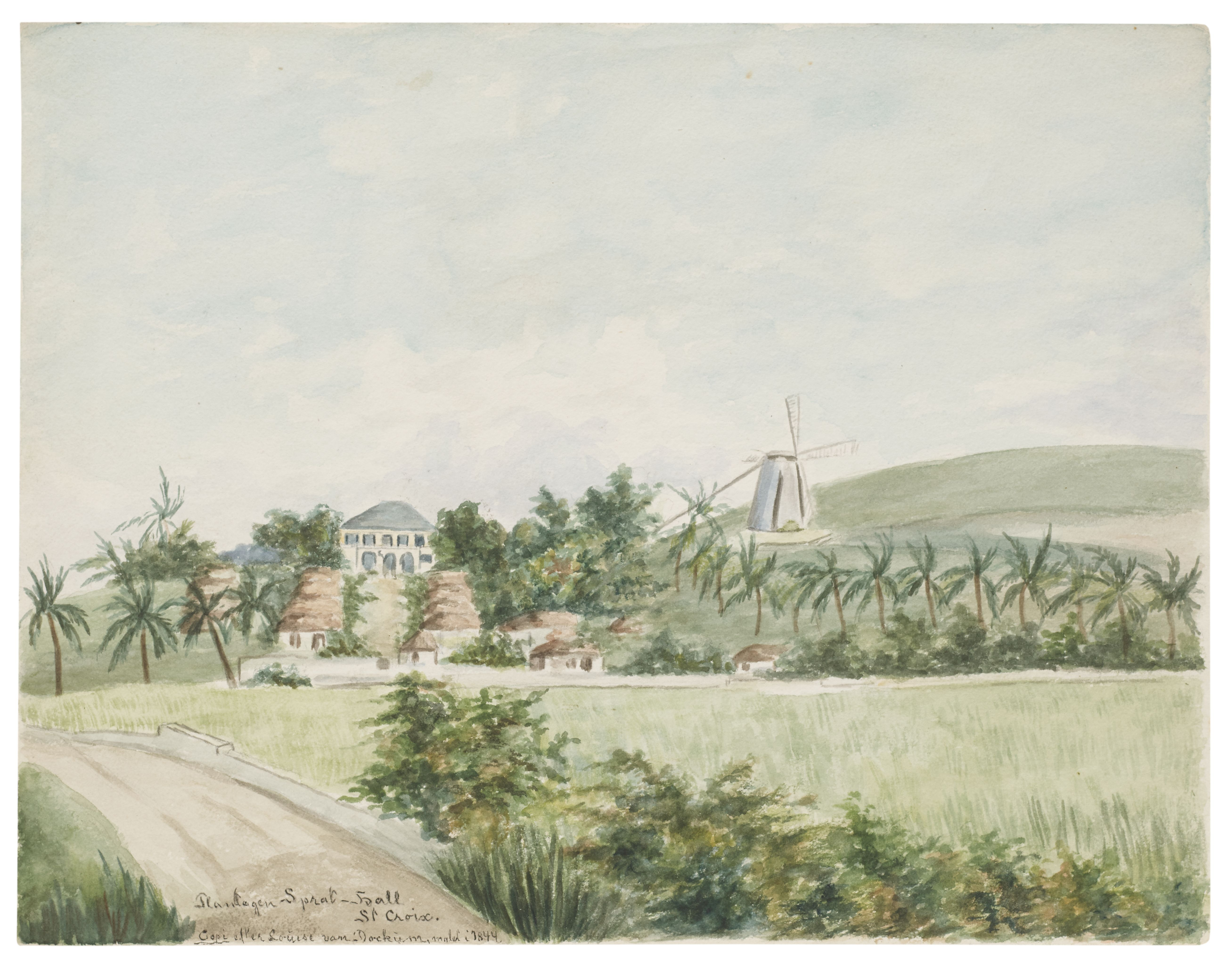
Watercolour of Sprat Hall.

Sprat Hall sugar plantation traces its history back to 1549,

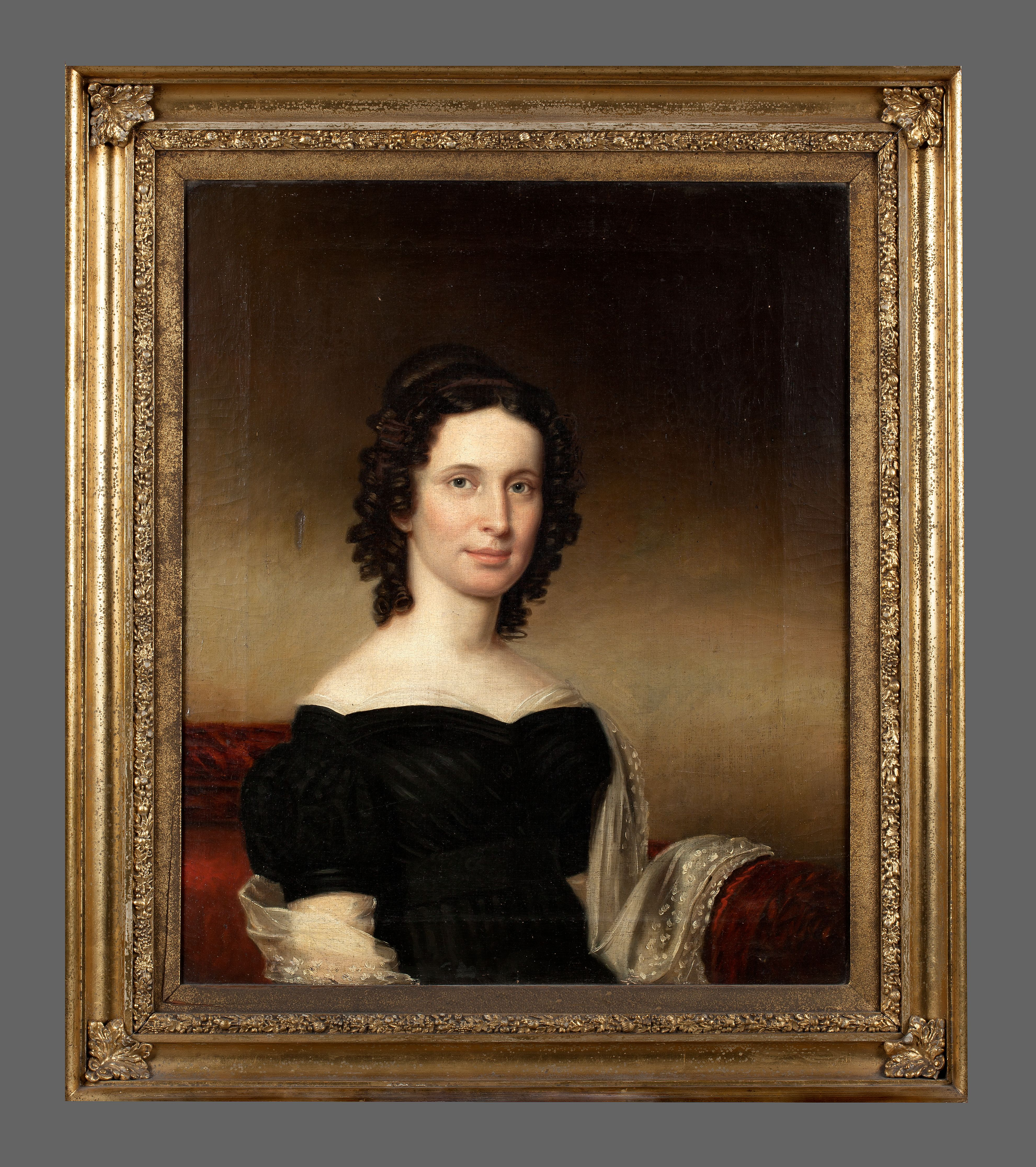
Louise Mathilde MacPherson.

The plantation was for a while owned by Louise Mathilde MacPherson (1818 in Christiansted - 1845 in Copenhagen). She married on Nay 7, 1837 at Sprat Hall to Frederik Christopher Høst Bauditz (1807 in Kiel - 1854).

In 1856, Sprat Hall was acquired by Christian Ulrik Dam and H. Kofoed. The two new owners were both from the Danish island of Bornholm. Dam had moved to St. Croix in 1841. He had previously worked as manager of the plantations St. Georgs Hill, Hope and Hoegenborg. In 1865, Dam Kofoed sold Sprat Hall to Jens Kofoed. Dam became manager of Sion Hill before moving back to Bornholm in 1873. Hans Kofoed was also born at Klemensker in 1821. He moved to St. Croix in 1841, beginning his career in the plantation industry as an overseer at Morningstar. By 1846, he had become manager of Montpellier. In 1850, he became manager of Mountain. Jens Kofoed spent 20 years at Sprat Hall. In 1885, he sold the plantation to Hans Jacob Kofoed. The new owner was also from Bornholm. He was born at Klemensker in 1852 and moved to St. Croix in 1871. He died at St. Croix on 29 May 1924.

Sprat Hall was acquired by Miles Merwin, of Rob’t. L. Merwin & Co.in 1925. He lived on the estate with his wife and six children. Sprat Hall greathouse was later passed to his daughter Joyce.
