= List of killings by law enforcement officers in the United States, January 2022 =

This is a list of people reported killed by non-military law enforcement officers in the United States in January 2022, whether in the line of duty or not, and regardless of reason or method. The listing documents the occurrence of a death, making no implications regarding wrongdoing or justification on the part of the person killed or officer involved. Killings are arranged by date of the incident that caused death. Different death dates, if known, are noted in the description. The table below lists 103 people.

== January 2022 ==
Date	Name (age) of deceased	Race	State (city)	Description
2022-01-31	Michael Allen Haas (37)	White	Mishawaka, Indiana	Mishawaka police were called to Village Green Mobile Home Park twice on reports of a man threatening people with a firearm. On the second call, a man later identified as Michael Allen Haas fired at police. The police returned fire and shot Haas. Haas was then taken to a South Bend hospital where he later died.
2022-01-31	Joseph Wayne Butler (40)	White	Mesquite, Texas	
2022-01-31	Michael J. Trappett (48)	White	Orofino, Idaho	
2022-01-31	Xueqi Li (67)	Asian	Covina, California	
2022-01-30	Elijah Morley (22)	White	Andersonville, Tennessee	
2022-01-30	Dustin Dienst	Unknown race	Andersonville, Tennessee	
2022-01-30	Dyonta Quarles Jr. (20)	Black	Crofton, Maryland	
2022-01-29	Abigail Bieber (30)	White	St. Augustine, Florida	Bieber, a Hillsborough County deputy, was shot and killed by her boyfriend, a Hillsborough County detective, in a murder-suicide during a vacation in St. Augustine.
2022-01-29	David Christopher Chernosky (28)	White	Denton, Texas	
2022-01-29	Joon Han (30)	Asian	West Buechel, Kentucky	An off-duty New Albany, Indiana Police officer shot and killed Han in a murder-suicide. Neighbors said Han was the officer's girlfriend.
2022-01-29	Donald Sahota (52)	White	Battle Ground, Washington	Sahota, an off-duty Vancouver Police officer, fought with a robbery suspect who had arrived at his home. After the suspect stabbed him, Sahota chased the suspect while holding his firearm as the suspect ran towards his house. Police say a Clark County Sheriff's Deputy arriving at the scene mistook Sahota for the suspect and shot him. The suspect was charged with the murder. The prosecutor's office declined to charge the deputy.
2022-01-28	Daniel Alfonso Perez-Comunidad (19)	Hispanic	Coachella, California	
2022-01-28	Mitchell Ryan Hooe (28)	White	Springfield, Missouri	
2022-01-27	Brenda Liz Pérez Bahamonde (46)	Hispanic	Salinas, Puerto Rico	Pérez Bahamonde, a Puerto Rico Police officer, was shot and killed by her husband, fellow officer José Rivera Velázquez. Pérez Bahamonde had obtained a protection order against Rivera Velázquez, but she had withdrawn it and his service weapon had been returned to him.
2022-01-27	Landon Eastep (37)	White	Nashville, Tennessee	Nine officers shot Eastep after a standoff on a highway overpass. Body cam footage shows officers shoot Eastep after he made a swift motion with his arms. Eastep was carrying a box cutter. Of the nine officers, six were from the Metropolitan Nashville Police Department, two were from the Tennessee Highway Patrol, and one was an off-duty Mt. Juliet officer. One of the Nashville officers was stripped of his police powers following the incident.
2022-01-27	Jerome Holman	Unknown	Parkland, Washington	Deputies responded to reports of a suspicious vehicle. Deputies shot and killed an individual. The department is withholding all additional details at this time.
2022-01-26	John Hunt (20)	Black	Cordova, Tennessee	
2022-01-26	Wesley Chance (32)	White	Portland, Oregon	
2022-01-26	John Paul Romero (42)	Hispanic	Rio Rancho, New Mexico	
2022-01-26	Equan Hopson (23)	Black	Ferguson, Missouri	
2022-01-25	Floyd Michael Woody (68)	White	Dandridge, Tennessee	
2022-01-25	Derick Rock (30)	White	Aragon, Georgia	
2022-01-25	Ronnie D. Walker (58)	White	Fredricktown, Missouri	
2022-01-24	Peterson Kamo (23)	Unknown	Spokane, Washington	Police responded to a welfare check after dispatch received an emergency call from Kamo's mother. As officers approached the residence one officer observed Kamo holding a knife to the throat of a small child. Officers attempted to de-escalate the situation, at which point Kamo retreated upstairs with the child. Officers fired shots a short time later, striking Kamo. Kamo was taken to a hospital where he was pronounced dead.
2022-01-24	Bradley James Ellison (48)	White	Priceville, Alabama	
2022-01-24	Amanda Alvarez-Calo (31)	Latino	Chicago, Illinois	An Illinois State Trooper shot and killed his wife before killing himself.
2022-01-23	Paul Courtemanche (42)	White	Burlington, Massachusetts	
2022-01-23	Bobby Lee Sutton (59)	Black	Atlanta, Georgia	
2022-01-23	Christopher "Chris" Jones (17)	Black	O’Fallon, Missouri	
2022-01-23	Tyron Coates (23)	Black	Lafayette, Louisiana	
2022-01-23	Sean Michael Kinney (37)	Unknown race	Newnan, Georgia	
2022-01-23	William "Billy" Atkins (41)	White	Fort Knox, Kentucky	
2022-01-23	Jeffrey Thomas (24)	Black	Ringold, Georgia	
2022-01-23	Francisco Junior Lopez (36)	Hispanic	Hallettsville, Texas	
2022-01-22	Dedrick Garcia (37)	Hispanic	Phoenix, Arizona	
2022-01-22	Tymel Bowman (43)	Black	Springfield, Missouri	
2022-01-21	Lashawn McNeil (47)	Black	New York City, New York	McNeil fired on two officers responding to a domestic call, fatally wounding both, before a third officer shot him. McNeil died in hospital on January 24.
2022-01-20	Nelson Szeto (37)	Asian	San Francisco, California	Szeto was shot and killed by police after a standoff at San Francisco International Airport. Szeto was carrying a knife and had two replica guns. Police say after Szeto set the knife down he pulled out the second replica gun and was shot by police. At one point Szeto allegedly told officers to shoot him.
2022-01-20	Yoskar Feliz (27)	Black	New York, New York	
2022-01-19	Ronald W. Flowers II	Unknown race	Perdido, Alabama	
2022-01-19	Robert Seth Carter (32)	Unknown race	San Jose, California	
2022-01-19	Henry Richards Jr. (41)	Black	Contant, U.S. Virgin Islands	Richards shot four people at a bar in a drive-by shooting before being shot and killed by an off-duty officer.
2022-01-18	Joseph Thomas Tracy IV (20)	Hispanic	Hemet, California	
2022-01-18	Tyler M. Marler (31)	Unknown race	Wood River, Illinois	
2022-01-18	Hector Armando Barba Jr. (33)	Hispanic	Huntington Park, California	
2022-01-18	Unnamed man	Unknown race	Cypress, Texas	
2022-01-17	Nathan Humphrey (28)	Black	Atascocita, Texas	
2022-01-17	Moses Portillo (22)	Hispanic	Puyallup, Washington	A deputy pulled Portillo's vehicle over for a traffic stop. The deputy asked Portillo where the gun was in the car. The situation quickly escalated with the deputy shooting Portillo.
2022-01-16	Junnie Williams (35)	Black	North Charleston, South Carolina	
2022-01-16	Ismael Montes (22)	Unknown race	Gillette, Wyoming	
2022-01-16	Miguel Maldonado (36)	Hispanic	Harrisburg, Pennsylvania	
2022-01-16	Steffon Griffin (31)	White	Toppers, Oklahoma	
2022-01-15	Malik Faisal Akram (44)	South Asian	Colleyville, Texas	Akram, a British national, took four people hostage at a synagogue in Colleyville, near Dallas. After six hours, one hostage was released, and the rest escaped after eleven hours. Akram was then shot and killed by an FBI Hostage Rescue Team.
2022-01-15	Unnamed man	Unknown race	Jurupa Valley, California	
2022-01-14	Raishawn Jones (38)	Black	Durham, North Carolina	
2022-01-14	Barry Dean Compton (64)	Unknown race	Woolwine, Virginia	
2022-01-13	Edgar Morfin Mendoza (26)	Hispanic	Fresno, California	
2022-01-13	Alexander Bogusz (30)	Unknown race	Citrus Heights, California	
2022-01-12	Charles Walker Piquet (51)	Unknown race	Durham, North Carolina	
2022-01-12	Michael Neuman (31)	Unknown race	Jonesboro, Arkansas	
2022-01-12	Michael Scott Meridith (35)	White	Sergeant Bluff, Iowa	
2022-01-12	Kenneth Delton Hutcheson (37)	White	Abbeville, Colorado	
2022-01-12	Autrey Davis (22)	Black	Houston, Texas	
2022-01-11	Megan Joyce Mohn (40)	White	Salt Lake City, Utah	Police responded to a disturbance at a gas station and encountered Mohn holding a piece of rebar. Police restrained Mohn, who fell unconscious and died nineteen days later. Her death was ruled a homicide by a medical examiner.
2022-01-11	Jose Daniel Argueta Turcios (43)	Hispanic	Raleigh, North Carolina	
2022-01-11	Nicholas D. Sebastian (43)	White	Port Barrington, Illinois	
2022-01-11	Jose Juan Marquez (43)	Hispanic	Calimesa, California	
2022-01-10	Isaac Andrade (21)	Hispanic	San Diego, California	
2022-01-10	Isaiah Tyree Williams (19)	Black	Las Vegas, Nevada	Police investigating a homicide entered an apartment on a search warrant when a shootout occurred between Williams and the police. Williams was not the suspect in the homicide, and the actual suspect was not at the apartment at the time.
2022-01-10	Name Withheld (50)	Unknown race	Rancho Cucamonga, California	
2022-01-09	Denrick Demond Stallings (47)	Black	Roberta, Georgia	
2022-01-09	Orlando Taylor III (23)	Black	Springfield, Massachusetts	Police responded to calls about a man armed with a knife threatening someone in the street. After being approached by officers, the man stabbed one of them in the neck before being fatally shot.
2022-01-09	Unnamed man	Unknown race	Rialto, California	
2022-01-09	Saul Betancourt (21)	Hispanic	NEWMAN, California	
2022-01-09	Joshua Mathis (19)	Black	Hillsborough, New Jersey	
2022-01-09	Luis Ku Huitzil (45)	Unknown	Vancouver, Washington	Police responded to reports of a man inside a mobile home armed with knives. The individual reportedly set a fire in the home. Police fired 40mm less lethal rounds at the individual. Police then shot and killed the individual.
2022-01-08	Jason Walker (37)	Black	Fayetteville, North Carolina	Police say an off-duty Cumberland County Sheriff's Deputy shot and killed Walker after he allegedly jumped on the deputy's moving truck. Witnesses claim the deputy's truck struck Walker.
2022-01-08	Deaughn Willis (25)	Black	Baton Rouge, Louisiana	
2022-01-07	Courtney Spraggins (26)	White	Huntsville, Alabama	
2022-01-06	Todd Fiepke	White	Wheat Ridge, Colorado	
2022-01-06	James Sutton (55)	Unknown race	Keansburg, New Jersey	
2022-01-06	Jose Brito Lopez (37)	Unknown	Calhoun, Georgia	Police responded to reports of a burglary and found Lopez holding a knife. An officer shot Lopez after he allegedly walked towards the officer while still carrying the knife.
2022-01-06	Ricardo Otero (30)	Hispanic	Las Vegas, Nevada	
2022-01-05	Tony Edwards (53)	Unknown race	Mayfield, Kentucky	
2022-01-05	Unknown	Unknown race	Prescott, Arizona	
2022-01-05	Rigoberto Brambila-Pelayo	Hispanic	Seattle, Washington	Police shot and killed a man after he allegedly stabbed a police dog, killing it, and stabbing an officer in the face.
2022-01-05	Abdul Timmons (27)	Black	Florence County, South Carolina	Timmons was shot and killed by a sheriff's deputy at a mobile home park. Police say Timmons was armed.
2022-01-05	JD Javier Lane (28)	Latino	Victoria, Texas	After Lane was pulled over on suspicion of robbery, he fled on foot and was shot in the back by a U.S. Deputy Marshal. The deputy marshal stated he mistook a pipe scraper in Lane's hand for a gun. A grand jury declined to indict the marshal.
2022-01-04	Daniel Ackley (33)	White	Millville, New Jersey	
2022-01-04	Carl Schaede (53)	Unknown race	Paulden, Arizona	
2022-01-04	Roman Ivan Kokhanevych (24)	White	Gresham, Oregon	
2022-01-04	Stephanie Wilson (28)	Unknown race	Bahama, North Carolina	
2022-01-04	Vincenzo Rudi (44)	Unknown race	Philadelphia, Pennsylvania	
2022-01-04	Clarence Little (45)	Black	Brooklyn, New York	
2022-01-03	John Sumter Horton (42)	White	Mooresboro, North Carolina	A state trooper arriving to a traffic stop accidentally struck and killed another trooper on scene, as well as the pulled over motorcyclist. The trooper in the patrol car was the brother of the trooper who was killed.
2022-01-03	Dusty Luke Beck (26)	White	Mooresboro, North Carolina	A state trooper arriving to a traffic stop accidentally struck and killed another trooper on scene, as well as the pulled over motorcyclist. The trooper in the patrol car was the brother of the trooper who was killed.
2022-01-03	Caleb Stanford (26)	Unknown race	Mesa, Arizona	
2022-01-03	Charles Corey Castro (54)	Hispanic	Murphy, Idaho	
2022-01-03	James Schild (49)	White	Mesa, Arizona	
2022-01-02	Matthew Elston (51)	Unknown race	Wildomar, California	
2022-01-02	Kadeem Errol Livingston Smith (28)	Black	Pine Hills, Florida	
2022-01-01	James Williams	Black	Canton, Ohio	
2022-01-01	Michael Dobbins (63)	Unknown race	Jonesboro, Louisiana	

== See also ==
- Death in custody § United States
- Henry A. Wallace Police Crime Public Database
- List of cases of police brutality
- List of countries with annual rates and counts for killings by law enforcement officers
- List of law enforcement officers killed in the line of duty in the United States
- List of law enforcement officers convicted for an on-duty killing in the United States
- List of shootings by US immigration agents
- List of police reforms related to the George Floyd protests
- List of unarmed African Americans killed by law enforcement officers in the United States
- Lists of killings by law enforcement officers
- Police brutality in the United States
- Police misconduct § United States
- Police riot § United States
- Police use of deadly force in the United States
