= Beeston Hill =

Beeston Hill may refer to the following places:

- Beeston Hill, Leeds, an area of Leeds, West Yorkshire, England
- Beeston Hill, U.S. Virgin Islands, a settlement on the island of Saint Croix in the United States Virgin Islands
- Beeston Hill Y Station, a former secret listening station in Norfolk, England
