= Friedensfeld =

Friedensfeld may refer to:

- Friedensfeld, Manitoba, a settlement in Canada
- Friedensfeld West, Manitoba, a settlement in Canada
- Friedensfeld, United States Virgin Islands, a settlement on the island of Saint Croix
