= Libanon Hill, U.S. Virgin Islands =

Coordinates: 17°45′16″N 64°47′08″W

Libanon Hill, United States Virgin Islands
- Village
- Interactive map of Libanon Hill, United States Virgin Islands
- Country: United States Virgin Islands
- Island: Saint Croix
- Time zone: UTC-4 (AST)

Libanon Hill is a settlement on the island of Saint Croix in the United States Virgin Islands.

== History ==
Libanon Hill is a former sugar cane plantation. In 1856, it was acquired by Andreas Michael Dam for 25,000 dollars. Dam was the first of three brothers from the small Danish island of Christiansø who moved to St. Croix. He landed on the island in 1835 and spent many years managing the plantations Envy, Lower Love and Work and Rest. One of his younger brothers, Chrisitan Ulrik Dam, together with H, Kofoed, purchased Sprat Hall. Andreas Michael Dam died from dysentery in 1762. He had three children by two coloured women. Two of the children moved to Bornholm after the death of their father.
