= Bonne Esperance, United States Virgin Islands =

Bonne Esperance, United States Virgin Islands may refer to:

- Bonne Esperance, Saint Croix, United States Virgin Islands
- Bonne Esperance, Saint Thomas, United States Virgin Islands
