= Contant =

Contant is a surname. Notable people with the surname include:

- Alexis Contant (1858–1918), Canadian composer, organist, pianist, and music educator
- George Contant (1864–1930), American outlaw

== See also ==
- Contant, U.S. Virgin Islands
