= Parasol (disambiguation) =

A parasol is a type of umbrella used for protection from the sun.

Parasol may also refer to:

== Places ==
- Parasol, United States Virgin Islands, a settlement
- Ile Parasol (Parasol Island), British Indian Ocean Territory
- Parasol Rocks, near the island of Huevos, Trinidad and Tobago

== Arts, entertainment, and media ==
- Parasol (band), South Korean rock band
- Parasol (film), a 2015 Belgian film
- Parasol Records, a record label
- The Parasol, a cartoon series of paintings by Francisco Goya

== Aviation ==
- Parasol wing, a wing mounted above and away from an airplane fuselage
- Nieuport-Macchi Parasol, an Italian artillery observation aircraft of World War I
- REP Parasol, a French military reconnaissance aircraft of World War I
- Heath Parasol, an American parasol-winged, homebuilt monoplane first flown in 1926

== Biology ==
- Firmiana simplex, the Chinese parasol tree
- Flower pot parasol, a fungus
- Parasol mushroom, a fungus
- Shaggy parasol, a fungus
- Slender parasol, a fungus

== Other uses ==
- Battalion Parasol, a unit of the Polish Home Army
- Ruth Parasol (born 1967), founder of PartyGaming, the parent company of online poker site PartyPoker.com
- Parasol (horse), a Thoroughbred racehorse
- Parasol (satellite), a French-built Earth-observing research satellite
- Parasol, a roof or covering of a structure designed to provide cover from wind, rain, or sun

== See also ==
- Parasoul, a playable character in the 2D fighting game Skullgirls
