= Resolution, U.S. Virgin Islands =

Coordinates: 18°21′16″N 64°57′24″W

Bonne Resolution is a settlement on the island of Saint Thomas in the United States Virgin Islands. It is part of the Northside Administrative District. Crown Mountain, the highest point in the US Virgin Islands, is in Bonne Resolution.
