= Mafolie Great House =

- U.S. National Register of Historic Places
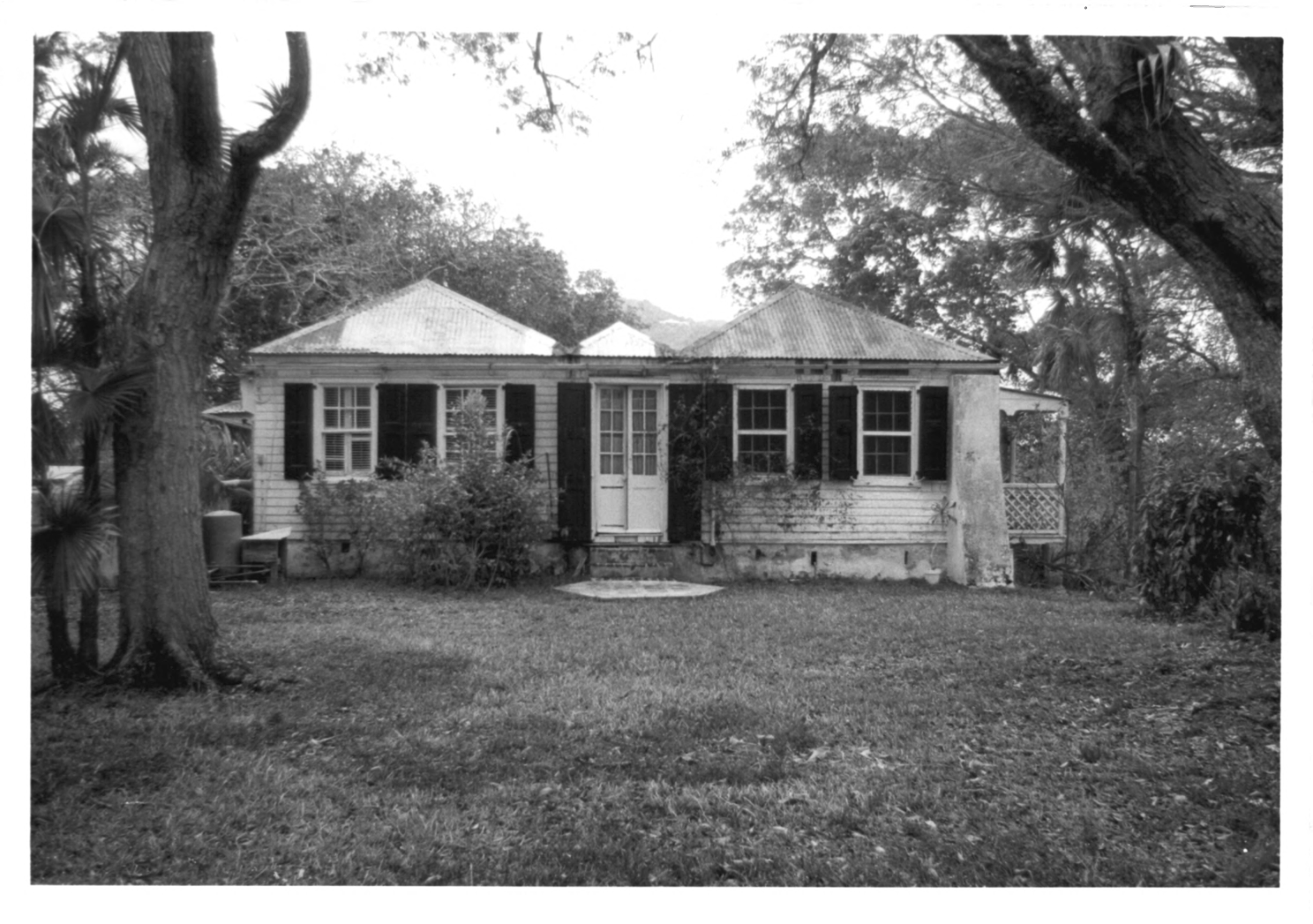
- Mafolie Great House

- Location within the U.S. Virgin Islands
- Location: North of Charlotte Amalie, Virgin Islands
- Coordinates: 18°21′13″N 64°55′42″W
- Area: 1.7 acres (0.69 ha)
- Built: 1795
- NRHP reference No.: 78002732
- Added to NRHP: February 17, 1978

The Mafolie Great House, in Mafolie in the Northside subdistrict north of Charlotte Amalie in St. Thomas, U.S. Virgin Islands, was built in 1795. The estate was originally part of Estate Catherineberg sugar plantation, but was sold to Captain Sonderburg in 1962. It was listed on the National Register of Historic Places in 1978. The listing included three contributing buildings and a contributing structure.

The name means "My folly" in French. The larger house is unusual in being composed of two parallel one-story structures joined by a roof.

The house was headquarters of a Brazilian astronomical expedition in 1882 which studied a transit of Venus. The area has been said to have "an excellent panoramic view".
