= Lovenlund, U.S. Virgin Islands =

Coordinates: 18°21′33″N 64°54′40″W

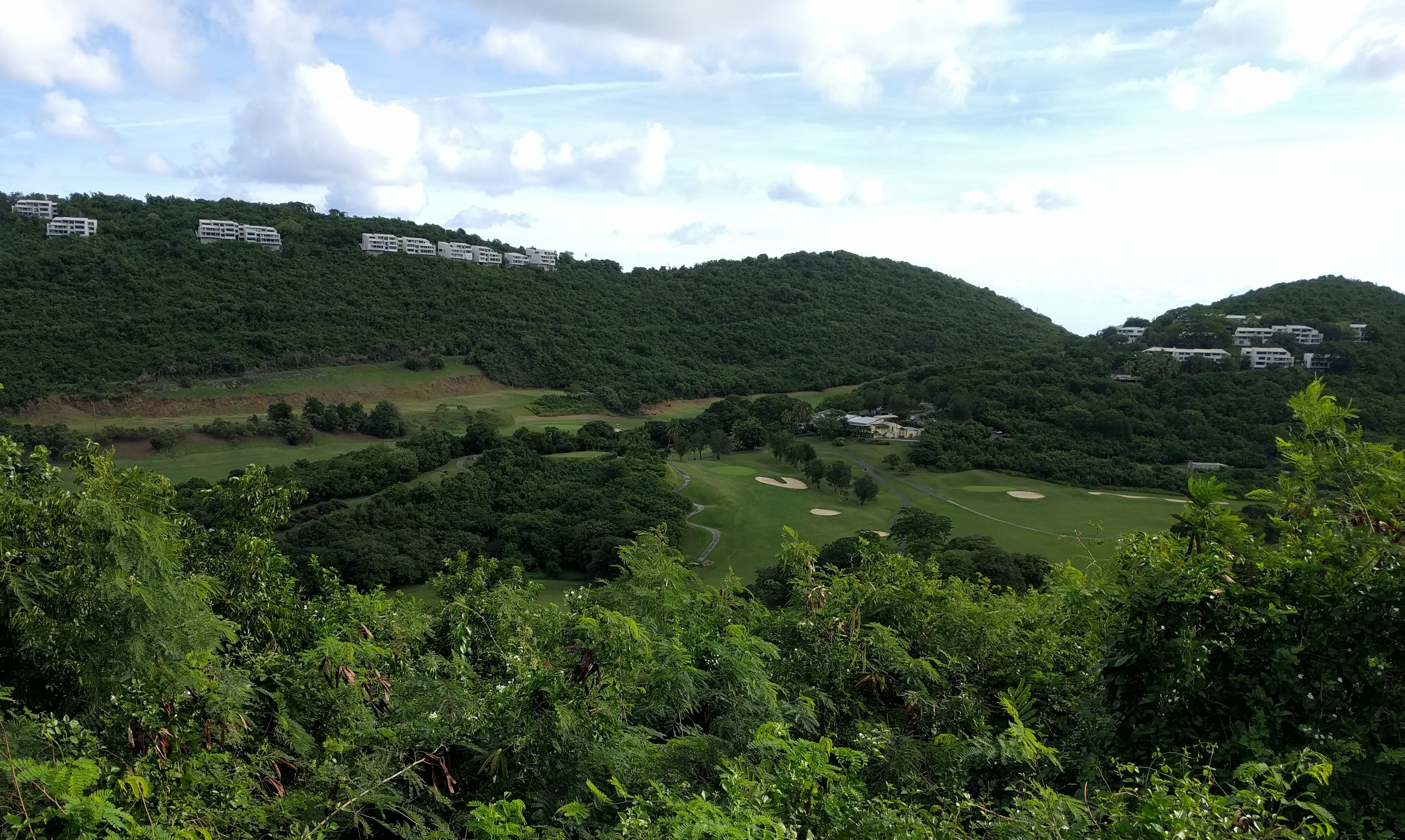
Mahogany Run Golf Course, Lovenlund, St. Thomas

Lovenlund is a settlement near Magens Bay on the Northside of the island of Saint Thomas in the United States Virgin Islands.

The Mahogany Run Golf Course is located in Lovenlund.

One site of historic importance in Lovenlund is the Old Stone Farm House Restaurant, which is housed in a restored farm building of the 300 acre Lovendahl plantation.
