= Bettys Hope, U.S. Virgin Islands =

Bettys Hope
- Village
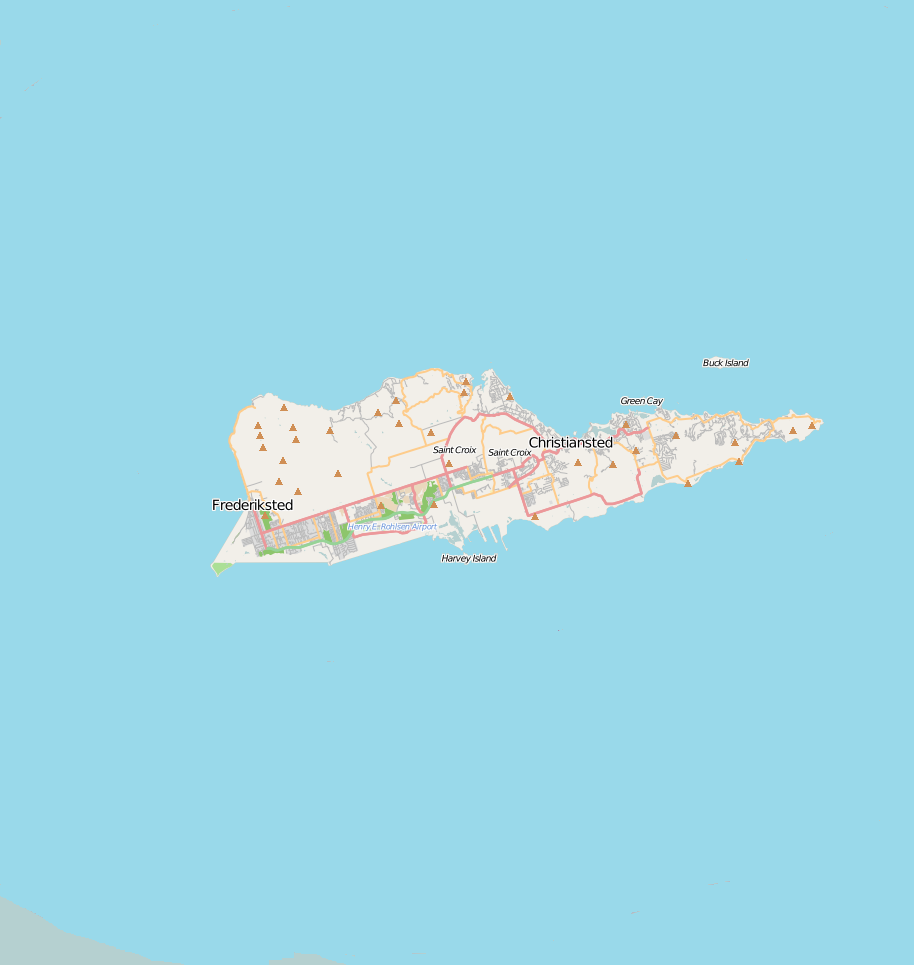
- Location in Saint Croix, United States Virgin Islands
- Coordinates: 17°41′32″N 64°49′0″W
- Country: United States Virgin Islands
- Island: Saint Croix
- Time zone: UTC-4 (AST)

Bettys Hope is a settlement on the island of Saint Croix in the United States Virgin Islands.

== History ==
Bettys Hope is a former sugarcane plantation. It was founded in 1750 by the Scottish planter Robert Stewart. He gradually increased the size of the plantation through the acquisition of more land to 182 hectares. The next owner of the plantation was Thomas Thompson. The plantation remained in the hands of his descendants for more than a hundred years.

In 1905, Bettys Hope and the adjacent Negro Bay (56 hectares) were sold at auction for 20,000 dollars to Niels Vilhelm Thornberg. Thornberg was born in Svaneke on the Danish island of Bornholm in 1869 as the son of a saddler. He moved to St. Croix in 1883. In 1901, he became manager of the plantation River. In 1908, he also purchased the plantation St. George's Hill. Most of the land was used for the cultivation of sugarcane. In 1907, he also began to grow cotton on part of the land. The production of sugar at Bettys Hope varied tremendously from year to year, peaking with 152,525 t in 1911 and reaching an all-time-low with 3.331 t in 1915. On 12 April 1918, Thornberg sold Bettys Hope to the West India Factory.
