= Sieben, U.S. Virgin Islands =

Coordinates: 18°19′51″N 64°45′37″W

Sieben is a former plantation on the island of Saint John in the United States Virgin Islands. Homes in this area are considered by the local government to be located in Remainder Fish Bay. The Sieben plantation ruins are accessible via the L'Esperance Trail. Most of this area is part of Virgin Islands National Park. The only baobab tree on St. John is near the Sieben ruins.
