= Betzys Jewell, U.S. Virgin Islands =

Betzys Jewell
- Village
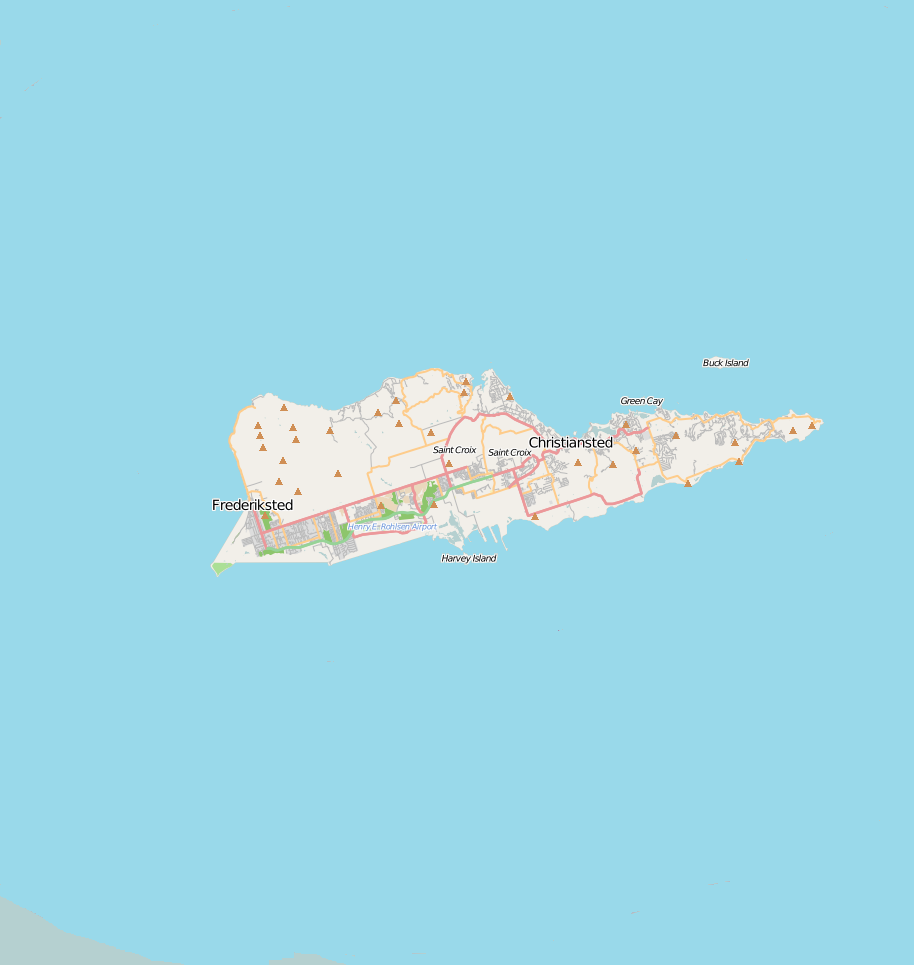
- Location in Saint Croix, United States Virgin Islands
- Coordinates: 17°45′34″N 64°47′45″W
- Country: United States Virgin Islands
- Island: Saint Croix
- Time zone: UTC-4 (AST)

Betzys Jewell is a settlement on the island of Saint Croix in the United States Virgin Islands.
