= Mariendal, U.S. Virgin Islands =

Mariendal
- Settlement
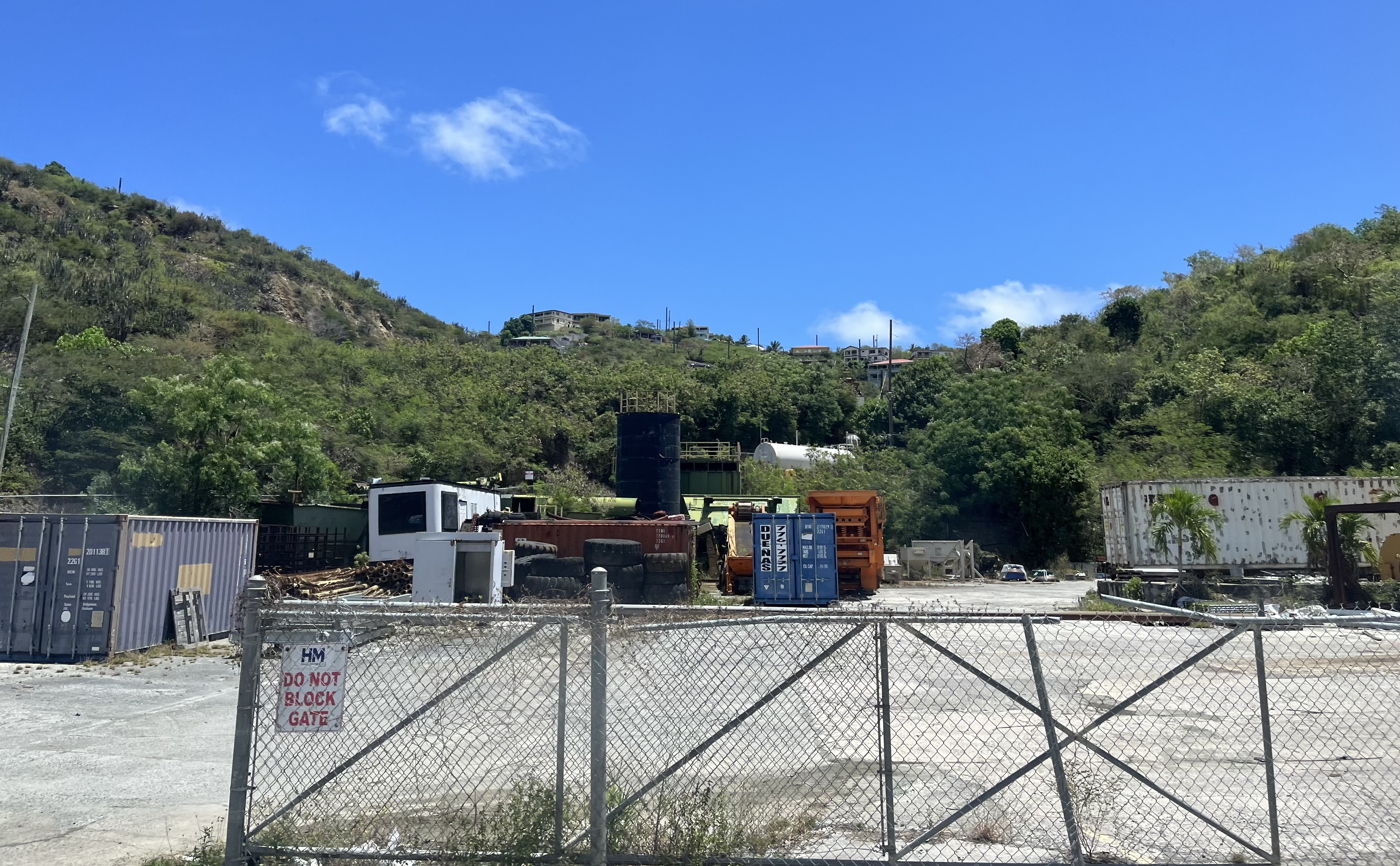
- Mariendal, U.S. Virgin Islands

- Location within the Caribbean
- Coordinates: 18°19′40″N 64°52′54″W
- Country: U.S. Virgin Islands
- Island: Saint Thomas

Mariendal is a settlement on the island of Saint Thomas in the United States Virgin Islands.
