= Lilliendahl, U.S. Virgin Islands =

Coordinates: 18°21′16″N 64°57′08″W

Lilliendahl is a settlement on the island of Saint Thomas in the United States Virgin Islands.
