= Windberg, U.S. Virgin Islands =

Settlement in the U.S. Virgin Islands

Coordinates: 18°21′25″N 64°44′25″W

Windberg is a settlement on the island of Saint John in the United States Virgin Islands.
