= Fort Christian, U.S. Virgin Islands =

Coordinates: 18°20′27″N 64°55′47″W

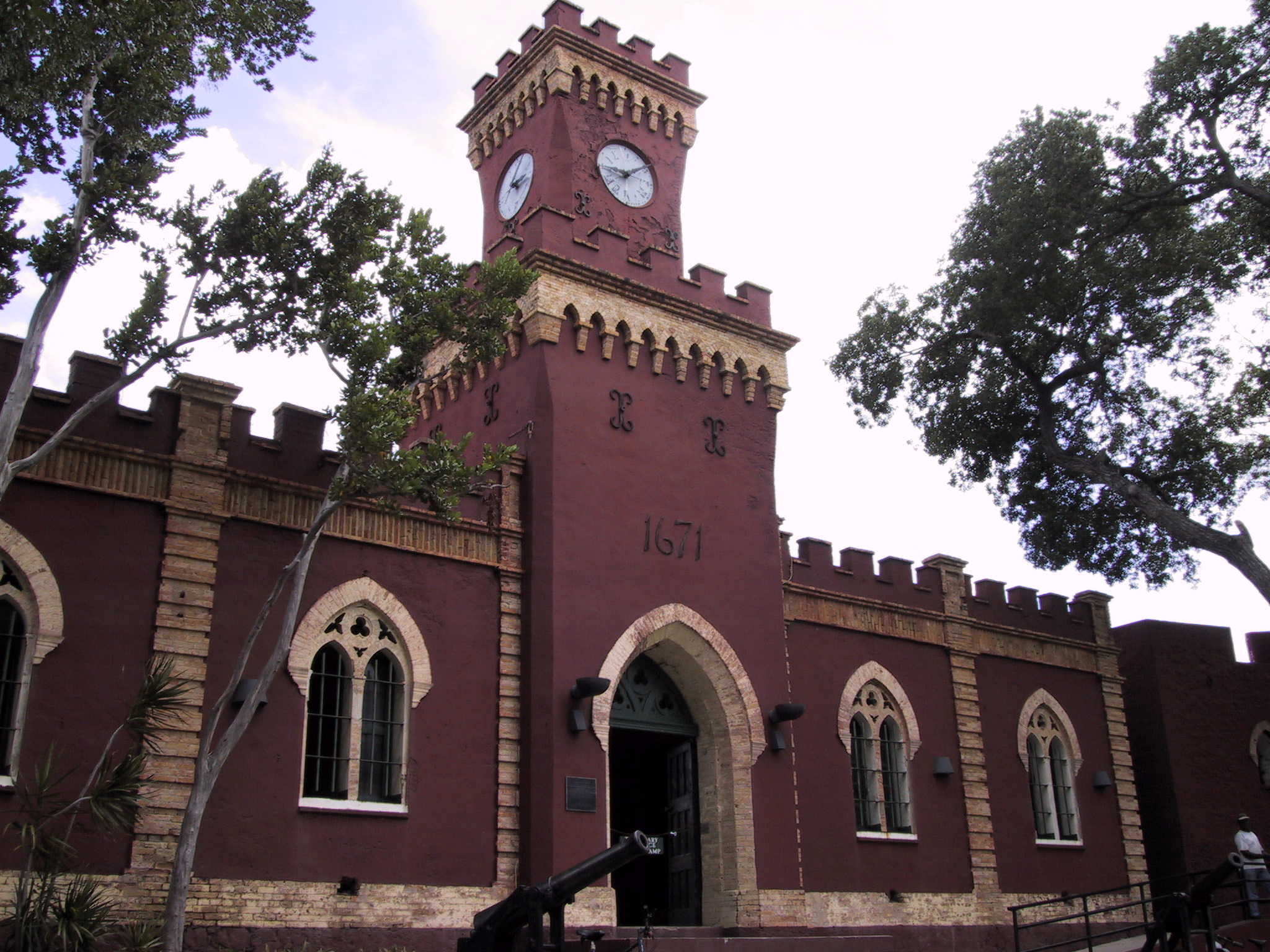
Fort Christian

Fort Christian is a settlement on the island of Saint Thomas in the United States Virgin Islands.
