= North Star, U.S. Virgin Islands =

Coordinates: 17°46′05″N 64°49′07″W

North Star, United States Virgin Islands
- Village
- Interactive map of North Star, United States Virgin Islands
- Country: United States Virgin Islands
- Island: Saint Croix
- Time zone: UTC-4 (AST)

North Star is a settlement on the island of Saint Croix in the United States - Virgin Islands.
