= Peterborg, U.S. Virgin Islands =

Coordinates: 18°22′18″N 64°55′32″W

Peterborg is a settlement and peninsula on the Northside of the island of Saint Thomas in the United States Virgin Islands. It overlooks Magens Bay to the southwest and the Atlantic Ocean to the northeast.

At the tip of Peterborg is Picara Point or Peterborg Point.
