= Little Fountain, U.S. Virgin Islands =

Coordinates: 17°45′06″N 64°47′38″W

Little Fountain, United States Virgin Islands
- Village
- Interactive map of Little Fountain, United States Virgin Islands
- Country: United States Virgin Islands
- Island: Saint Croix
- Time zone: UTC-4 (AST)

Little Fountain is a settlement on the island of Saint Croix in the United States Virgin Islands.
