= Springfield, U.S. Virgin Islands =

Coordinates: 17°43′52″N 64°49′56″W

Springfield, United States Virgin Islands
- Village
- Interactive map of Springfield, United States Virgin Islands
- Country: United States Virgin Islands
- Island: Saint Croix
- Time zone: UTC-4 (AST)

Springfield is a settlement on the island of Saint Croix in the United States Virgin Islands.
