= Slob Historic District =

- U.S. National Register of Historic Places
- Location within Saint Croix, U.S. Virgin Islands Location within the U.S. Virgin Islands
- Nearest city: Christiansted, Virgin Islands
- Coordinates: 17°43′54″N 64°46′16″W
- Area: 9 acres (3.6 ha)
- NRHP reference No.: 87001929
- Added to NRHP: November 12, 1987

Slob Historic District, near Christiansted, Virgin Islands, is a historic district which was listed on the National Register of Historic Places in 1987. The listing included nine contributing buildings, three contributing structures, and a contributing site on 9 acres (3.6 ha).

== History ==
It was a large sugar plantation, started in the mid-1700s and owned by the Bodkin family until 1784. The estate included a factory building, a water mill tower, a great house built around 1750, and a slave village. Slaves were emancipated in 1848, and the estate declined and was largely used for grazing sheep and cattle. In 1878, workers rioted over low wages and the plantation was burned.

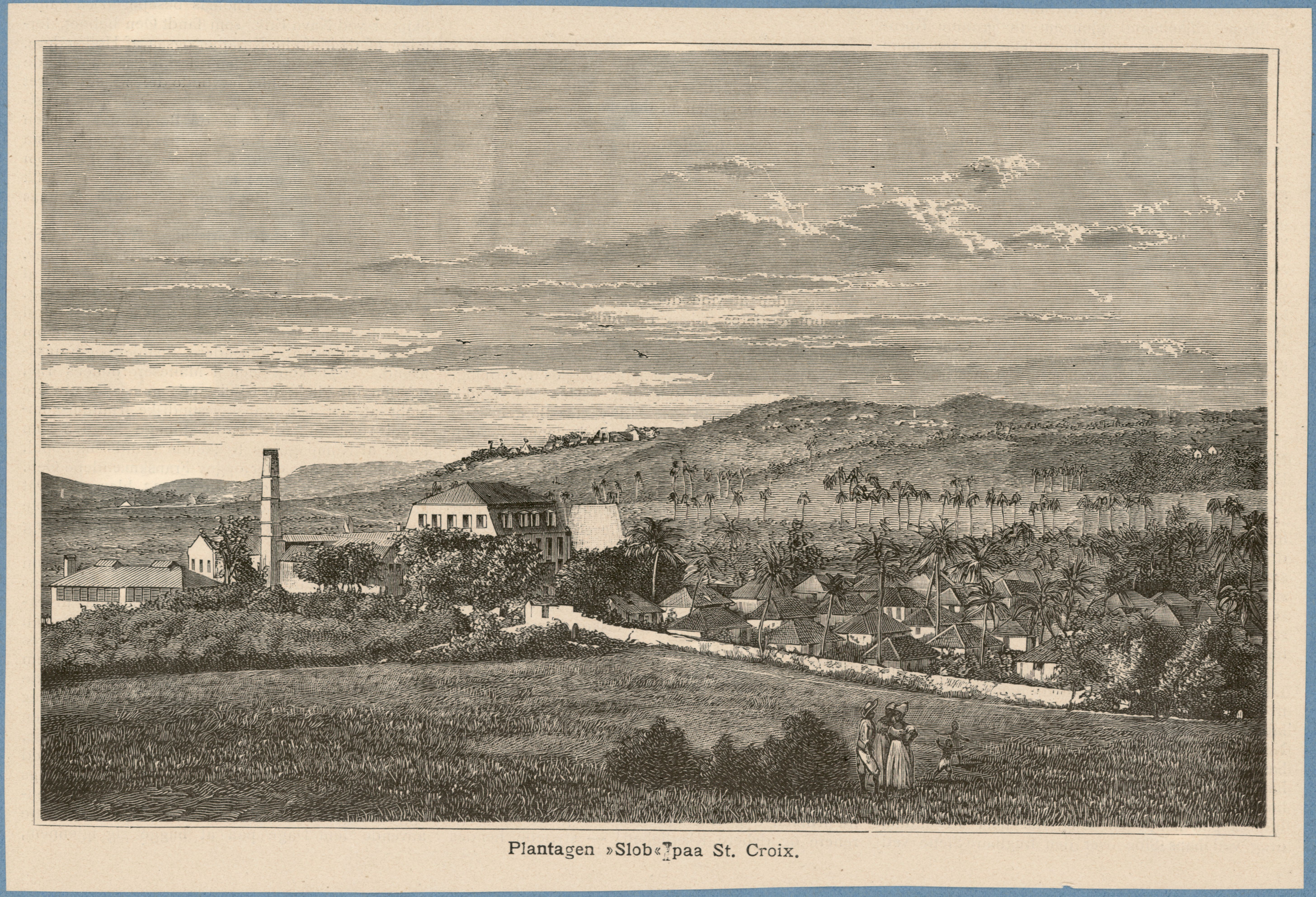
Slob in the second half of the 19th century.

It has also been known as Estate Slob, as Body Slob, and as Slob.

The slave village was the birthplace of Cyril King, the island of St. Croix's first native-born governor. The district also includes the stables and an 1840s factory building.

== Today ==
The Slob Historic District includes the Great House and five slave cottages from the late 1700s and two from the early 1800s in the slave village.

It is located north of Centerline Rd., about 6 miles (10 km) west of Christiansted, on the east side of a cemetery. (Note: About location: Both the NRHP document and the NPS webpage state, incorrectly, that the site is 6 miles west of Frederiksted. Frederiksted is on the western coast of St. Croix however and west of it is out at sea. Slob is in fact 6 miles west of Christiansted. Based on sketch map and description of location in the NRHP document, and Google maps identification of "Slob Historic District" (17.731119°N 64.779882°W), it is located on what Google Maps terms "Route 69", which runs north from Centerline Rd. (Route 69 may or may not be U.S. Virgin Islands Highway 69 (currently a redlink) in the highways listed at List of United States Virgin Islands highways.) According to OpenSource map, that would be VI 633 (so perhaps U.S. Virgin Islands Highway 663). Adjacent, to the west, is the north end of the large Kingshill Cemetery. The estate was visible from Centerline Rd. when the NRHP document was written, but is obscured by trees by 2016. The tower is directly on Route 69, on the east side of the road, at exactly 17.732101°N 64.779879°W as determined by Google Streetview to match photo in the NRHP document. The windmill ruin at top of hill in the estate appears to be the structure at exactly 17.731230°N 64.780115°W, which is visible in Google satellite view and is visible by Google Streetview from ground level in housing complex parking lot to the north. The Great House appears to be the structure at exactly 17.731012°N 64.780477°W. Google satellite view copyright 2019; Google Streetview imagery captured August 2016, both accessed November 21, 2019.)
