= Whites Bay, U.S. Virgin Islands =

Coordinates: 17°41′18″N 64°52′26″W

Whites Bay, United States Virgin Islands
- Village
- Interactive map of Whites Bay, United States Virgin Islands
- Country: United States Virgin Islands
- Island: Saint Croix
- Time zone: UTC-4 (AST)

Whites Bay is a settlement on the island of Saint Croix in the United States Virgin Islands.
