= Cotton Valley, U.S. Virgin Islands =

Coordinates: 17°45′02″N 64°37′12″W

Cotton Valley, United States Virgin Islands
- Village
- Interactive map of Cotton Valley, United States Virgin Islands
- Country: United States Virgin Islands
- Island: Saint Croix
- Time zone: UTC-4 (AST)

Cotton Valley is a settlement on the island of Saint Croix in the United States Virgin Islands.
