= Fredriksdal, U.S. Virgin Islands =

Coordinates: 18°21′35″N 64°44′10″W

Fredriksdal is an area of Virgin Islands National Park on the island of Saint John in the United States Virgin Islands.
