= Raphune, U.S. Virgin Islands =

Coordinates: 18°20′04″N 64°54′33″W

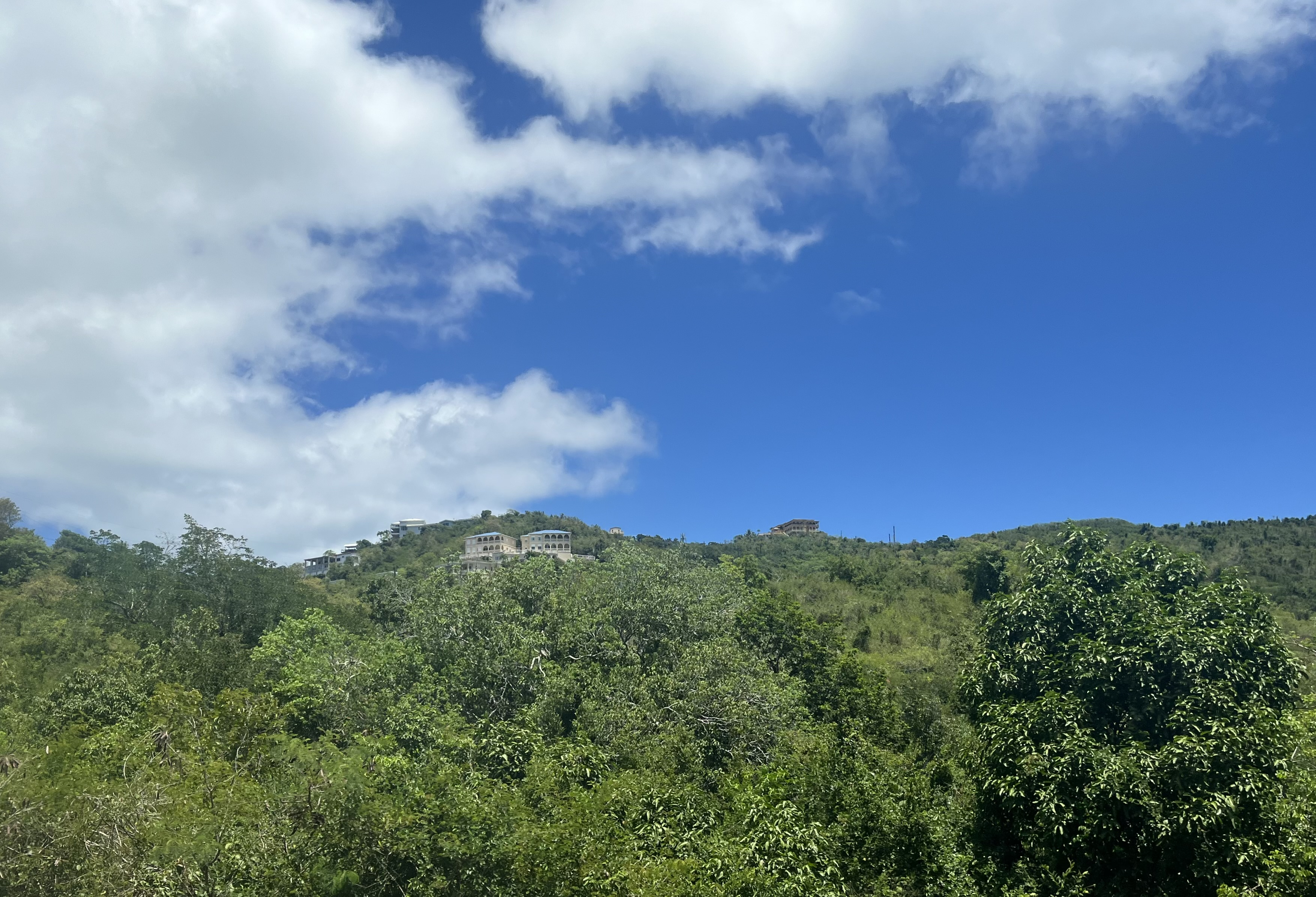
Raphune

Raphune is a settlement on the island of Saint Thomas in the United States Virgin Islands.

The Al Cohen's Plaza mall is located in Raphune.
