= North Side, U.S. Virgin Islands =

North Side, United States Virgin Islands
- Village
- Location within the U.S. Virgin Islands
- Coordinates: 17°45′31″N 64°53′18″W
- Country: United States Virgin Islands
- Island: Saint Croix
- Time zone: UTC-4 (AST)

North Side is a settlement on the island of Saint Croix in the United States Virgin Islands.
