= Monte, U.S. Virgin Islands =

Coordinates: 18°19′15″N 64°46′34″W

Monte is a neighborhood on the island of Saint John in the United States Virgin Islands. The local government calls this neighborhood Rendezvous and Ditleff.
