= Granard, U.S. Virgin Islands =

Coordinates: 17°42′47″N 64°42′57″W

Granard, United States Virgin Islands
- Village
- Interactive map of Granard, United States Virgin Islands
- Country: United States Virgin Islands
- Island: Saint Croix
- Time zone: UTC-4 (AST)

Granard is a settlement on the island of Saint Croix in the United States Virgin Islands.
