= Saint Peter, U.S. Virgin Islands =

Saint Peter, United States Virgin Islands
- Village
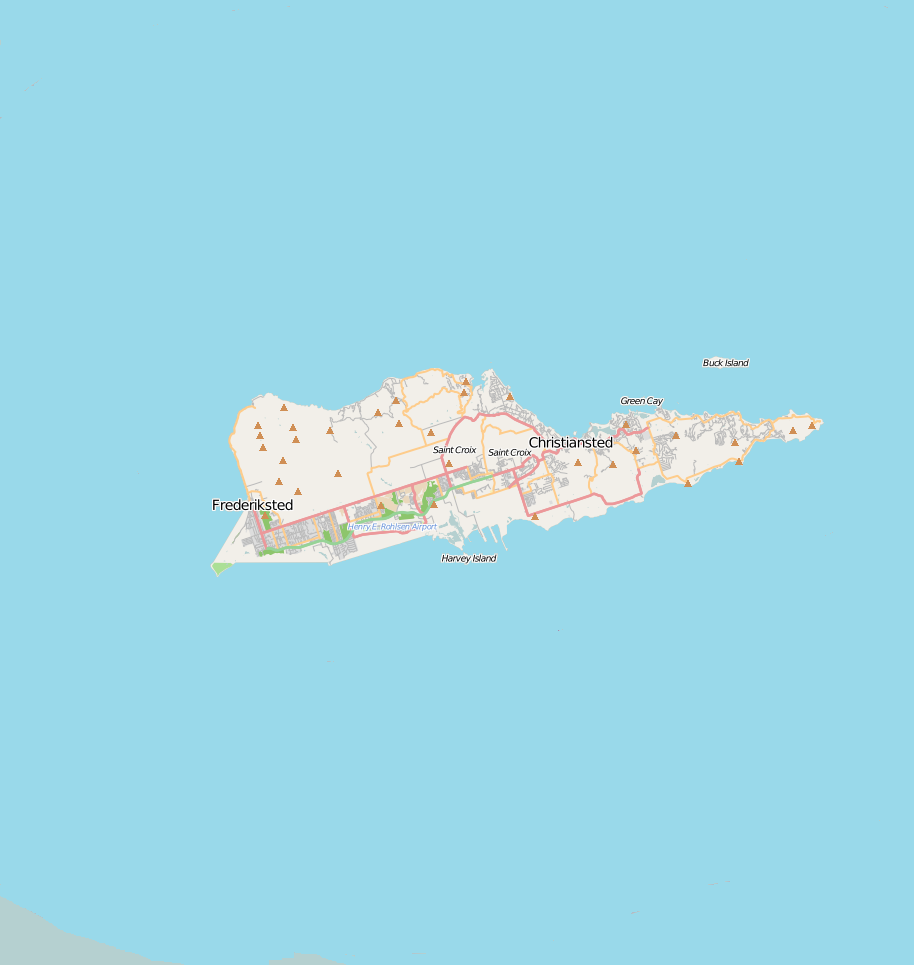
- Location in Saint Croix Location in US Virgin Islands
- Coordinates: 17°44′31″N 64°41′34″W
- Country: United States Virgin Islands
- Island: Saint Croix
- Time zone: UTC-4 (AST)

Saint Peter is a settlement on the island of Saint Croix in the United States Virgin Islands.
