= Nicholas, U.S. Virgin Islands =

Coordinates: 17°45′11″N 64°52′20″W

Nicholas, United States Virgin Islands
- Village
- Interactive map of Nicholas, United States Virgin Islands
- Country: United States Virgin Islands
- Island: Saint Croix
- Time zone: UTC-4 (AST)

Nicholas is a settlement on the island of Saint Croix in the United States Virgin Islands.
