= Saint John, Saint Croix, U.S. Virgin Islands =

Coordinates: 17.76358°N 64.74709°W

Saint John, Saint Croix, United States Virgin Islands
- Village
- Interactive map of Saint John, Saint Croix, United States Virgin Islands
- Country: United States Virgin Islands
- Island: Saint Croix
- Time zone: UTC-4 (AST)

Saint John, Saint Croix is a settlement on the island of Saint Croix in the United States Virgin Islands.
