= Solitude, U.S. Virgin Islands =

Coordinates: 17°45′22″N 64°37′53″W

Solitude, United States Virgin Islands
- Village
- Interactive map of Solitude, United States Virgin Islands
- Country: United States Virgin Islands
- Island: Saint Croix
- Time zone: UTC-4 (AST)

Solitude is a settlement on the island of Saint Croix in the United States Virgin Islands.
