= Cathrines Rest, U.S. Virgin Islands =

Coordinates: 17°43′21″N 64°42′56″W

Catherine’s Rest, United States Virgin Islands
- Village
- Interactive map of Catherine’s Rest, United States Virgin Islands
- Country: United States Virgin Islands
- Island: Saint Croix
- Time zone: UTC-4 (AST)

Catherine's Rest is a settlement on the island of Saint Croix in the United States Virgin Islands.
