= Spanish Town, U.S. Virgin Islands =

Coordinates: 17°43′02″N 64°46′23″W

Spanish Town, United States Virgin Islands
- Village
- Interactive map of Spanish Town, United States Virgin Islands
- Country: United States Virgin Islands
- Island: Saint Croix
- Time zone: UTC-4 (AST)

Spanish Town is a historic plantation location and settlement on the island of Saint Croix in the United States Virgin Islands. It is currently part of Renaissance Industrial Park and Port. The property is bisected by the U.S. Virgin Islands Highway 66 Melvin Evan's Highway.To the north is the location of a solar array which is colocated with a sheep farm. Spanish Town also has a foot race track on the south.
