= Caret Bay Estate, U.S. Virgin Islands =

Settlement in Saint Thomas, U.S. Virgin Islands

Coordinates: 18°21′50″N 64°58′34″W

Caret Bay Estate is a settlement on the island of Saint Thomas in the United States Virgin Islands.
