= Southgate, U.S. Virgin Islands =

Coordinates: 17°45′28″N 64°36′03″W

Southgate, United States Virgin Islands
- Village
- Interactive map of Southgate, United States Virgin Islands
- Country: United States Virgin Islands
- Island: Saint Croix
- Time zone: UTC-4 (AST)

Southgate is a settlement on the island of Saint Croix in the United States Virgin Islands.
