= Butzberg, U.S. Virgin Islands =

Coordinates: 17°44′48″N 64°40′39″W

Boetzberg or Butzberg, United States Virgin Islands
- Estate designation or Village
- Interactive map of Boetzberg or Butzberg, United States Virgin Islands
- Country: United States Virgin Islands
- Island: Saint Croix
- Time zone: UTC-4 (AST)

Boetzberg or Butzberg is an estate division or settlement on the island of Saint Croix in the United States Virgin Islands.
