= Cane Valley, U.S. Virgin Islands =

Village on the island of Saint Croix

Coordinates: 17°43′10″N 64°50′48″W

Cane Valley, United States Virgin Islands
- Village
- Interactive map of Cane Valley, United States Virgin Islands
- Country: United States Virgin Islands
- Island: Saint Croix
- Time zone: UTC-4 (AST)

Cane Valley is a settlement on the island of Saint Croix in the United States Virgin Islands.
