= Donoe, U.S. Virgin Islands =

Coordinates: 18°20′12″N 64°53′52″W

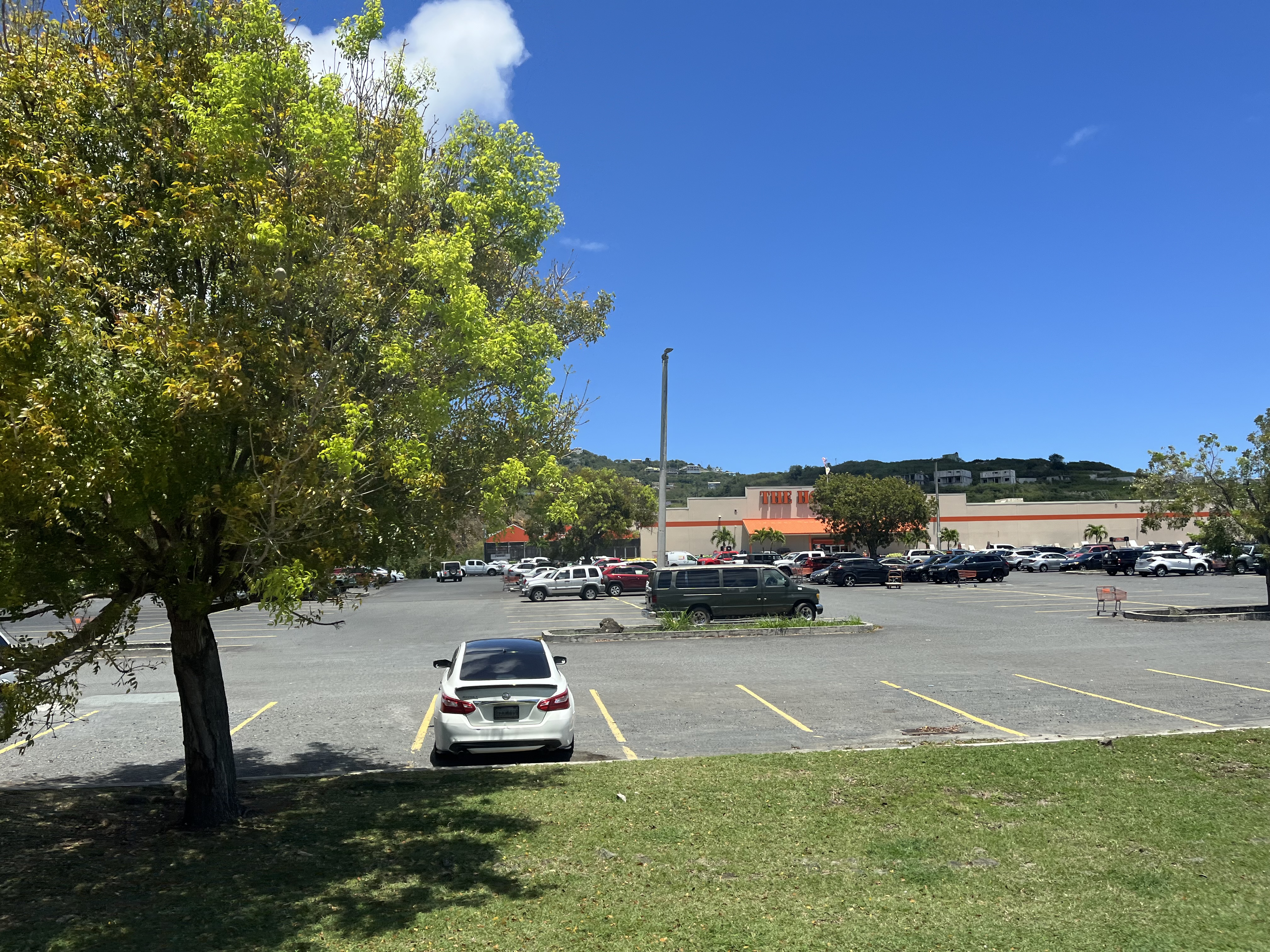
Donoe

Donoe is a settlement on the island of Saint Thomas in the United States Virgin Islands.

The Home Depot is located in Donoe.
