= Mollendal, U.S. Virgin Islands =

Place in United States Virgin Islands, United States of America

Coordinates: 18°19′45″N 64°45′05″W

Mollendal is an uninhabited part of Virgin Islands National Park on the island of Saint John in the United States Virgin Islands. The L'Esperance Trail passes through this area. Its elevation is 140 meters.
