= Santa Maria Estate, U.S. Virgin Islands =

Settlement in Saint Thomas, U.S. Virgin Islands

Coordinates: 18°21′31″N 64°58′42″W

Santa Maria Estate is a settlement on the island of Saint Thomas in the United States Virgin Islands.
