= Canebay, U.S. Virgin Islands =

Coordinates: 17°46′18″N 64°48′37″W

Canebay, United States Virgin Islands
- Village
- Interactive map of Canebay, United States Virgin Islands
- Country: United States Virgin Islands
- Island: Saint Croix
- Time zone: UTC-4 (AST)

Canebay is a settlement on the island of Saint Croix in the United States Virgin Islands.
