= Two Brothers, U.S. Virgin Islands =

Coordinates: 17°42′23″N 64°52′46″W

Two Brothers, United States Virgin Islands
- Village
- Interactive map of Two Brothers, United States Virgin Islands
- Country: United States Virgin Islands
- Island: Saint Croix
- Time zone: UTC-4 (AST)

Two Brothers is a settlement on the island of Saint Croix in the United States Virgin Islands.
