= Ruan Bay, U.S. Virgin Islands =

Coordinates: 17°41′30″N 64°50′36″W

Ruan Bay, United States Virgin Islands
- Village
- Interactive map of Ruan Bay, United States Virgin Islands
- Country: United States Virgin Islands
- Island: Saint Croix
- Time zone: UTC-4 (AST)

Ruan Bay is a settlement adjacent to Frederiksted on the island of Saint Croix in the United States Virgin Islands. Its US Postal Service zip code is 00840.
