= Bugbyhole, U.S. Virgin Islands =

Bugbyhole
- Village
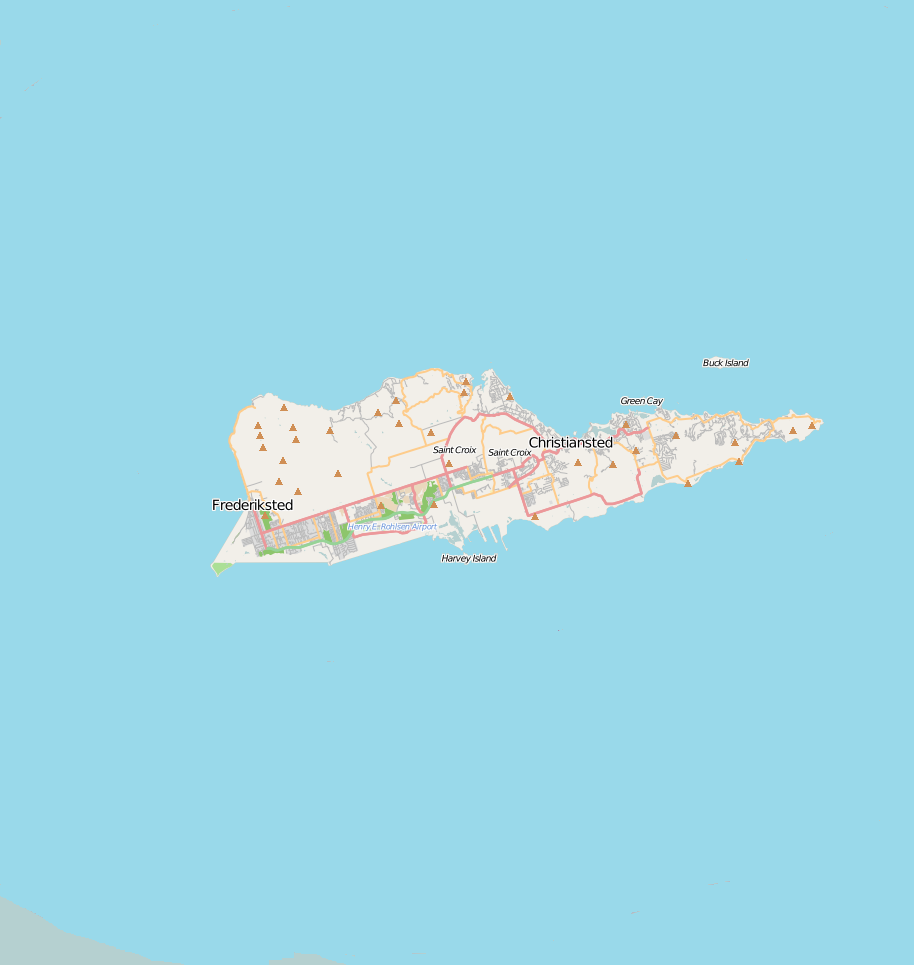
- Location in Saint Croix, United States Virgin Islands
- Coordinates: 17°43′33″N 64°42′15″W
- Country: United States Virgin Islands
- Island: Saint Croix
- Time zone: UTC-4 (AST)

Bugbyhole is a settlement on the island of Saint Croix in the United States Virgin Islands.
