= Solberg, U.S. Virgin Islands =

Coordinates: 18°20′51″N 64°56′31″W

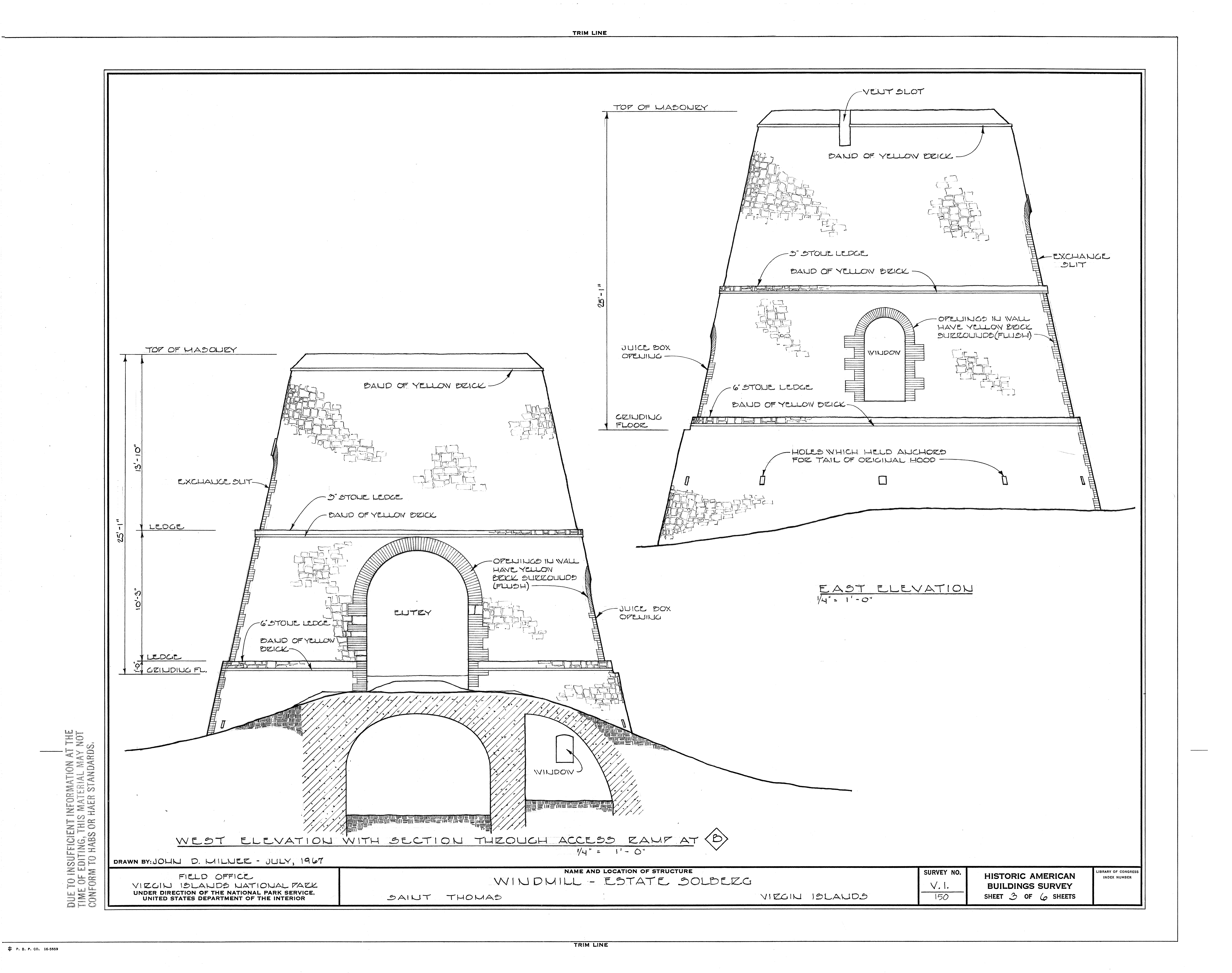
Estate Solberg Windmill

Solberg is a settlement on the Northside of the island of Saint Thomas in the United States Virgin Islands.

The remains of the old sugar estate's 18th century windmill remain in Solberg.

Mountain Top, a shopping center best known for its banana daiquiris and views of the island is located in Solberg.
