= Mon Bijou, U.S. Virgin Islands =

Coordinates: 17°44′54″N 64°47′20″W

Mon Bijou, United States Virgin Islands
- Village
- Interactive map of Mon Bijou, United States Virgin Islands
- Country: United States Virgin Islands
- Island: Saint Croix
- Time zone: UTC-4 (AST)

Mon Bijou is a settlement on the island of Saint Croix in the United States Virgin Islands.
