= Ruby, U.S. Virgin Islands =

Coordinates: 17°44′13″N 64°45′18″W

Ruby, United States Virgin Islands
- Village
- Interactive map of Ruby, United States Virgin Islands
- Country: United States Virgin Islands
- Island: Saint Croix
- Time zone: UTC-4 (AST)

Ruby is a settlement on the island of Saint Croix in the United States Virgin Islands.
