= Pearl, U.S. Virgin Islands =

Coordinates: 17°42′59″N 64°44′02″W

Pearl, United States Virgin Islands
- Village
- Interactive map of Pearl, United States Virgin Islands
- Country: United States Virgin Islands
- Island: Saint Croix
- Time zone: UTC-4 (AST)

Pearl is a settlement on the island of Saint Croix in the United States Virgin Islands.

== History ==
Pearl is a former sugar plantation. It was for a while owned by the Danish industrialist Holger Petersen. He also owned theplantations Castle Cockley and Cassavagarden .

== Sources ==
- U.S. Geological Survey Geographic Names Information System: Pearl, U.S. Virgin Islands
