= Rosendal, U.S. Virgin Islands =

Coordinates: 18°21′08″N 64°54′44″W

Rosendal is a settlement on the island of Saint Thomas in the United States Virgin Islands.
