= Profit, U.S. Virgin Islands =

Coordinates: 17°43′02″N 64°46′50″W

Profit, United States Virgin Islands Profit, USVI
- Village
- Interactive map of Profit, United States Virgin Islands
- Country: United States Virgin Islands
- Island: Saint Croix
- Time zone: UTC-4 (AST)

Profit is a settlement on the island of Saint Croix in the United States Virgin Islands.
