= Hams Bay, U.S. Virgin Islands =

Coordinates: 17°45′56″N 64°52′51″W

Hams Bay, United States Virgin Islands
- Village
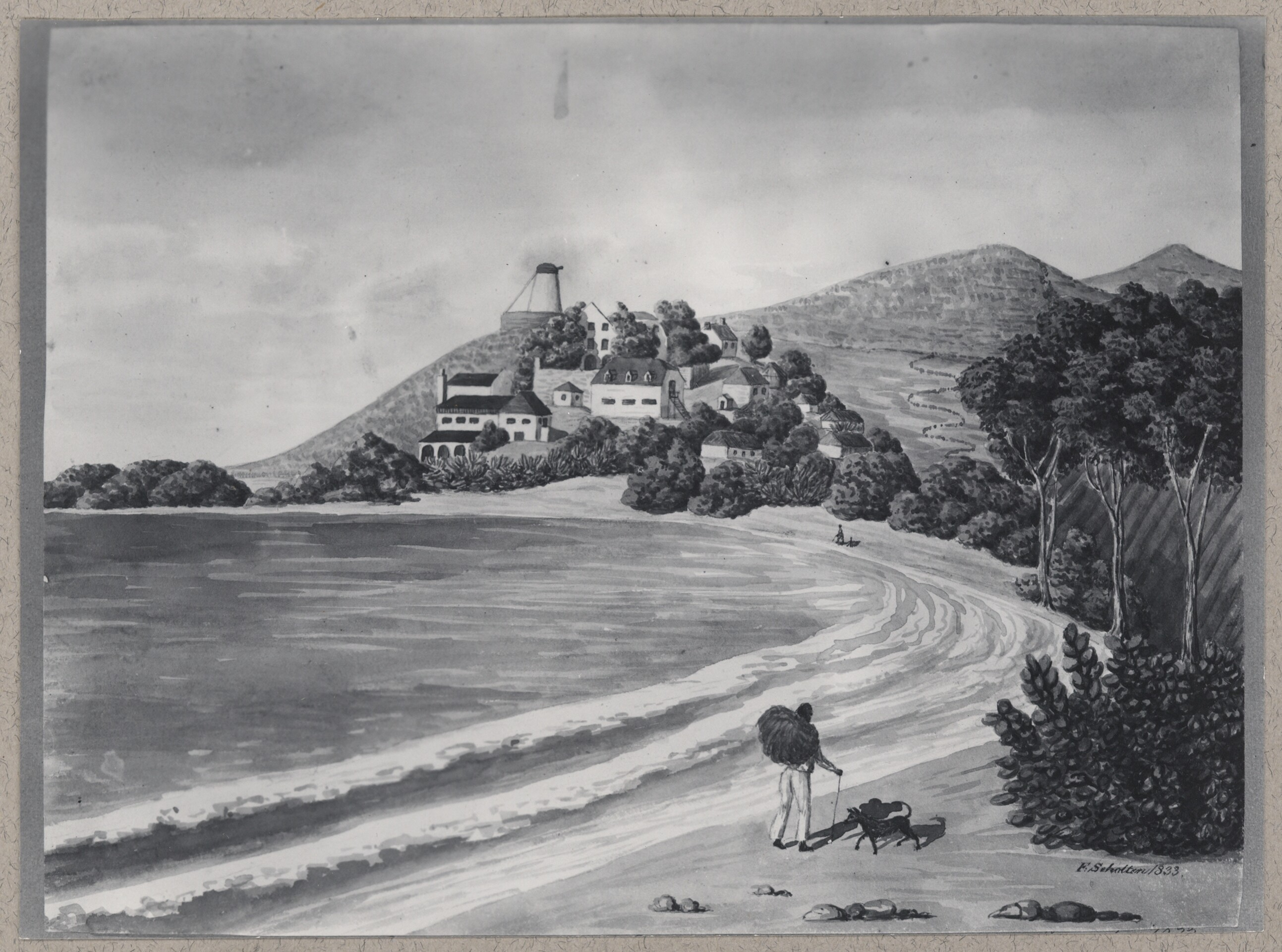
- Hams Bay depicted by Frederik von Scholten in November 1833
- Interactive map of Hams Bay, United States Virgin Islands
- Country: United States Virgin Islands
- Island: Saint Croix
- Time zone: UTC-4 (AST)

Hams Bay is a settlement on the island of Saint Croix in the United States Virgin Islands.
