= Orangegrove, U.S. Virgin Islands =

Coordinates: 17°44′14″N 64°51′08″W

Orangegrove, United States Virgin Islands
- Village
- Interactive map of Orangegrove, United States Virgin Islands
- Country: United States Virgin Islands
- Island: Saint Croix
- Time zone: UTC-4 (AST)

Orangegrove is a settlement on the island of Saint Croix in the United States Virgin Islands.
