= Windsor, U.S. Virgin Islands =

Coordinates: 17°45′31″N 64°46′26″W

Windsor, United States Virgin Islands
- Village
- Interactive map of Windsor, United States Virgin Islands
- Country: United States Virgin Islands
- Island: Saint Croix
- Time zone: UTC-4 (AST)

Windsor is a settlement on the island of Saint Croix in the United States Virgin Islands.
