= Jolly Hill, U.S. Virgin Islands =

Coordinates: 17°43′56″N 64°51′41″W

Jolly Hill
- Village
- Interactive map of Jolly Hill
- Country: United States Virgin Islands
- Island: Saint Croix
- Time zone: UTC-4 (AST)

Jolly Hill is a settlement on the island of Saint Croix in the United States Virgin Islands.
