= Pearson Gardens, U.S. Virgin Islands =

Coordinates: 18°20′25″N 64°55′06″W

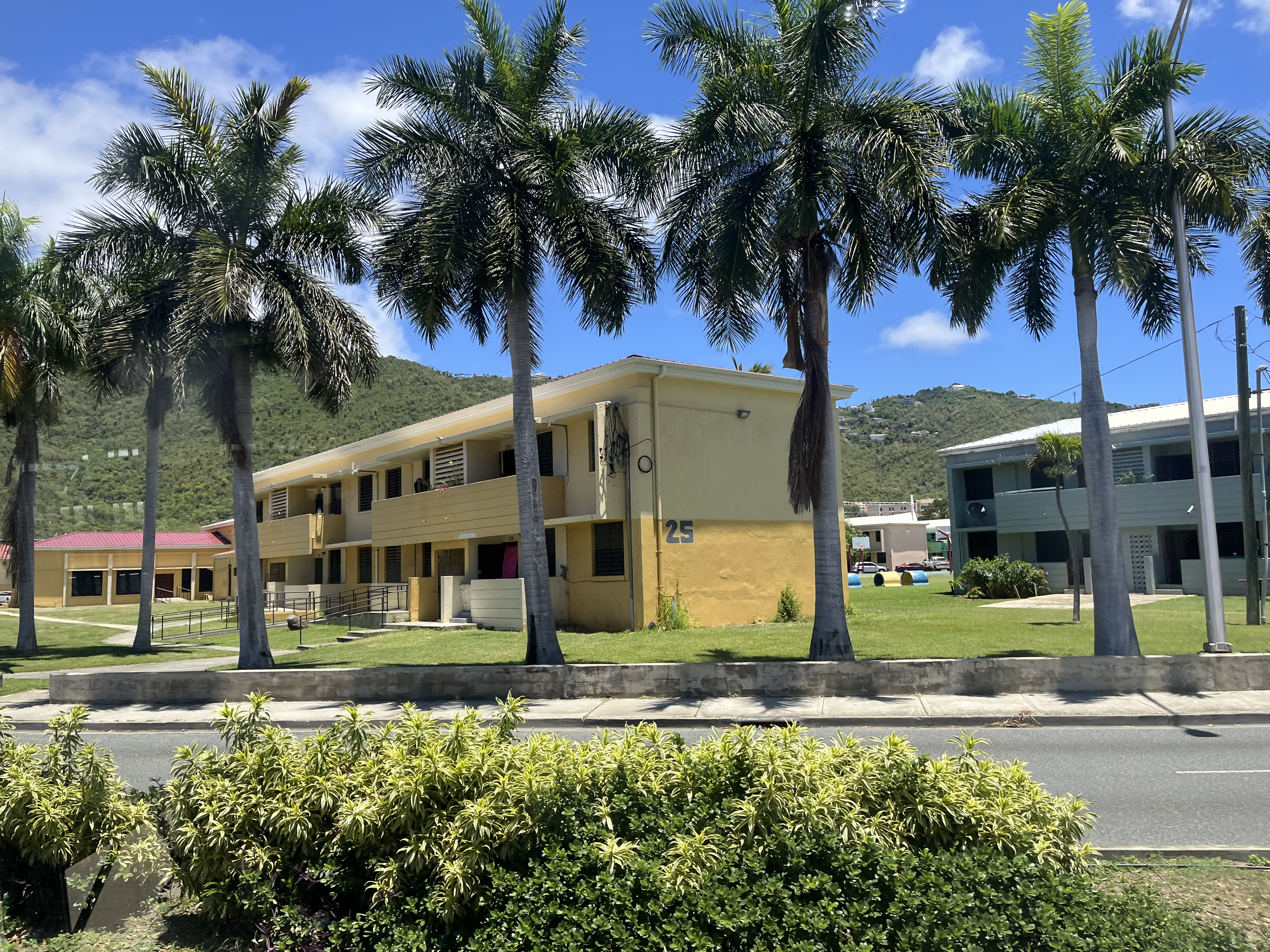
Pearson Gardens

Pearson Gardens is a public housing community on the island of Saint Thomas in the United States Virgin Islands.

It is managed by the Virgin Islands Housing Authority (VIHA), which is responsible for providing affordable housing options to low-income families and individuals in the USVI.

The community consists of a total of 202 apartments and townhouses, which are spread across 30 buildings. To answer your question, the Paul M. Pearson Gardens housing community in St. Thomas, USVI, consists of a total of 30 buildings and 240 living units. Fifteen of these buildings are part of the Paul M. Pearson Gardens Cooperative, which is a type of affordable housing model where residents own a share in the cooperative and participate in the decision-making process of the community.

The cooperative model allows residents to have more control over their housing and community and can be a more affordable option compared to traditional homeownership. In the case of Paul M. Pearson Gardens, the cooperative is managed by the residents and overseen by the Virgin Islands Housing Authority. The other 15 buildings in the community are part of the traditional public housing model, where residents pay subsidized rent to VIHA. The units are designed to provide affordable housing options to families of various sizes, and they range from one to four bedrooms. The community also features several amenities, including a community center, a playground, and an outdoor basketball court.

Paul M. Pearson Gardens is named after Paul M. Pearson, who was a former executive director of VIHA. The community was developed in the early 1980s and has since provided affordable housing options to many low-income families and individuals in the St. Thomas district of the USVI.
