= Laprey Valley, U.S. Virgin Islands =

Coordinates: 17°43′35″N 64°41′11″W

Laprey Valley, United States Virgin Islands
- Village
- Interactive map of Laprey Valley, United States Virgin Islands
- Country: United States Virgin Islands
- Island: Saint Croix
- Time zone: UTC-4 (AST)

Laprey Valley is a settlement on the island of Saint Croix in the United States Virgin Islands.
