= Richmond, U.S. Virgin Islands =

Coordinates: 17°44′43″N 64°42′58″W

Richmond, United States Virgin Islands
- Village
- Interactive map of Richmond, United States Virgin Islands
- Country: United States Virgin Islands
- Island: Saint Croix
- Time zone: UTC-4 (AST)

Richmond is a settlement on the island of Saint Croix in the United States Virgin Islands.
