= Madame Carty, U.S. Virgin Islands =

Coordinates: 17°44′10″N 64°37′02″W

Madame Carty, United States Virgin Islands
- Village
- Interactive map of Madame Carty, United States Virgin Islands
- Country: United States Virgin Islands
- Island: Saint Croix
- Time zone: UTC-4 (AST)

Madame Carty is a settlement on the island of Saint Croix in the United States Virgin Islands.
