= Fredensdal, U.S. Virgin Islands =

Coordinates: 17°44′24″N 64°42′44″W

Fredensdal, United States Virgin Islands
- Village
- Interactive map of Fredensdal, United States Virgin Islands
- Country: United States Virgin Islands
- Island: Saint Croix
- Time zone: UTC-4 (AST)

Fredensdal is a settlement on the island of Saint Croix in the United States Virgin Islands.
