= Lowrys Hill, U.S. Virgin Islands =

Coordinates: 17°44′21″N 64°40′21″W

Lowrys Hill, United States Virgin Islands
- Village
- Interactive map of Lowrys Hill, United States Virgin Islands
- Country: United States Virgin Islands
- Island: Saint Croix
- Time zone: UTC-4 (AST)

Lowrys Hill is a settlement on the island of Saint Croix in the United States Virgin Islands.
