= Calabash, U.S. Virgin Islands =

Neighbourhood in the United States Virgin Islands

Coordinates: 18.327733°N 64.703192°W

Calabash (locally known as Calabash Boom) is a neighborhood on the island of St. John in the United States Virgin Islands. It is located in the east of the island on the coast of Coral Bay, to the south of the town of Coral Bay.
