= Carden, U.S. Virgin Islands =

Coordinates: 17°45′32″N 64°38′27″W

Carden, United States Virgin Islands
- Village
- Interactive map of Carden, United States Virgin Islands
- Country: United States Virgin Islands
- Island: Saint Croix
- Time zone: UTC-4 (AST)

Carden is a settlement on the island of Saint Croix in the United States Virgin Islands.
