= Bulows Minde, U.S. Virgin Islands =

Coordinates: 17°44′25″N 64°43′42″W

Bulows Minde, United States Virgin Islands
- Village
- Interactive map of Bulows Minde, United States Virgin Islands
- Country: United States Virgin Islands
- Island: Saint Croix
- Time zone: UTC-4 (AST)

Bulows Minde is a settlement on the island of Saint Croix in the United States Virgin Islands.
