= Waldberggaard, U.S. Virgin Islands =

Coordinates: 17°43′00″N 64°50′40″W

Waldberggaard, United States Virgin Islands
- Village
- Interactive map of Waldberggaard, United States Virgin Islands
- Country: United States Virgin Islands
- Island: Saint Croix
- Time zone: UTC-4 (AST)

Waldberggaard is a settlement on the island of Saint Croix in the United States Virgin Islands.

== History ==
=== 18th century ===
Waldberggaard was originally the name of a sugar plantation. By 1750, sugar cane was being processed by an animal mill on the estate. On Beck's map of Saint Croix, ownership of Waldberggaard is attributed to Engelbert Hesselberg. He remained the owner until at least 1791.

=== 19th century ===
In 1816, Waidberggaard (Princes Quarter No. 24, Centre Police District, Frederiksteds Jurisdiction) covered 150 acres of land of which 1816 acres were planted with sugar cane and 30 acres were under other cultivation. 78 enslaved labourers were present on the estate.

On 9 March 1833, Waldberggaard was sold to J. Prætorius & Sons (Hesselberg included) for Rbd. 30,000. On 21 January 1836, it was sol by Prætorius & sons to Jonathan Sarginson (Hesselberg included) for Ps. 26,091. On 16 July 1838, ot was sold by Jonathan Sarginson to John Hewitson and Thomas Ivinson, for Ps. 27,812. On 27 October 1843, it was sold by John Hewitson and Thomas Ivinson to Chamberlain F. v. Oxholm for Ps. 18,000. On 10 September 1852, it was sold by auction to Chamberlain F. v. Oxholm (St. Georges, Sallysfancy, Hope and Mint & Mountain included) for $74.650.
