= Ensomned, U.S. Virgin Islands =

Settlement on US Virgin Islands

Coordinates: 18°22′05″N 64°57′09″W

Ensomned is a settlement on the island of Saint Thomas in the United States Virgin Islands.
