= John Oley, U.S. Virgin Islands =

Coordinates: 18°21′35″N 64°59′50″W

John Oley is a settlement on the island of Saint Thomas in the United States Virgin Islands. Its elevation is 99 meters (325 feet). Its census code is 49800. Its population density is 26 people per square kilometer.
