= Estate Thomas, U.S. Virgin Islands =

Settlement in United States Virgin Islands

Coordinates: 18°20′23″N 64°54′40″W

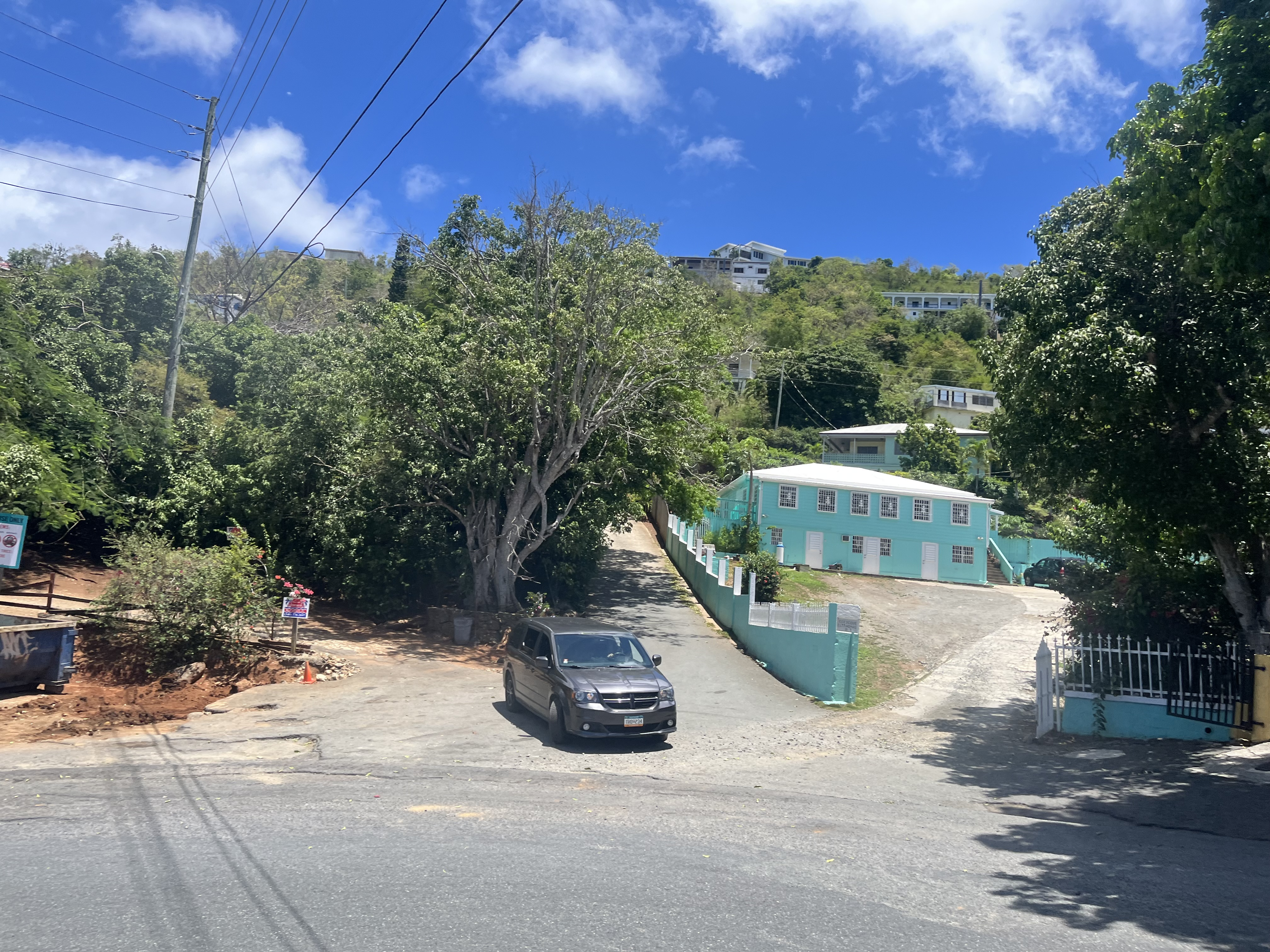
Estate Thomas

Estate Thomas is a settlement adjacent to Charlotte Amalie on the island of Saint Thomas in the United States Virgin Islands.

The WICO dock and Havensight, Charlotte Amalie High School, Sugar Estate Post Office, Wheatley Center, Pueblo Long Bay, Roy Lester Schneider Hospital, and Kimelman Cancer Institute are located in Estate Thomas.

There are also visible estate ruins in Estate Thomas.
