= Lerkenlund, U.S. Virgin Islands =

Coordinates: 18°21′37″N 64°56′25″W

Lerkenlund is a settlement on the island of Saint Thomas in the United States Virgin Islands.
