= Fish Bay, U.S. Virgin Islands =

Coordinates: 18°19′20″N 64°45′58″W

Fish Bay is a bay and neighborhood on the island of Saint John in the United States Virgin Islands. Most of this area is part of Virgin Islands National Park.
