= Louisenhoj, U.S. Virgin Islands =

Coordinates: 18°21′04″N 64°55′30″W

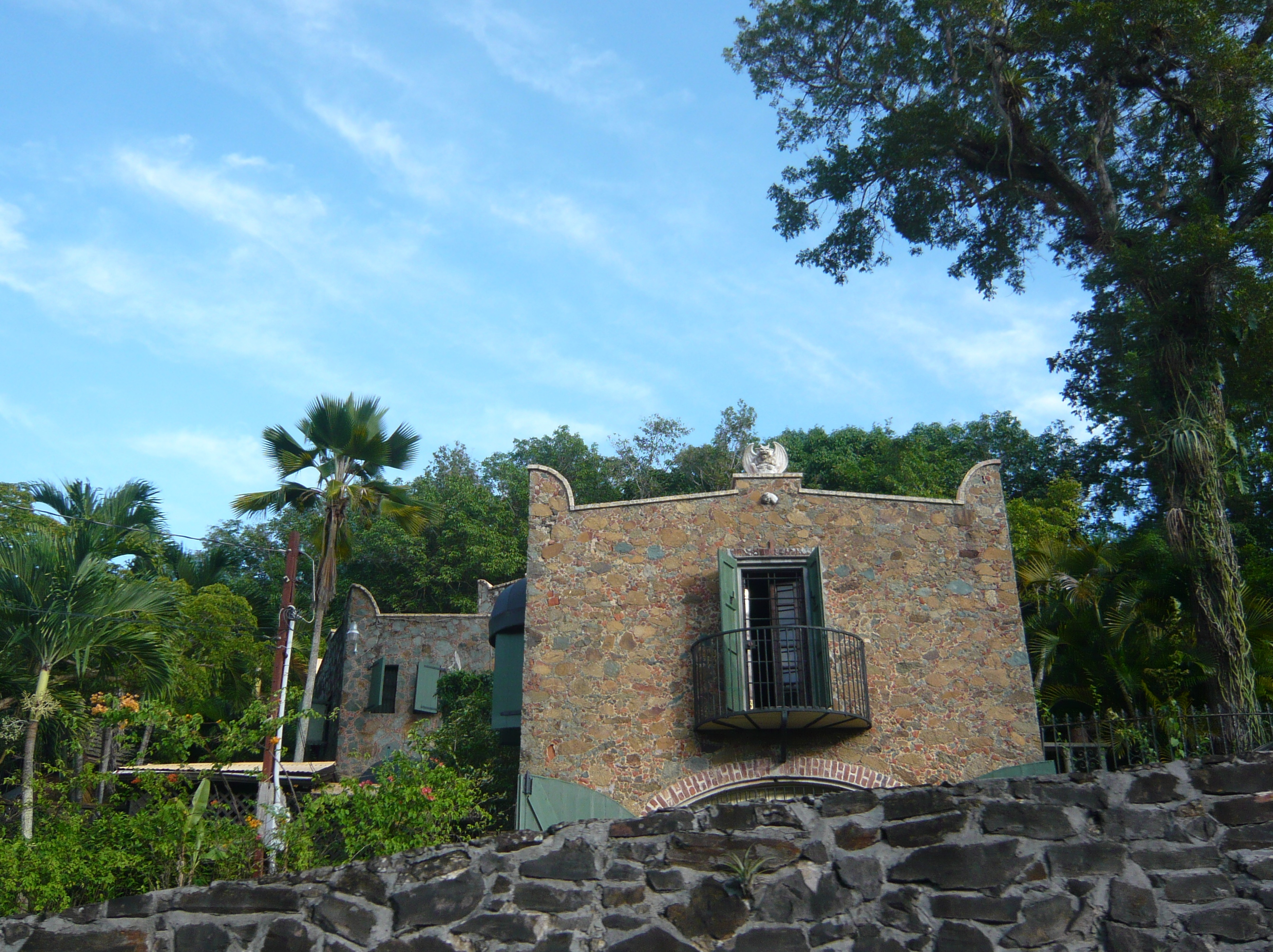
Louisenhoj Castle Gatehouse

Louisenhoj is a settlement on the island of Saint Thomas in the United States Virgin Islands.

The estate was owned by the Magens family, and then by Carl La Beet, who sold it to Arthur S. Fairchild in 1918. Fairchild built Louisenhoj Castle on the ruin of the Estate Zufriedenheit greathouse. The site overlooks both the Atlantic Ocean and Magens Bay to the north and Charlotte Amalie and the Caribbean Sea to the south.
