= Friedensfeld, U.S. Virgin Islands =

Friedensfeld, United States Virgin Islands
- Village
- Location within Saint Croix, U.S. Virgin Islands Location within the U.S. Virgin Islands
- Coordinates: 17°44′45″N 64°46′50″W
- Country: United States Virgin Islands
- Island: Saint Croix
- Time zone: UTC-4 (AST)

Friedensfeld is a settlement on the island of Saint Croix in the United States Virgin Islands.
