= Misgen, U.S. Virgin Islands =

Human settlement in United States Virgin Islands, United States of America

Coordinates: 18°21′16″N 64°55′55″W

Misgen is a settlement on the island of Saint Thomas in the United States Virgin Islands.

== Geography ==
Misgen is located in the central part of Saint Thomas. It is a rocky town mainly with vacation villas. Its average elevation is around 230 Meters (765 Feet).
