= Canaan, U.S. Virgin Islands =

Coordinates: 17.76025°N 64.79653°W

Canaan, United States Virgin Islands
- Village
- Interactive map of Canaan, United States Virgin Islands
- Country: United States Virgin Islands
- Island: Saint Croix
- Time zone: UTC-4 (AST)

Canaan is a settlement on the island of Saint Croix in the United States Virgin Islands.
