= Beeston Hill, U.S. Virgin Islands =

Beeston Hill
- Village
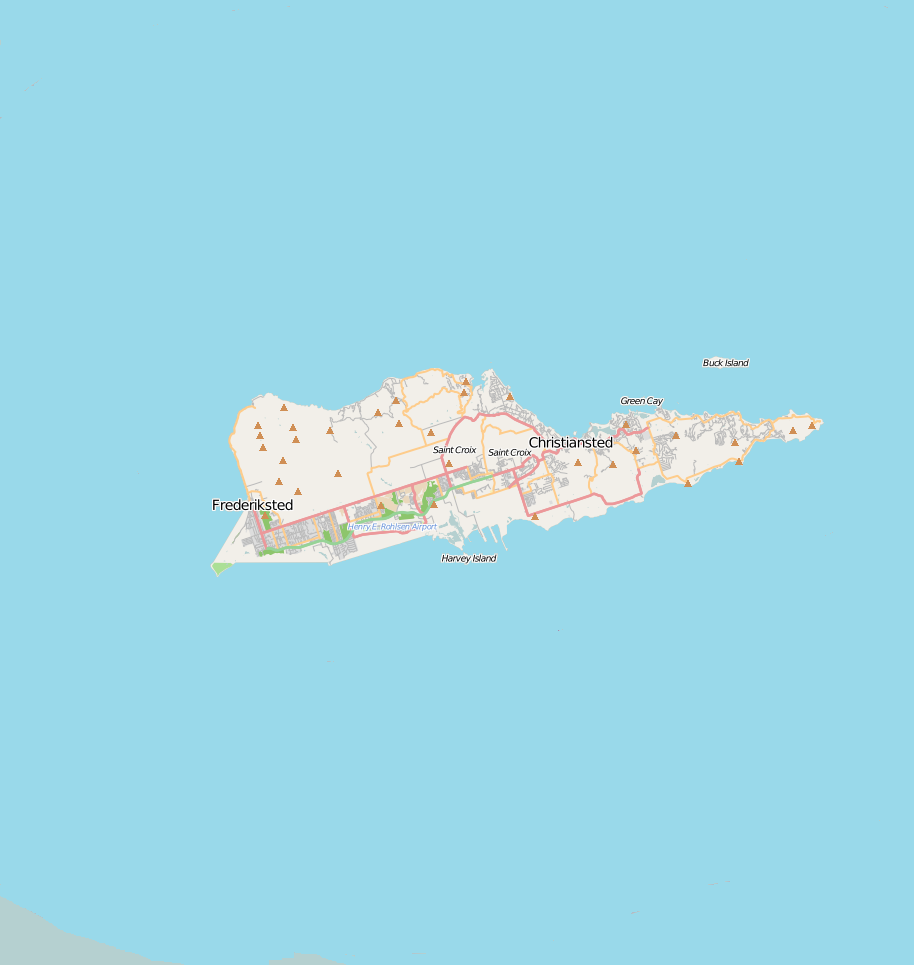
- Location in Saint Croix, United States Virgin Islands
- Coordinates: 17°44′12″N 64°43′21″W
- Country: United States Virgin Islands
- Island: Saint Croix
- Time zone: UTC-4 (AST)

Beeston Hill is a settlement on the island of Saint Croix in the United States Virgin Islands. Beeston Hill is little more than a small hamlet, lying along Route 70.

== History ==
Beeston(hill) (Company’s Quarter No. 6, Christiansteds Police District and Jurisdiction) is a former plantation. Named after Beeston Hill in Leeds, England where the plantation owner Samuel Peter Arey was born and raised. As of 1816, it covered an area of 152 acres of which half was planted with sugarcane. 59 enslaved labourers were present on the estate. On 14 June 1853, it was by Title deed in the hands of Wm. Knight.

== Sources ==
- U.S. Geological Survey Geographic Names Information System: Beeston Hill, U.S. Virgin Islands
