= Adelphi, U.S. Virgin Islands =

Settlement on Saint Thomas, U.S. Virgin Islands

Coordinates: 18°20′54″N 64°59′01″W

Adelphi is a settlement on the island of Saint Thomas in the United States Virgin Islands.

There are visible estate ruins in Adelphi.
