= Neltjeberg, U.S. Virgin Islands =

Coordinates: 18°21′58″N 64°58′23″W

Neltjeberg is a settlement on the island of Saint Thomas in the United States Virgin Islands.
