= Negro Bay, U.S. Virgin Islands =

Coordinates: 17°42′29″N 64°48′27″W

Negro Bay, United States Virgin Islands
- Village
- Interactive map of Negro Bay, United States Virgin Islands
- Country: United States Virgin Islands
- Island: Saint Croix
- Time zone: UTC-4 (AST)

Negro Bay is a settlement on the island of Saint Croix in the United States Virgin Islands.
