= Mafolie, U.S. Virgin Islands =

Settlement on Saint Thomas, U.S. Virgin Islands

Coordinates: 18°21′09″N 64°55′54″W

Mafolie is a settlement on the island of Saint Thomas in the United States Virgin Islands.

Mafolie Great House and Mafolie Hotel are located in Mafolie.
