= Montpellier, U.S. Virgin Islands =

Coordinates: 17.73886°N 64.84237°W

Montpellier, United States Virgin Islands
- Village
- Interactive map of Montpellier, United States Virgin Islands
- Country: United States Virgin Islands
- Island: Saint Croix
- Time zone: UTC-4 (AST)

Montpellier is a settlement on the island of Saint Croix in the United States Virgin Islands.

== History ==
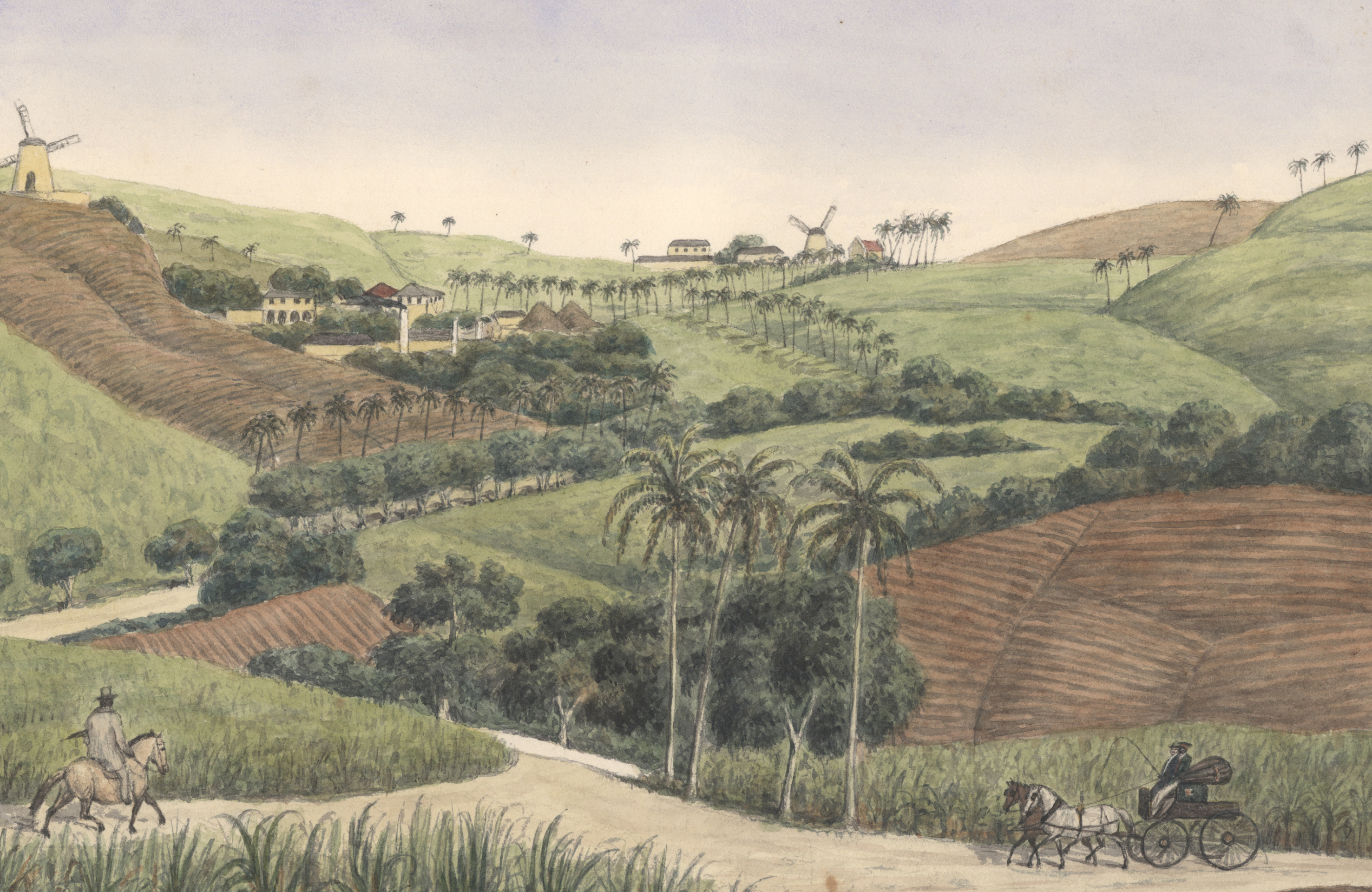
Frederik von Scholten: The plantations Montpeillier and Two Friends, 1846

In the colonial Danish West Indies period, Montpeillier was a sugar plantation.
