= Sorgenfri, U.S. Virgin Islands =

Coordinates: 18°21′56″N 64°58′59″W

Sorgenfri is a settlement on the island of Saint Thomas in the United States Virgin Islands.

== Etymology ==
Sorgenfri means free of sorrow.

== History ==
In 2014, University of the Virgin Islands received a gift of 65 acres (26 ha) of land from Sorgenfri.
