= Parasol, U.S. Virgin Islands =

Coordinates: 17°45′14″N 64°49′02″W

Parasol, United States Virgin Islands
- Village
- Interactive map of Parasol, United States Virgin Islands
- Country: United States Virgin Islands
- Island: Saint Croix
- Time zone: UTC-4 (AST)

Parasol is a settlement on the island of Saint Croix in the United States Virgin Islands.
