= Fortuna, U.S. Virgin Islands =

Coordinates: 18.353011°N 65.005426°W

Fortuna is a settlement on the island of Saint Thomas in the United States Virgin Islands. It is located in the far west of the island.

There are visible estate ruins in Fortuna.
