= Morningstar, U.S. Virgin Islands =

Coordinates: 17°45′30″N 64°45′41″W

Morningstar, United States Virgin Islands
- Village
- Interactive map of Morningstar, United States Virgin Islands
- Country: United States Virgin Islands
- Island: Saint Croix
- Time zone: UTC-4 (AST)

Morningstar is a settlement on the island of Saint Croix in the United States Virgin Islands.

== History ==
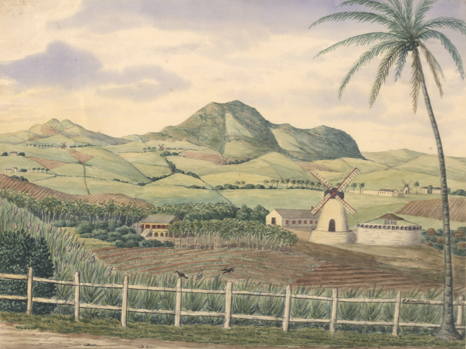
Watercolour by Frederik von Scholten of Morning Star, 1835.

Morning Star (Queens Quarter No. 4 ad 9 and Northside Quarter B. No. 10, Centre Police District, Christiansteds Jurisdiction) is a former sugar plantation. As of 1816, it had a total area of 314 acres of which 137 acres were planted with sugar canes and 177 acres were under other cultivation. 124 enslaved labourers were present on the estate.

On 9 September 1831, Morning Star was sold at auction to William Werwy Abrahamson and Ysbrand Portelje, by attorneys, for guilders 100,000. On 22 March 1856, it was sold by Major Keutsch, as attorney to the directors for the shareholders, to Terrance Farrelly, for $23,500.

== Sources ==
- U.S. Geological Survey Geographic Names Information System: Morningstar, U.S. Virgin Islands
