= Zambee, U.S. Virgin Islands =

Coordinates: 18°21′22″N 64°58′36″W

Zambee is a settlement on the island of Saint Thomas in the United States Virgin Islands.

The local time zone is Atlantic Standard Time which has a UTC offset of -4 hours.

== Location ==
Caribbean, islands 1,100 miles southeast of Florida, 600 miles north of Venezuela, 40 miles east of Puerto Rico; between the Caribbean Sea and the North Atlantic Ocean, bordering the Virgin Islands Trough and the Anegada Passage and roughly 100 miles south of the Puerto Rico Trench.
