= Contant, U.S. Virgin Islands =

Coordinates: 18.34190°N 64.95598°W

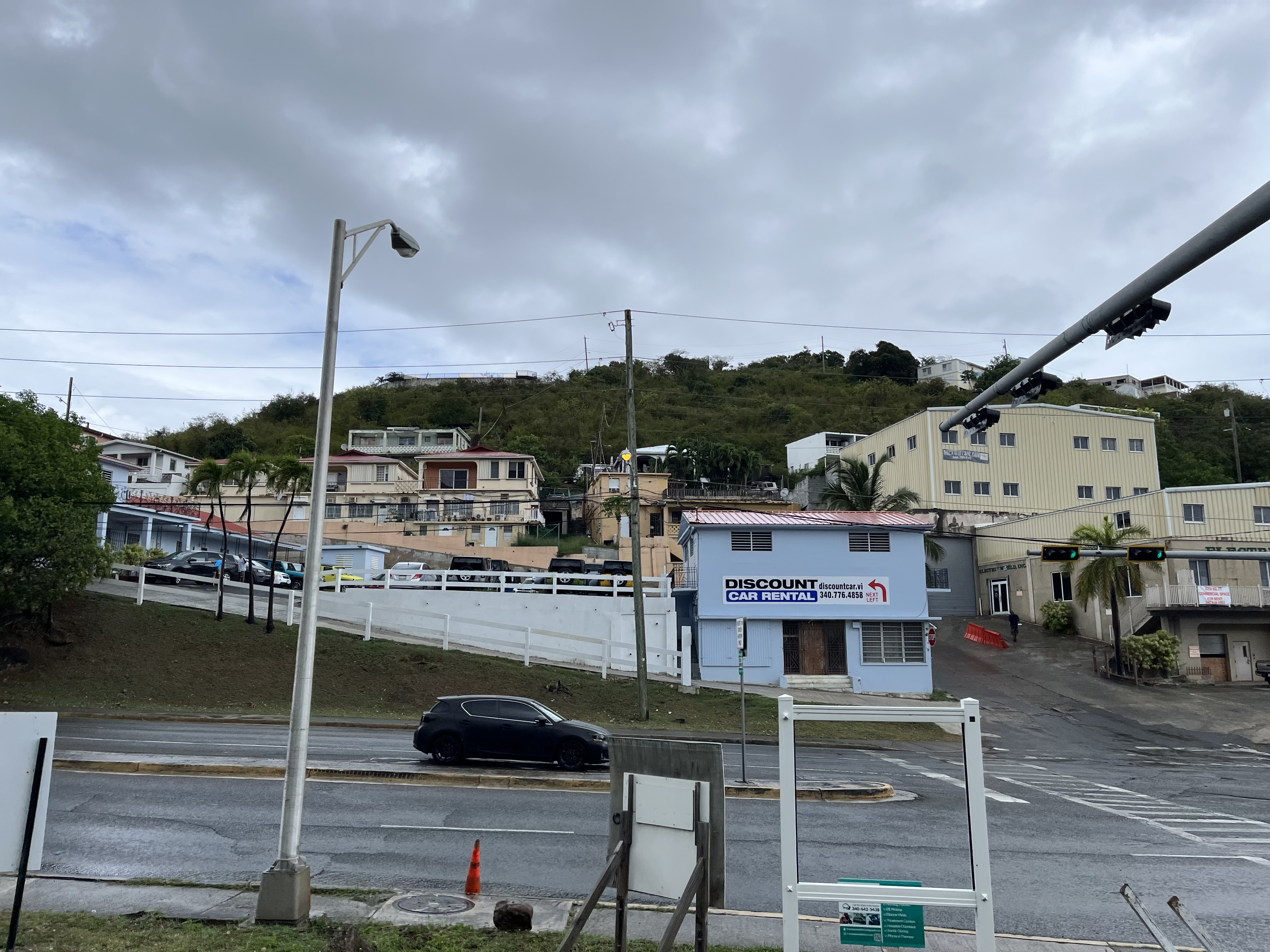
Contant

Contant is a settlement on the island of Saint Thomas in the United States Virgin Islands. It is located between the capital city of Charlotte Amalie and the Cyril E. King Airport.

The 1790 Contant sugarcane mill tower remains in Contant. It was open for many years as part of the Old Mill restaurant, and is now a church.
