= Bonne Esperance, Saint Croix, U.S. Virgin Islands =

Bonne Esperance
- Village
- Location in Saint Croix, United States Virgin Islands Bonne Esperance (the U.S. Virgin Islands)
- Coordinates: 17°44′36″N 64°46′10″W
- Country: United States Virgin Islands
- Island: Saint Croix
- Time zone: UTC-4 (AST)

Bonne Esperance is a settlement on the island of Saint Croix in the United States Virgin Islands.
