= Bonne Esperance, Saint Thomas, U.S. Virgin Islands =

Coordinates: 18.35440°N 64.98709°W

Bonne Esperance is a settlement on the island of Saint Thomas in the United States Virgin Islands.
