= National Register of Historic Places listings in the United States Virgin Islands =

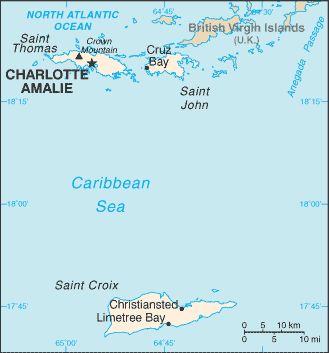
Map of the United States Virgin Islands

This is a list of the buildings, sites, districts, and objects listed on the National Register of Historic Places in the United States Virgin Islands. There are currently 91 listed sites spread across 16 of the 20 subdistricts within three islands/districts of the United States Virgin Islands. Four sites are additionally designated National Historic Landmarks and two others as National Historic Sites.

This National Park Service list is complete through NPS recent listings posted October 2, 2026.

== Numbers of listings ==
The following are approximate tallies of current listings in the United States Virgin Islands on the National Register of Historic Places. These counts are based on entries in the National Register Information Database as of April 24, 2008 and new weekly listings posted since then on the National Register of Historic Places web site. There are frequent additions to the listings and occasional delistings and the counts here are not official. Also, the counts in this table exclude boundary increase and decrease listings which modify the area covered by an existing property or district and which carry a separate National Register reference number.

	District	# of Sites
1	Saint Croix	45
2	Saint John	28
3	Saint Thomas	23
Total:		96

== Saint Croix ==
	Name on the Register	Image	Date listed	Location	Subdistrict	Description
1	Aklis Archeological Site	Aklis Archeological Site	July 1, 1976 (#76001852)	Sandy Point National Wildlife Refuge	Frederiksted	
2	Bethlehem Middle Works Historic District	Bethlehem Middle Works Historic District	July 6, 1988 (#87001932)	King's Quarter; 17°43′04″N 64°47′33″W	Southcentral	
3	Christiansted Historic District	Christiansted Historic District	July 30, 1976 (#76002266)	Roughly bounded by Christiansted Harbor, New, Peter's Farm Hospital, and West Streets; 17°44′46″N 64°42′16″W	Christiansted	
4	Christiansted National Historic Site	Christiansted National Historic Site	October 15, 1966 (#66000077)	Bounded by King, Queen, and Queens Cross Streets and Christiansted Harbor; 17°44′56″N 64°42′08″W	Christiansted	
5	Coakley Bay Estate	Coakley Bay Estate	July 23, 1976 (#76001841)	East of Christiansted; 17°45′31″N 64°38′28″W	East End	Sugarcane plantation site, with 20 feet (6.1 m)-tall stonework of a windmill
6	Columbus Landing Site	Columbus Landing Site	October 15, 1966 (#66000743)	East of Greig Hill on Salt River Bay; 17°46′43″N 64°45′34″W	East End	
7	Danish West India and Guinea Company Warehouse	Danish West India and Guinea Company Warehouse	October 9, 1974 (#74001940)	Church and Company Streets; 17°44′47″N 64°42′09″W	Christiansted	
8	Diamond School	Diamond School	July 1, 1976 (#76001842)	West of Christiansted on Centerline Road; 17°42′47″N 64°49′47″W	Southcentral	
9	Estate Butler's Bay	Estate Butler's Bay	August 25, 1978 (#78002722)	North of Frederiksted; 17°44′57″N 64°53′32″W	Northwest	
10	Estate Grove Place	Estate Grove Place	July 17, 1978 (#78002721)	4 miles (6.4 km) east of Frederiksted off Centerline Road; 17°43′39″N 64°49′27″W	Northwest	Sugar factory, chimney, and wagon depot
11	Estate Hogansborg		February 17, 1978 (#78002723)	East of Frederiksted off Centerline Road; 17°42′39″N 64°50′44″W	Northwest	
12	Estate Judith's Fancy	Estate Judith's Fancy	July 17, 1978 (#78002717)	4 miles (6.4 km) northwest of Christiansted; 17°46′41″N 64°44′44″W	Sion Farm	
13	Estate La Reine		November 24, 1980 (#80003994)	20 Kings Quarter and 19 Queens Quarter; 17°44′09″N 64°46′19″W	Northcentral	
14	Estate Little Princess	Estate Little Princess	June 9, 1980 (#80003995)	Northwest of Christiansted; 17°45′35″N 64°43′31″W	Sion Farm	
15	Estate Mount Victory		February 17, 1978 (#78002724)	Northeast of Frederiksted; 17°45′13″N 64°52′05″W	Northwest	
16	Estate Prosperity		February 17, 1978 (#78002725)	North of Frederiksted; 17°43′42″N 64°52′53″W	Northwest	
17	Estate Saint George Historic District	Estate Saint George Historic District	October 24, 1986 (#86003351)	Prince Quarter; 17°43′05″N 64°49′49″W	Northwest	
18	Estate St. John		June 9, 1978 (#78002718)	3 miles (4.8 km) northwest of Christiansted; 17°45′57″N 64°44′48″W	Sion Farm	
19	Fair Plain Archeological District	Fair Plain Archeological District	September 29, 1976 (#76001843)	Address Restricted	Christiansted	
20	Fairplain Historic and Archeological District	Fairplain Historic and Archeological District	July 6, 1988 (#87001903)	Address Restricted	Christiansted	
21	Frederiksted Historic District	Frederiksted Historic District	August 9, 1976 (#76001853)	Roughly bounded by Fisher Street, the cemetery, and Fort Frederik; 17°42′44″N 64°52′53″W	Frederiksted	
22	Friedensfeld Midlands Moravian Church and Manse	Friedensfeld Midlands Moravian Church and Manse	July 1, 1976 (#76001844)	West of Christiansted; 17°44′53″N 64°46′48″W	Northcentral	
23	Friedensthal Mission	Friedensthal Mission	August 25, 1978 (#78002719)	Southwest of Christiansted; 17°44′39″N 64°42′35″W	Christiansted	
24	Ft. Frederik of US Virgin Islands	Ft. Frederik of US Virgin Islands	September 25, 1997 (#96001073)	South of junction of Mahogany Road and U.S. Virgin Island Highway 631, north end of Frederiksted; 17°42′55″N 64°53′01″W	Frederiksted	
25	Great Pond Archeological Site	Great Pond Archeological Site	July 12, 1976 (#76001845)	Address Restricted	Christiansted	
26	Green Kay		July 19, 1976 (#76001846)	East of Christiansted; 17°45′32″N 64°39′16″W	East End	
27	Hams Bluff Light	Hams Bluff Light	September 16, 2019 (#100004382)	Crest of Hams Bluff, 1400 feet east of N. end of Hams Bluff Rd. 17°46′09″N 64°52′15″W	Frederiksted	
28	Holy Cross Episcopal Church		July 25, 2024 (#100010641)	1 Estate Upper Love; 17°43′58″N 64°48′24″W	Upper Love	
29	Kingshill Lutheran Church		July 25, 2024 (#100010640)	18-AA Upper Bethlehem; 17°43′36″N 64°46′47″W	Kingshill	
30	La Grande Princesse School		July 12, 1976 (#76001847)	Northeast of Christiansted; 17°45′21″N 64°43′54″W	Sion Farm	
31	La Grange Historic District		July 29, 2024 (#100010647)	Parcels 74, 75, 242, 40, 64 Estate La Grange; 17°43′08″N 64°52′37″W	Estate La Grange	
32	Little La Grange		October 22, 1976 (#76001854)	Northeast of Frederiksted; 17°43′47″N 64°51′54″W	Northwest	
33	Lower Granard Archeological District	Lower Granard Archeological District	July 1, 1976 (#76001849)	Address Restricted	Christiansted	
34	Prosperity Archeological Site	Prosperity Archeological Site	July 12, 1976 (#76001855)	Address Restricted	Frederiksted	
35	Richmond Prison Detention and Workhouse		February 14, 1978 (#78002720)	West of Christiansted; 17°44′53″N 64°42′45″W	Christiansted	
36	River Archeological Site	River Archeological Site	July 1, 1976 (#76001856)	Address Restricted	Frederiksted	
37	St. Georges Archeological Site	St. Georges Archeological Site	September 29, 1976 (#76001857)	Address Restricted	Frederiksted	
38	St. John's Episcopal Church	St. John's Episcopal Church	October 4, 2016 (#16000698)	Plot #27 King Street; 17°44′35″N 64°42′28″W	Christiansted	
39	Salt River Bay National Historic Site and Ecological Preserve	Salt River Bay National Historic Site and Ecological Preserve	February 24, 1992 (#01000280)	2100 Church Street; 17°46′52″N 64°45′23″W	Christiansted	
40	Sion Hill	Sion Hill	July 19, 1976 (#76001850)	West of Christiansted; 17°44′35″N 64°44′41″W	Sion Farm	
41	Slob Historic District		November 12, 1987 (#87001929)	King's Quarter; 17°43′54″N 64°46′16″W	Sion Farm	
42	Sprat Hall Historic District		July 29, 2024 (#100010646)	29 Sprat Hall; 17°44′24″N 64°53′22″W	Sprat Hall	
43	Strawberry Hill Historic District		October 2, 1987 (#87001934)	Queen's Quarter; 17°43′57″N 64°45′37″W	Sion Farm	
44	Upper Salt River Archeological District	Upper Salt River Archeological District	September 1, 1976 (#76001851)	Address Restricted	Christiansted	
45	Whim	Whim	July 30, 1976 (#76001858)	1.7 miles (2.7 km) southeast of Frederiksted on Centerline Road; 17°42′10″N 64°51′47″W	Southwest	

== Saint John ==
	Name on the Register	Image	Date listed	Location	Subdistrict	Description
1	Annaberg Historic District	Annaberg Historic District	July 23, 1981 (#81000090)	Northwest of Coral Bay, Leinster Bay; 18°21′53″N 64°44′18″W	Central	
2	Brown Bay Plantation Historic District		July 23, 1981 (#81000089)	North of Palestina; 18°21′47″N 64°42′25″W	Central	Virgin Islands National Park MRA
3	Catherineberg-Jockumsdahl-Herman Farm	Catherineberg-Jockumsdahl-Herman Farm	March 30, 1978 (#78000270)	East of Cruz Bay; 18°20′49″N 64°45′39″W	Central	Virgin Islands National Park MRA
4	Cinnamon Bay Plantation	Cinnamon Bay Plantation	July 11, 1978 (#78000269)	Northeast of Cruz Bay on Cinnamon Bay; 18°21′15″N 64°45′15″W	Central	Virgin Islands National Park MRA
5	Congo Cay Archeological District		December 1, 1978 (#78003166)	Address Restricted	Cruz Bay	Virgin Islands National Park MRA
6	Cruz Bay Town Historic District	Cruz Bay Town Historic District	October 4, 2016 (#16000699)	Town boundary 18°19′52″N 64°47′42″W	Cruz Bay	
7	Dennis Bay Historic District	Dennis Bay Historic District	July 23, 1981 (#81000095)	Northeast of Cruz Bay off North Shore Road; 18°21′15″N 64°46′33″W	Central	Virgin Islands National Park MRA
8	Emmaus Moravian Church and Manse	Emmaus Moravian Church and Manse	November 7, 1977 (#77001531)	West of Palestina; 18°21′01″N 64°42′48″W	Coral Bay	
9	East End Schoolhouse: St. John US Virgin Islands		July 29, 2024 (#100010648)	6-K Hansen Bay; 18°20′29″N 64°40′27″W	Hansen Bay	
10	Enighed	Enighed	July 1, 1976 (#76002219)	Cruz Bay Quarter; 18°19′54″N 64°47′30″W	Cruz Bay	
11	Estate Beverhoudt		August 29, 1978 (#78003170)	1.5 miles (2.4 km) east of Cruz Bay off Center Line Road; 18°20′27″N 64°46′19″W	Central	
12	Estate Carolina Sugar Plantation	Estate Carolina Sugar Plantation	July 19, 1976 (#76002217)	West of Coral Bay on King Hill Road; 18°20′58″N 64°43′07″W	Coral Bay	
13	Fortsberg	Fortsberg	September 1, 1976 (#76002218)	Southeast of Coral Bay; 18°20′45″N 64°42′20″W	Coral Bay	
14	Benjamin Franklin School		July 30, 2024 (#100010650)	2 Estate Emmaus; 18°20′53″N 64°42′46″W	Coral Bay	
15	Hermitage Plantation Historic District		July 23, 1981 (#81000094)	East End Road, Hurricane Hole; 18°21′32″N 64°41′59″W	Central	Virgin Islands National Park MRA
16	HMS Santa Monica	HMS Santa Monica	February 17, 1978 (#78003163)	Address Restricted	Coral Bay	
17	Jossie Gut Historic District		July 23, 1981 (#81000086)	West of Coral Bay off Center Line Road, Reef Bay; 18°20′32″N 64°44′25″W	Ceentral	Virgin Islands National Park MRA
18	L'Esperance Historic District		July 23, 1981 (#81000699)	East of Cruz Bay off Center Line Road, Reef Bay; 18°20′33″N 64°45′30″W	Central	Virgin Islands National Park MRA
19	Lameshur Plantation	Lameshur Plantation	June 23, 1978 (#78000271)	East of Cruz Bay on Little Lameshur Bay; 18°20′33″N 64°45′30″W	Central	Virgin Islands National Park MRA
20	Liever Marches Bay Historic District		July 23, 1981 (#81000087)	East of Brown Bay; 18°21′16″N 64°42′04″W	Central	Virgin Islands National Park MRA
21	Lind Point Fort	Lind Point Fort	July 23, 1981 (#81000085)	Northwest of Cruz Bay; 18°20′13″N 64°47′50″W	Central	Virgin Islands National Park MRA
22	Mary Point Estate	Mary Point Estate	May 22, 1978 (#78000272)	Northeast of Cruz Bay; 18°22′06″N 64°44′29″W	Central	Virgin Islands National Park MRA
23	More Hill Historic District		July 23, 1981 (#81000092)	Off East End Road; 18°21′40″N 64°41′37″W	East End	Virgin Islands National Park MRA
24	Petroglyph Site	Petroglyph Site	July 7, 1982 (#82001716)	Reef Bay	Central	
25	Reef Bay Great House Historic District	Reef Bay Great House Historic District	July 23, 1981 (#81000091)	West of Bordeaux, Reef Bay; 18°19′55″N 64°44′23″W	Central	Virgin Islands National Park MRA
26	Reef Bay Sugar Factory Historic District	Reef Bay Sugar Factory Historic District	July 23, 1981 (#81000084)	East of Cruz Bay, Reef Bay; 18°19′31″N 64°44′40″W	Central	Virgin Islands National Park MRA
27	Rustenberg Plantation South Historic District		July 23, 1981 (#81000093)	West of Coral Bay off Center Line Road, Cinnamon Bay; 18°20′42″N 64°44′59″W	Central	Virgin Islands National Park MRA
28	Trunk Bay Sugar Factory		July 23, 1981 (#81000088)	Northeast of Cruz Bay on North Shore Road, Trunk Bay; 18°21′35″N 64°46′02″W	Central	Virgin Islands National Park MRA

=== Former listings ===
	Name on the Register	Image	Date listed	Date removed	Location	Subdistrict	Description
1	Keating's Inn		July 6, 1976 (#76002220)	November 1, 1979	Address Restricted	Cruz Bay	Demolished on August 20, 1979.

== Saint Thomas ==
	Name on the Register	Image	Date listed	Location	Subdistrict	Description
1	Barracks No. 2		July 30, 2024 (#100010644)	8189 Subbase Road; 18°20′00″N 64°57′33″W	Charlotte Amalie vicinity	
2	Bordeaux	Bordeaux	November 15, 1978 (#78002726)	West of Charlotte Amalie; 18°21′47″N 65°00′59″W	West End	
3	Botany Bay Archeological District	Botany Bay Archeological District	July 1, 1976 (#76001859)	Address Restricted	Charlotte Amalie	
4	Charlotte Amalie Historic District	Charlotte Amalie Historic District	July 19, 1976 (#76001860)	Roughly bounded by Nytvaer, Berg and Government Hills, Bjebre Gade and St. Thomas Harbor; also 61-62 Kronprinsdsens Gade; 18°20′42″N 64°55′55″W	Charlotte Amalie	Second set of addresses represent a boundary increase approved July 3, 2024.
5	Estate Botany Bay	Estate Botany Bay	July 30, 1976 (#76001861)	West of Charlotte Amalie; 18°21′37″N 65°01′53″W	West End	
6	Estate Brewers Bay	Estate Brewers Bay	July 31, 1978 (#78002727)	2 miles (3.2 km) west of Charlotte Amalie at Brewers Bay; 18°20′51″N 64°58′45″W	Charlotte Amalie	
7	Estate Havensight	Estate Havensight	February 17, 1978 (#78002728)	South of Charlotte Amalie; 18°19′53″N 64°55′23″W	Charlotte Amalie	
8	Estate Neltjeberg		February 17, 1978 (#78002729)	Northwest of Charlotte Amalie; 18°22′13″N 64°57′58″W	West End	
9	Estate Niesky	Estate Niesky	August 29, 1978 (#78003092)	1.5 miles (2.4 km) west of Charlotte Amalie off Harwood Highway; 18°20′19″N 64°57′06″W	Charlotte Amalie	
10	Estate Perseverance		February 17, 1978 (#78002730)	West of Charlotte Amalie, Virgin Islands; 18°21′18″N 64°59′51″W	West End	
11	Fort Christian	Fort Christian	May 5, 1977 (#77001329)	At Saint Thomas Harbor; 18°20′26″N 64°55′47″W	Charlotte Amalie	Danish fort, the oldest structure in the U.S. Virgin Islands
12	Hamburg-America Shipping Line Administrative Offices	Hamburg-America Shipping Line Administrative Offices	October 10, 1978 (#78002731)	48B Tolbod Gade; 18°20′30″N 64°55′53″W	Charlotte Amalie	
13	Hassel Island Historic District	Hassel Island Historic District	July 19, 1976 (#76001862)	South of Charlotte Amalie in Saint Thomas Harbor; 18°19′46″N 64°56′08″W	Charlotte Amalie	
14	Hull Bay Archeological District	Hull Bay Archeological District	September 1, 1976 (#76001863)	Address Restricted	Charlotte Amalie	
15	Krum Bay Archeological District	Krum Bay Archeological District	August 28, 1976 (#76001864)	Address Restricted	Charlotte Amalie	
16	Mafolie Great House	Mafolie Great House	February 17, 1978 (#78002732)	North of Charlotte Amalie; 18°21′13″N 64°55′42″W	Northside	
17	Magens Bay Archeological District		July 30, 1976 (#76001865)	Address Restricted	Charlotte Amalie	
18	Evelyn E. Marcelli Elementary School	Evelyn E. Marcelli Elementary School	July 25, 2024 (#100010645)	Haabets Gade 4; 18°20′29″N 64°56′24″W	Charlotte Amalie	
19	New Herrnhut Moravian Church	New Herrnhut Moravian Church	October 8, 1976 (#76001866)	East of Charlotte Amalie; 18°20′13″N 64°54′05″W	Northside	
20	Blackbeard's Castle (Skytsborg)	Blackbeard's Castle (Skytsborg)	December 20, 1991 (#91001844)	39 Donningens Gade; 18°20′46″N 64°55′46″W	Charlotte Amalie	
21	St. Thomas Synagogue	St. Thomas Synagogue	September 25, 1997 (#97001270)	Crystal Gade #16AB, Queens Quarters; 18°20′34″N 64°55′58″W	Charlotte Amalie	
22	Tutu Plantation House	Tutu Plantation House	July 12, 1976 (#76001867)	3 miles (4.8 km) northeast of Charlotte Amalie, United States Virgin Islands; 18°20′31″N 64°53′08″W	Tutu	
23	Venus Hill	Venus Hill	February 17, 1978 (#78002733)	North of Charlotte Amalie; 18°21′12″N 64°55′46″W	Northside	

== See also ==
- List of United States National Historic Landmarks in United States commonwealths and territories, associated states, and foreign states
