= Sandy Point National Wildlife Refuge =

Protected area in Saint Croix, U.S. Virgin Islands

- IUCN category IV (habitat/species management area)
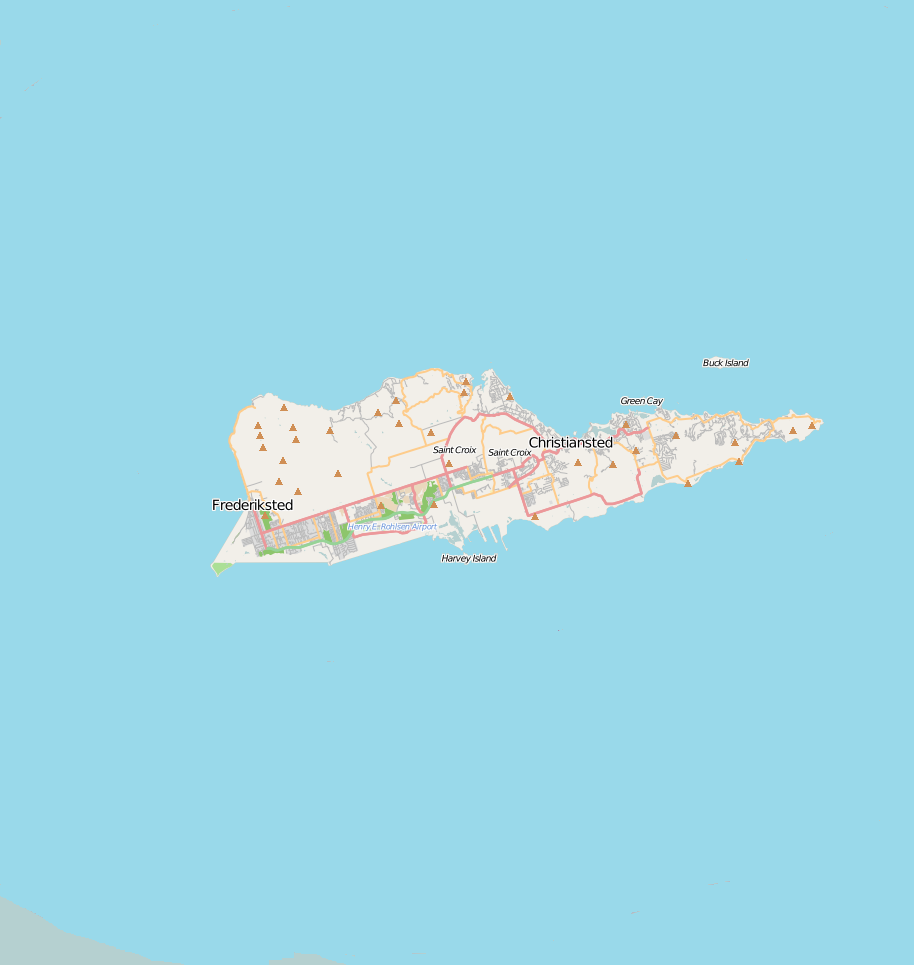
- Location within Saint Croix, US Virgin Islands Location within the U.S. Virgin Islands
- Location: St. Croix, Virgin Islands, United States
- Nearest city: Frederiksted, VI
- Coordinates: 17°40′40″N 64°54′0″W
- Area: 360 acres (146 ha)
- Established: 1984
- Visitors: 11,000 (in 2005)
- Governing body: U.S. Fish and Wildlife Service
- Website: Sandy Point National Wildlife Refuge

Sandy Point National Wildlife Refuge is a wildlife refuge for threatened and endangered species, with particular emphasis on the leatherback sea turtle (Dermochelys coriacea), located on the southwest corner of Saint Croix, U.S. Virgin Islands. Its two miles (3 km) of sandy beaches are ideal for nesting leatherbacks. The National Wildlife Refuge is open to the public for limited hours on Saturdays and Sundays.

The Aklis Archeological Site, a prehistoric shell midden on the coast, is located within the refuge. The 10-acre (4.0 ha) site dates back to the year 400 and shows extensive evidence of human occupation for over 200 years. It has yielded a wide variety of artifacts, including pottery and stone tool fragments, and human remains. The site is subject to continuous erosion. It was listed on the National Register of Historic Places in 1976. Archaeological testing, salvage, and excavations at Aklis led by crews from the Cobb Institute of Archaeology at Mississippi State University began in 2012 and are ongoing.

The last scene of the 1994 film The Shawshank Redemption was filmed in the refuge.

Sandy Point NWR is administered as part of the Caribbean Islands National Wildlife complex.

== Gallery ==
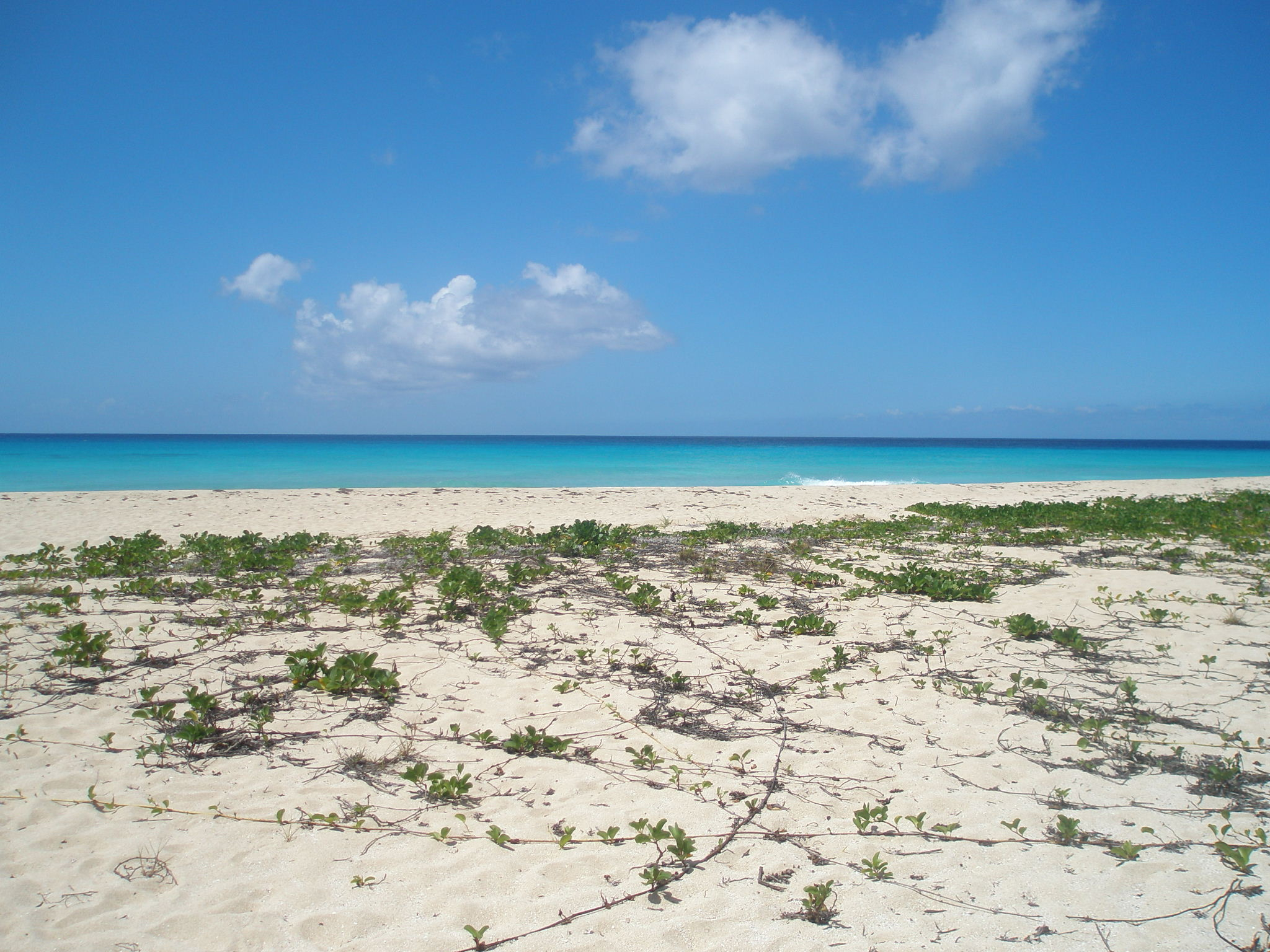
Sandy Point beach

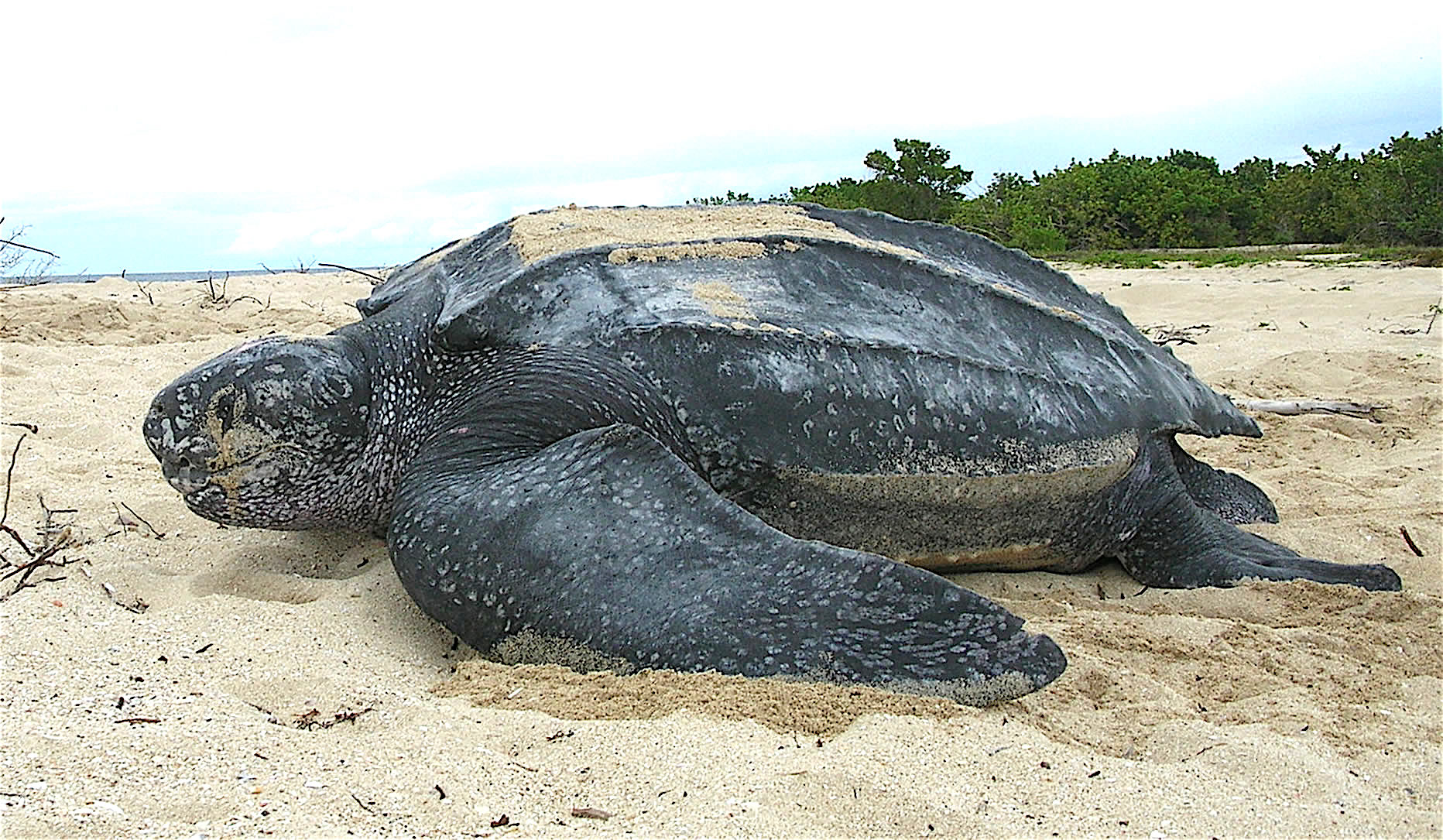
Leatherback sea turtle on the refuge

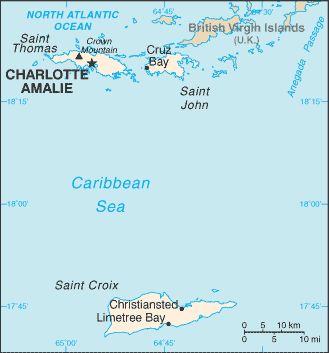
Map of the US Virgin Islands

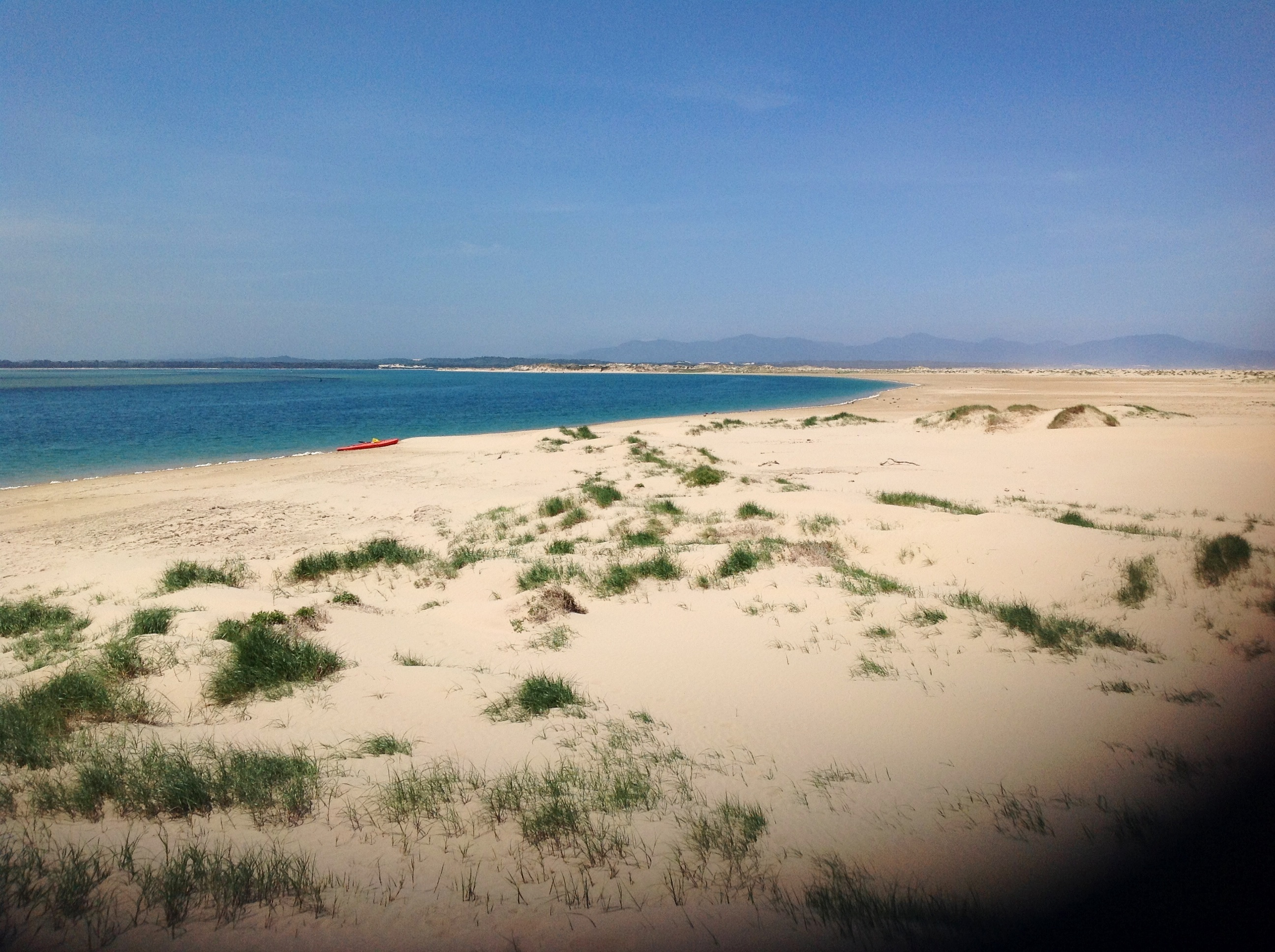
Sandy Point beach

== See also ==
- List of National Wildlife Refuges
- National Register of Historic Places listings in the United States Virgin Islands
