= List of United States National Historic Landmarks in United States commonwealths and territories, associated states, and foreign states =

This is a list of National Historic Landmarks in U.S. commonwealths and territories, associated states, and foreign states.

Included are lists of National Historic Landmarks (NHLs) and of National Park Service administered areas in U.S. Commonwealths and territories, U.S.-associated states, and in the foreign state of Morocco. There are 25 NHLs in these areas.

== Key ==
	National Historic Landmark
^{†}	National Historic Landmark District
^{#}	National Historic Site, National Historical Park, National Memorial, or National Monument
^{*}	Delisted Landmark

== NHLs in U.S. commonwealths and territories ==
	Landmark name	Image	Date designated	Location	Commonwealth/Territory	Description
1	Blunts Point Battery	Blunts Point Battery	May 28, 1987 (#73002128)	Pago Pago; 14°17′27″S 170°40′30″W	American Samoa	A rare intact Pacific coastal battery, built as part of the fortification of the Samoan Islands after Pearl Harbor.
2	Government House	Government House	December 14, 1990 (#72001443)	Pago Pago; 14°16′57″S 170°40′54″W	American Samoa	A symbol of United States military and diplomatic relations throughout the South Pacific through World War I and World War II. Now the residence of the governor of American Samoa.
3^{†}	World War II Facilities at Midway	World War II Facilities at Midway	May 28, 1987 (#87001302)	Midway Atoll; 28°12′N 177°21′W	Midway Islands	Site of pivotal Battle of Midway which changed the balance of sea power during World War II.
4	Manenggon Concentration Camp		December 13, 2024 (#100011376)	Address restricted	Guam	Japanese-run concentration camp for indigenous Guamanians during the Second World War.
5^{†}	Landing Beaches; Aslito/Isley Field; & Marpi Point, Saipan Island	Landing Beaches; Aslito/Isley Field; & Marpi Point, Saipan Island	February 4, 1985 (#85001789)	Saipan; 15°06′59″N 145°43′41″E	Northern Mariana Islands	
6	Latte Quarry at As Nieves	Latte Quarry at As Nieves	December 13, 2024 (#100011371)	Rota; 14°10′17″N 145°15′30″E	Northern Mariana Islands	
7^{†}	Tinian Landing Beaches, Ushi Point & North Fields, Tinian Island	Tinian Landing Beaches, Ushi Point & North Fields, Tinian Island	December 30, 1985 (#85003268)	Tinian; 15°04′54″N 145°37′57″E	Northern Mariana Islands	
8	Antonio Lopez	Antonio Lopez	December 9, 1997 (#93001593)	Dorado; 18°28′48″N 66°13′50″W	Puerto Rico	Shipwreck of the first Spanish-built steel vessel with a complete electrical lighting system, and one of the most important Spanish blockade-runners during the Spanish–American War. The shipwreck is the only known Spanish wreck in American waters from the conflict.
9	Caguana Site	Caguana Site	November 4, 1993 (#92001671)	Utuado; 18°17′49″N 66°46′55″W	Puerto Rico	Taíno archaeological site considered to be one of the most important Pre-Columbian sites in the West Indies.
10	Caparra Archaeological Site	Caparra Archaeological Site	April 19, 1994 (#84003155)	Guaynabo; 18°24′18″N 66°06′51″W	Puerto Rico	Contains the remains of the first Spanish capital of Puerto Rico, settled in 1508 and abandoned in 1521. It represents the oldest known European settlement on United States territory.
11	Casa Dra. Concha Melendez Ramirez	Casa Dra. Concha Melendez Ramirez	February 27, 2013 (#11000414)	San Juan; 18°27′10″N 66°04′03″W	Puerto Rico	The home of Dra. Concha Meléndez Ramírez, a writer and critic of the Generación del Treinta (Generation of 1930), a literary movement that shaped Puerto Rico's 20th-century national cultural identity.
12	La Fortaleza	La Fortaleza	October 9, 1960 (#66000951)	San Juan; 18°27′50″N 66°07′09″W	Puerto Rico	Built between 1533 and 1540 to defend the harbor of San Juan. Today it serves as the residence of the governor of Puerto Rico, and it is the oldest executive mansion in continuous use in the Americas.
13^{†}	Old San Juan Historic District	Old San Juan Historic District	February 27, 2013 (#13000284)	San Juan; 18°26′44″N 66°04′33″W	Puerto Rico	A well-preserved Spanish colonial city. Nearly 400 years old, it is the oldest colonial settlement under the United States jurisdiction.
14	Columbus Landing Site	Columbus Landing Site	October 9, 1960 (#66000743)	Saint Croix; 17°46′44″N 64°45′32″W	Virgin Islands	
15	Fort Christian	Fort Christian	May 5, 1977 (#77001329)	Saint Thomas; 18°20′27″N 64°55′47″W	Virgin Islands	
16	Fort Frederik	Fort Frederik	September 25, 1997 (#97001269)	Saint Croix; 17°42′55″N 64°53′00″W	Virgin Islands	
17	St. Thomas Synagogue	St. Thomas Synagogue	September 25, 1997 (#97001270)	Saint Thomas; 18°20′41″N 64°55′59″W	Virgin Islands	
18	Blackbeard's Castle (Skytsborg)	Blackbeard's Castle (Skytsborg)	October 12, 1994 (#91001844)	Saint Thomas; 18°20′38″N 64°55′47″W	Virgin Islands	
19	Wake Island	Wake Island	September 16, 1985 (#85002726)	Wake Island; 19°18′00″N 166°38′00″E	Wake Island	

== NHLs in associated states ==
This is a complete list of the five National Historic Landmarks in sovereign states that are in free association with the United States.

	Landmark name	Image	Date designated	Location	State	Description
1^{†}	Kwajalein Island Battlefield	Kwajalein Island Battlefield	February 4, 1985 (#85001757)	Kwajalein; 8°43′00″N 167°44′00″E	Marshall Islands	This district encompasses the entire 1944 bounds of Kwajalein Island, commemorating its role in the 1944 Battle of Kwajalein.
2^{†}	Roi-Namur	Roi-Namur	February 4, 1985 (#85001758)	Kwajalein; 9°23′46″N 167°28′33″E	Marshall Islands	This district encompasses all of Roi-Namur island, commemorating its role in the 1944 Battle of Kwajalein.
3^{†}	Nan Madol	Nan Madol	September 16, 1985 (#74002226)	Pohnpei; 6°50′31″N 158°19′56″E	Federated States of Micronesia	
4^{†}	Truk Lagoon Underwater Fleet, Truk Atoll	Truk Lagoon Underwater Fleet, Truk Atoll	February 4, 1985 (#76002267)	Chuuk; 7°25′00″N 151°47′00″E	Federated States of Micronesia	
5	Peleliu Battlefield	Peleliu Battlefield	February 4, 1985 (#85001754)	Peleliu; 7°00′01″N 134°13′23″E	Palau	

== U.S. NHLs in foreign states ==
	Landmark name	Image	Date designated	Location	State	Description
1	American Legation	American Legation	December 17, 1982 (#81000703)	Tangier; 35°47′02″N 5°48′38″W	Morocco	The first property on foreign soil owned by the US government.

== National Park Service Areas in U.S. Commonwealths and Territories ==
Also of historical interest are:

- Christiansted National Historic Site, in U.S. Virgin Islands
- Salt River Bay National Historical Park and Ecological Preserve, in U.S. Virgin Islands (also an NHL, listed above as Columbus Landing Site)
- San Juan National Historic Site, in Puerto Rico
- War in the Pacific National Historical Park in Guam

Other National Park Service-administered areas in U.S. commonwealths and territories are:

- National Park of American Samoa, in American Samoa
- Buck Island Reef National Monument, in U.S. Virgin Islands
- Virgin Islands Coral Reef National Monument, in U.S. Virgin Islands
- Virgin Islands National Park, in U.S. Virgin Islands
- American Memorial Park (affiliated area), in the Northern Mariana Islands

A former US National Historical Site is St. Thomas National Historic Site, transferred to Virgin Islands.

== See also ==
- List of National Historic Landmarks by state
- National Register of Historic Places listings in American Samoa
- National Register of Historic Places listings in Palau
- National Register of Historic Places listings in Puerto Rico
- National Register of Historic Places listings in the Federated States of Micronesia
- National Register of Historic Places listings in the Marshall Islands
- National Register of Historic Places listings in the Northern Mariana Islands
- National Register of Historic Places listings in the United States Virgin Islands
