= Salt River Bay National Historical Park and Ecological Preserve =

National Park Service unit in the U.S. Virgin Islands

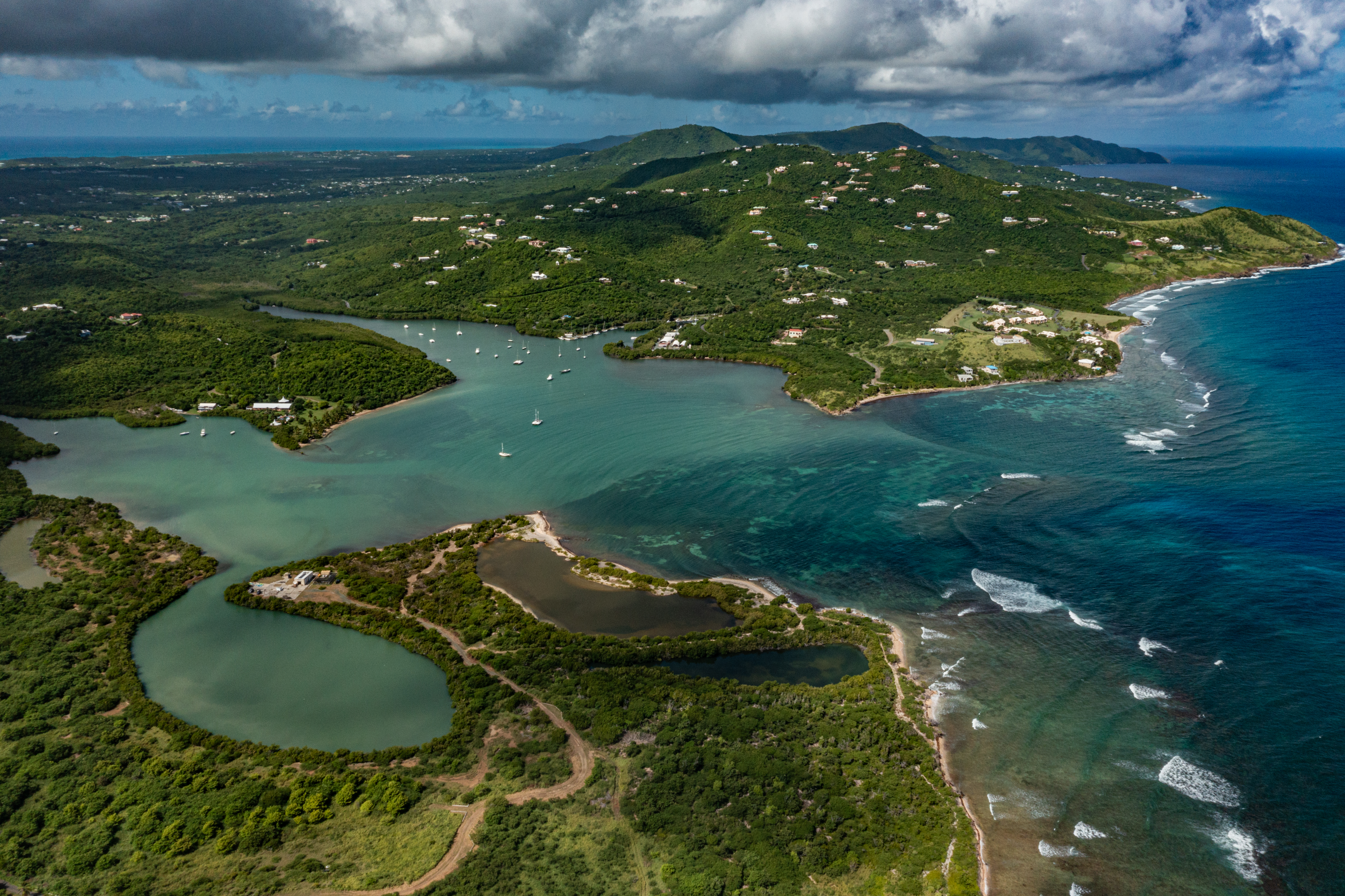
- Interactive map of Salt River Bay National Historical Park and Ecological Preserve
- Location: St. Croix, U.S. Virgin Islands
- Coordinates: 17°46′29″N 64°45′21″W
- Area: 985.76 acres (3.9892 km^{2})
- Established: February 24, 1992
- Visitors: 12,126 (in 2025)
- Governing body: National Park Service
- Website: Salt River Bay National Historical Park and Ecological Preserve

Salt River Bay National Historic Park and Ecological Preserve is a unit of the National Park Service on the island of St. Croix in the U.S. Virgin Islands. It preserves upland watersheds, mangrove forests, and estuarine and marine environments that support threatened and endangered species. It also contains the Columbus Landing Site, a National Historic Landmark that is the only known site where members of a Columbus expedition set foot on what is now United States territory. The site is marked by Fort Salé, a remaining earthworks fortification from the French period of occupation, about 1617. The park also preserves prehistoric and colonial-era archeological sites including the only existing example of a ball court in the US Virgin Islands.

== Description ==
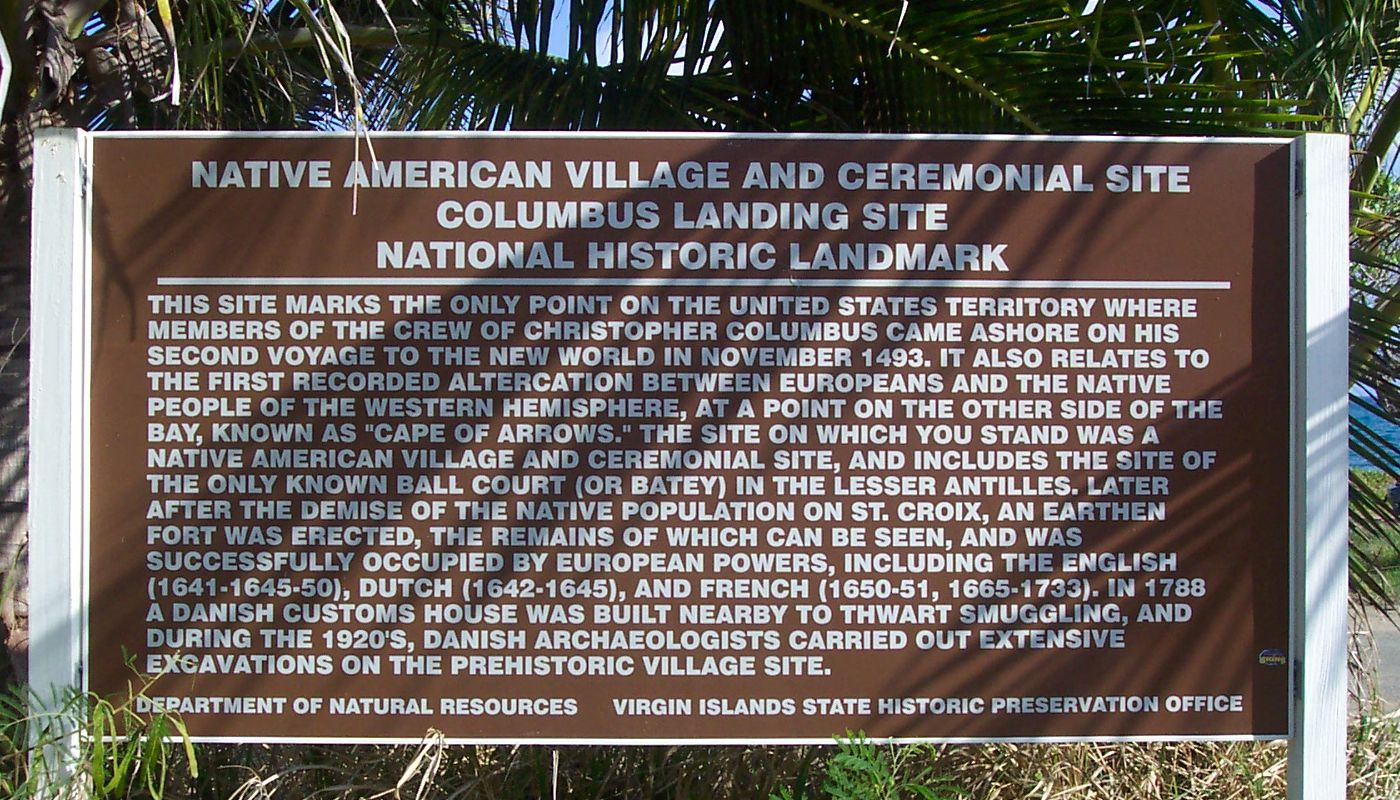
Historical marker

Salt River Bay is located on the north side of the island of St. Croix, on its central coast. The bay is a large inlet with two major sections, the left fed by the Salt River. The park property encompasses substantially all of the land abutting the bay. This area's blend of sea and land holds some of the largest remaining mangrove forests in the Virgin Islands, as well as coral reefs and a submarine canyon. Salt River Bay's natural history, its vitally important ecosystem of mangroves, estuary, coral reefs, and submarine canyon, has witnessed thousands of years of human endeavor. Every major period of human habitation in the Virgin Islands is represented: several South American Indian cultures, the 1493 encounter with Columbus, Spanish extermination of the Caribs, attempts at colonization by a succession of European nations, and enslaved West Africans and their descendants. More than a dozen major archeological investigations since 1880, together with historical research, reveal a remarkable story.

== Park history ==
On February 24, 1992 Congress created the park, under cooperative management of the National Park Service and Government of the Virgin Islands of the United States. These agencies jointly manage this park. As an historic area of the National Park Service, the park was administratively listed on the National Register of Historic Places on the same day. The Columbus landing site had already been designated a National Historic Landmark on October 9, 1960. The Salt River Bay National Historical Park and Ecological Preserve is honored with the 53rd quarter in the America the Beautiful Quarters in 2020.

== Columbus landing site and early history ==
The bay was the location of a Taino village and batey since the 1300s, until conquered by the Caribs in 1425. The Columbus landing site is located on a point at the western side of the bay. It is here that Columbus sent a longboat to shore on November 14, 1493, to explore the area and acquire fresh water and provisions. A nearby village was occupied by Taíno people who had recently been enslaved by invading Carib forces, and Columbus' men took some of the women and children with them when they set out to return to the ship. While en route, they encountered a canoe apparently occupied by Caribs, and a brief skirmish took place, in which one of the canoe's occupants was slain and the others captured. This was the first recorded fight by the Spanish with the New World native population, and they named the site Cabo de la Flecha (Cape of the Arrow).

The island had been abandoned by the Caribs by 1590 (possibly due either to diseases introduced by contact, Spanish massacres, or other causes), and became Spanish territory. It was taken by the English in 1641, and then the Dutch in 1642. The Dutch built triangular earthworks called Fort Flamand (Flemish Fort) near the site, which was taken over by the French in 1650, and renamed Fort Salé (Salt Fort or du Sal Fort after the governor). It remains the only known structure to survive from this early colonial period.

Gudmund Hatt first discovered the site in 1923. Excavations revealed petroglyphs, human sacrifice remains, zemis, and stone belts. Some of the artifacts are now in the National Museum of Denmark.

== Bioluminescent bay ==
Salt River is home to one of two bioluminescent bays or bio bays on the island of St. Croix (a second bio bay can be found at Altona Lagoon). Every year thousands of people flock to see the glowing water of the Bio Bay that's created by a micro-organism, the dinoflagellate Pyrodinium bahamense. The bay is also home to other bioluminescent marine life including Ctenophora or comb-jellies and Odontosyllis phosphorea or fireworms.

Bio Bays are extremely rare with "only seven year-round lagoons known to exist in the Caribbean", says Dr. Michael Latz of the Scripps Institution of Oceanography at the University of California San Diego, an expert on bioluminescent organisms, "Any place that has a bioluminescent bay should cherish it like a natural wonder, like a treasure".

A combination of factors creates the necessary conditions for bioluminescence: red mangrove trees surround the water (the organisms have been related to mangrove forest although mangrove is not necessarily associated with this species). A study at the Bio Bay located at Salt River Bay National Historical Park and Ecological Preserve is being conducted by faculty and students from the University of South Carolina, the University of North Carolina Wilmington and the University of the Virgin Islands. Their research is focused on analyzing quality and nutrient composition of the water, the distribution of the dinoflagellate Pyrodinium bahamense, and the abundance of "cysts," dormant dinoflagellates embedded in the sea floor.

The National Park Service and its partner institutions completed a study of the bioluminescence phenomenon in the Mangrove Lagoon in Spring 2014.

== Scuba diving ==
Salt River Canyon is a prehistoric river and waterfall having cut two deep walls facing each other across a quarter mile of blue water. The feature is one of the best known of St. Croix's dive features, along with the Frederiksted Pier. The most popular scuba diving locations are a few hundred yards outside the Salt River Bay. Although most of the boat moorings are 25-45' deep, the actual canyon reaches nearly 500' in depth. Recreational scuba limits are 130' and well into the shadows of the canyon walls. This location is known for its sheer depth, clarity, and wildlife. February and March play host to nursing humpback whales. Year-round are both the nurse shark and reef shark. Occasionally one of the pods of dolphins may come swimming by as well. Sport Diver Magazine has also rated this area as one of the top 5 for water clarity in the Caribbean.

== See also ==
- Hispanic Heritage Sites (U.S. National Park Service)
- List of United States National Historic Landmarks in United States commonwealths and territories, associated states, and foreign states
- National Register of Historic Places listings in the United States Virgin Islands
