= Hans Henrik Berg =

Danish colonial administrator, landowner and planter

Hans Hendrik Berg (1789 – 1862) was a Danish colonial administrator, landowner and planter who served as governor of the Danish West Indies in 1848 and again from 1853 to 1862. The Jossie Gut Historic District, included in Virgin Islands National Park on Saint John, U.S. Virgin Islands, is the site of his sugar plantation which he owned from 1820 on. "Hans Henrik Berg (born 1789, died 1862, private archives no. 6783, 1 box), consist of documents concerning the Lilienskiold family’s claim on the sugar plantations Liliendahl and Marienhøj on St. Thomas around 1845. Berg was vice-governor and legal adviser to the family."
