= Estate Niesky =

- U.S. National Register of Historic Places
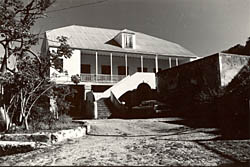

- Location within the U.S. Virgin Islands
- Location: Saint Thomas, U.S. Virgin Islands
- Coordinates: 18°20′18″N 64°57′08″W
- Area: 12.2 acres (4.9 ha)
- NRHP reference No.: 78003092
- Added to NRHP: 1978

The property known as Estate Niesky was purchased in 1755 by the Moravian Church in Charlotte Amalie, during the era when America's original Thirteen Colonies were still part of the British Empire. The United States would not take possession of the islands until March 31, 1917, at which time Denmark sold the islands for the sum of $25,000,000 in United States gold coin.

The Moravian Church saw its 1755 acquisition of the estate as a way to supplement its mission at the New Herrnhut Moravian Church in what is now eastern Saint Thomas, U.S. Virgin Islands. The church had been established at Charlotte Amalie for decades when they decided to branch out. Moravian Church bishop Nicolaus Zinzendorf directed Augustus Gottlieb Spangenberg to establish missions in the Netherlands Caribbean colonies. Records discovered during the United States National Register of Historic Places listings assessment give evidence that the original plantation church building was constructed in 1771.

During this era, the Danish West India Company introduced the practice of using enslaved persons to work the sugar plantations. Estate Niesky also used Moravian slaves, but trained them as skilled artisans. Denmark's emancipation of the slaves occurred in 1848.

A new mission house was completed and occupied on July 17, 1829. The old 1771 church building was demolished and a new one consecrated in October 1858. Hurricanes destroyed the new church in both 1867 and 1871, and each time island residents rebuilt the church over its old foundation. The remains of stone walls dividing the site into planting plots are all that survive from the original 1771 plantation, which had been enlarged from the 1755 property. Due to extensive damage during multiple hurricane seasons, the mission had to be rebuilt several times.

Today, the complex consists of a manse, church, slave quarters, a small cemetery and other outbuildings. The manse, now used as a school and offices, was largely rebuilt after a fire in 1971; still, much of the original 1828 structure's exterior remains.

== See also ==
- National Register of Historic Places listings in the United States Virgin Islands
