= Liever Marches Bay =

Liever Marches Bay is a shallow bight on the north shore of the island of St. John, U.S. Virgin Islands, just east of Brown Bay, towards the eastern end of the island. It has a 450 feet (140 m) shingle beach.

== Historic district ==
- Liever Marches Bay Historic District
- U.S. National Register of Historic Places
- U.S. Historic district
- Location within the U.S. Virgin Islands
- Location: East of Brown Bay on St. John, U.S. Virgin Islands
- Coordinates: 18°21′16″N 64°42′04″W
- Area: 4 acres (1.6 ha)
- MPS: Virgin Islands National Park MRA
- NRHP reference No.: 81000087
- Added to NRHP: July 23, 1981

Liever Marches Bay Historic District, east of Brown Bay on the island of Saint John, Virgin Islands, is a historic district which was listed on the National Register of Historic Places in 1981. The listing included three contributing sites. It is located in the central area of Virgin Islands National Park.

It includes all of a smallish triangular flat area behind the beach. It includes ruins of an abattoir which probably served cattle-farming in the Brown Bay plantation and other plantation areas which had completely converted away from sugar cane or other more intensive agriculture. It also includes ruins two water wells with drinking troughs.
