= St. Thomas Synagogue =

Reform synagogue in the US Virgin Islands

- Hebrew: קהילת קודש ברכה ושלום וגמילות חסדים
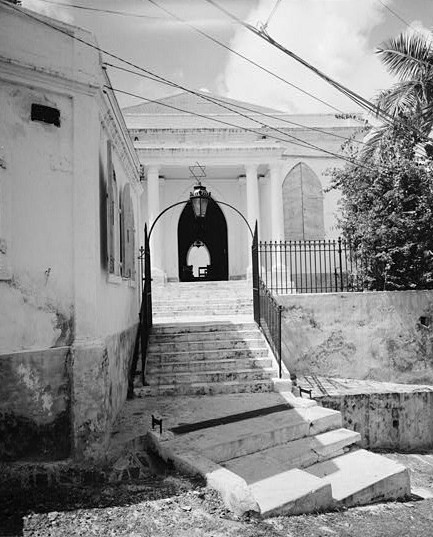
- St. Thomas Synagogue

- Location on the U.S. Virgin Islands

Religion
- Affiliation: Reform Judaism
- Rite: Sephardi
- Ecclesiastical or organisational status: Synagogue
- Leadership: Rabbi Julia Margolis
- Status: Active

Location
- Location: 2116 Crystal Gade, Charlotte Amalie, Saint Thomas, U.S. Virgin Islands 00802
- Country: United States
- Coordinates: 18°20′41″N 64°55′59″W

Architecture
- Style: Greek Revival; Gothic Revival
- Established: 1796 (as a congregation)
- Completed: 1833
- Materials: Rubblestone

Website
- synagogue.vi
- St. Thomas Synagogue
- U.S. National Register of Historic Places
- U.S. National Historic Landmark
- U.S. Historic district – Contributing property
- Area: less than one acre
- Part of: Charlotte Amalie Historic District (ID76001860)
- NRHP reference No.: 97001270

Significant dates
- Added to NRHP: September 25, 1997
- Designated NHL: September 25, 1997
- Designated CP: July 19, 1976

St. Thomas Synagogue, officially Congregation Beracha Veshalom Oogemiluth Hasadim (Hebrew: קהילת קודש ברכה ושלום וגמילות חסדים) or The Hebrew Congregation of St. Thomas, is a historic Reform Jewish synagogue located at 2116 Crystal Gade, Queens Quarters, in Charlotte Amalie on the island of Saint Thomas in the U.S. Virgin Islands. The synagogue building was declared a National Historic Landmark in 1997.

== History ==
The congregation was founded in 1796 by Spanish and Portuguese Sephardic Jews who had come to the Caribbean Basin to finance trade between Europe and the New World. The building was constructed in 1833, and is the second oldest synagogue in the United States (after Touro Synagogue in Newport, Rhode Island built in 1763). As a result of Hurricanes Irma and Maria, Category 5 hurricanes which ravaged much of the Caribbean and St. Thomas in September 2017, the synagogue sustained significant damage, but has remained in continuous operation during this time under the leadership of Rabbi Michael Feshbach.

Since March 2023, the congregation had been led by Rabbi Julia Margolis.

== Description ==
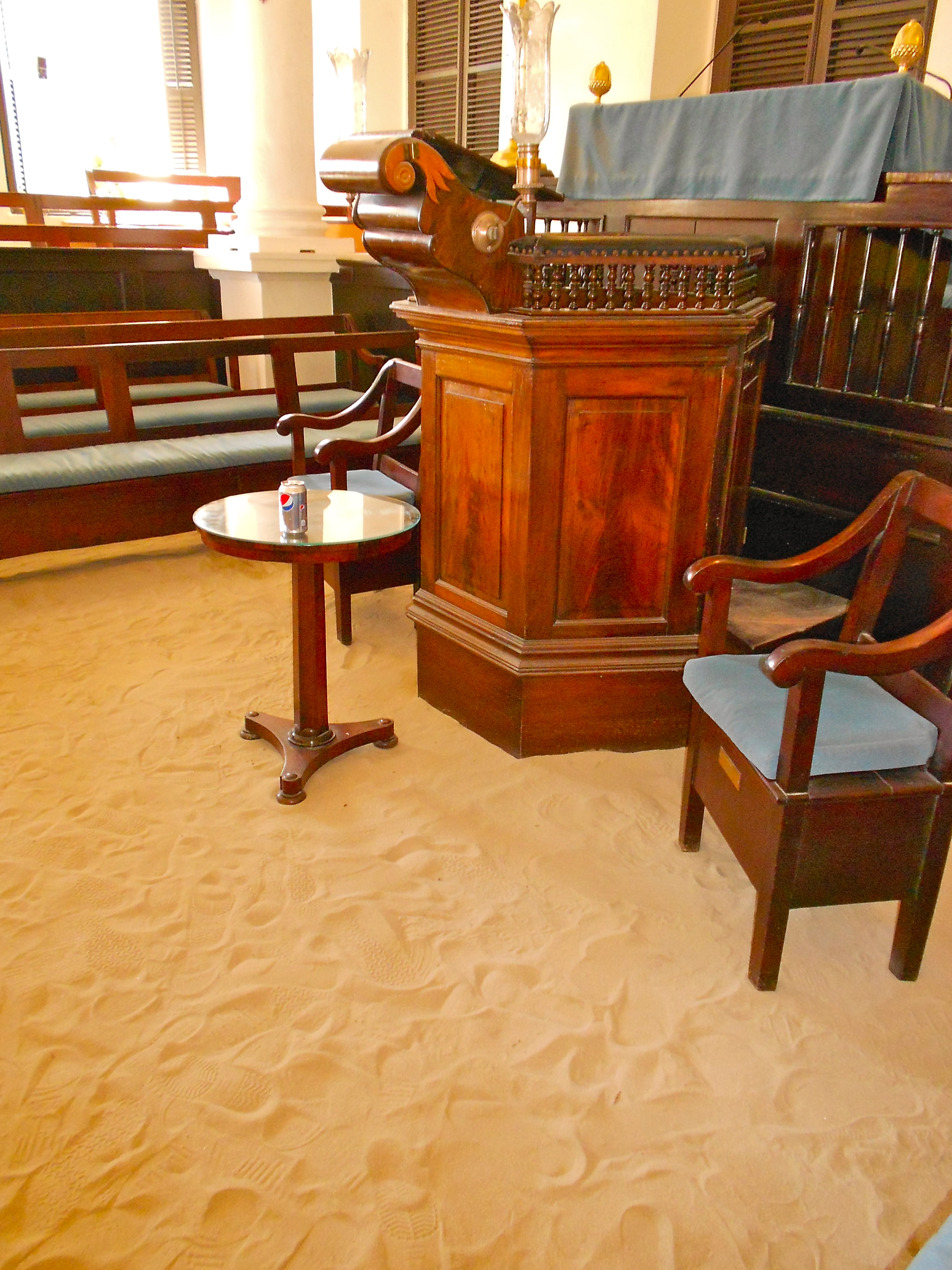
Synagogue interior

The St. Thomas Synagogue stands north of Charlotte Amalie's central business district, on the north side of Crystal Gade near its junction with Raadets Gade. It is a single-story structure, built out of rubblestone joined by a mortar mix of lime, sand, and molasses, and covered by a shallow pitch hip roof. Its front, separated from the street by an entry courtyard, has a Greek Revival temple front, but with Gothic Revival arched window openings. The façade is recessed, with the temple pediment supported by brick pillars with Tuscan styling. On the interior, the Torah ark is located on the east wall, with the bimah on a dais against the west wall. The center of the chamber is demarcated by a square of four Ionic columns mounted on pedestals, and there are rows of bench pews on the north and south walls. The seating areas of men and women are separated by movable wooden partitions.

== See also ==
- List of United States National Historic Landmarks in United States commonwealths and territories, associated states, and foreign states
- National Register of Historic Places listings in the United States Virgin Islands
