= Fortsberg =

- U.S. National Register of Historic Places
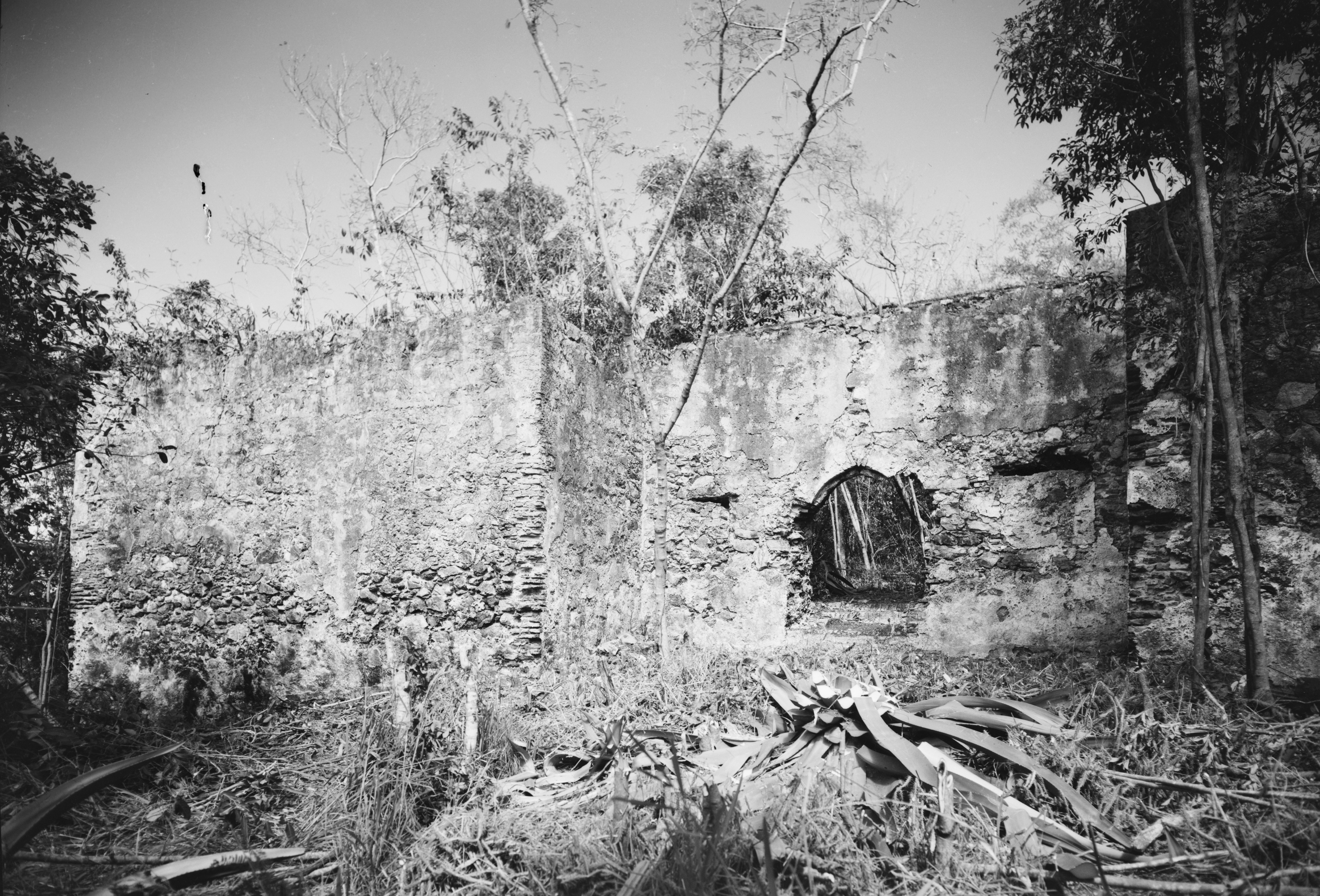

- Location within the U.S. Virgin Islands
- Location: Southeast of Coral Bay, Saint John, U.S. Virgin Islands
- Coordinates: 18.345833°N 64.705556°W
- Area: 101 acres (41 ha)
- Built: 1760
- NRHP reference No.: 76002218
- Added to NRHP: September 1, 1976

Fortsberg, also known as Frederiksvaern, is a fortification overlooking Coral Bay in Saint John, U.S. Virgin Islands. A fort was first built on this site in 1717, however the original fort was demolished, and the current fort was built in 1760. It was listed on the National Register of Historic Places in 1976.

== History ==
The original fort was built in 1717, when settlers moved to the Coral Bay area from St. Thomas. The fort was built using slave labour. The fort can be seen on a 1920 map of Coral Bay. The fort was later seized by slaves in a rebellion on 23 November 1733, and destroyed. The slaves "massacred the garrison and occupied most of the plantations of St. John. The plantation owners fled to Mr. Durlo's plantation, now Caneel Bay, which was fortified and successfully defended. Two attempts by the Danes to supress [sic] the rebellion were unsuccessful. Finally aid was secured from the Governor of Martinique. Four hundred French soldiers encamped near Fortsberg and the rebellion was suppressed after a campaign of six months."

A second fort was constructed in 1760, and it is this fort which is listed today as a historical monument. The listing included two contributing structures and one contributing site. The fort is a 120-by-60-foot (37 m × 18 m) structure with high walls and four bastions, built over ruins of an earlier one dating from 1723. Ruins of an unidentified structure are nearby.

The second structure is the ruins of a supporting shore battery, about 1,000 feet (300 m) southeast of the fort. It has a 37-by-54-foot (11 m × 16 m) interior area. As of 1976, five historic cannons survived in the battery, although without their carriages.

The fort was occupied by British military in 1801 and during 1807 to 1815, during the Napoleonic Wars.

The fort sits at an altitude of 426 feet above sea level.

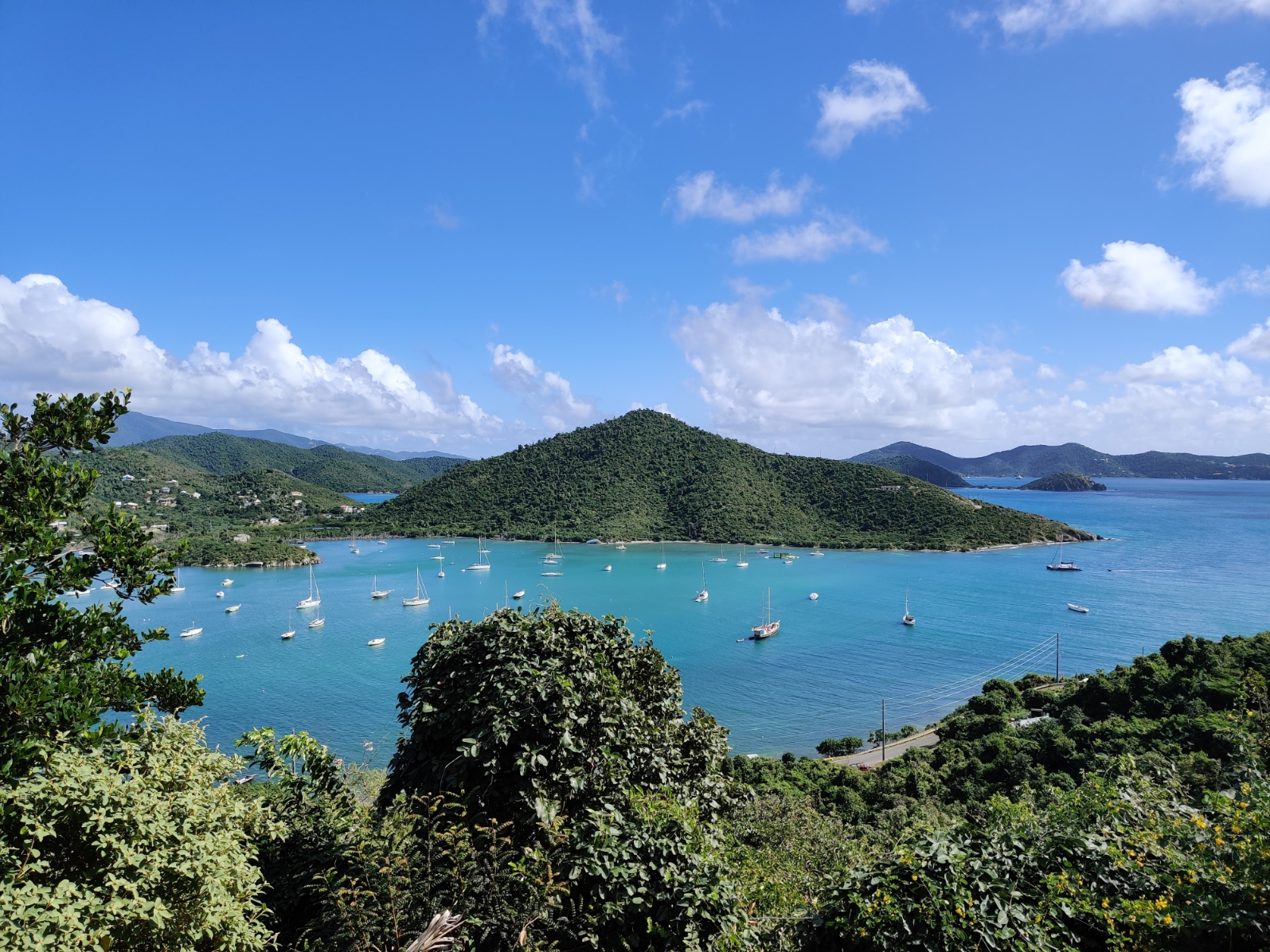
The hill on which Fortsberg is.

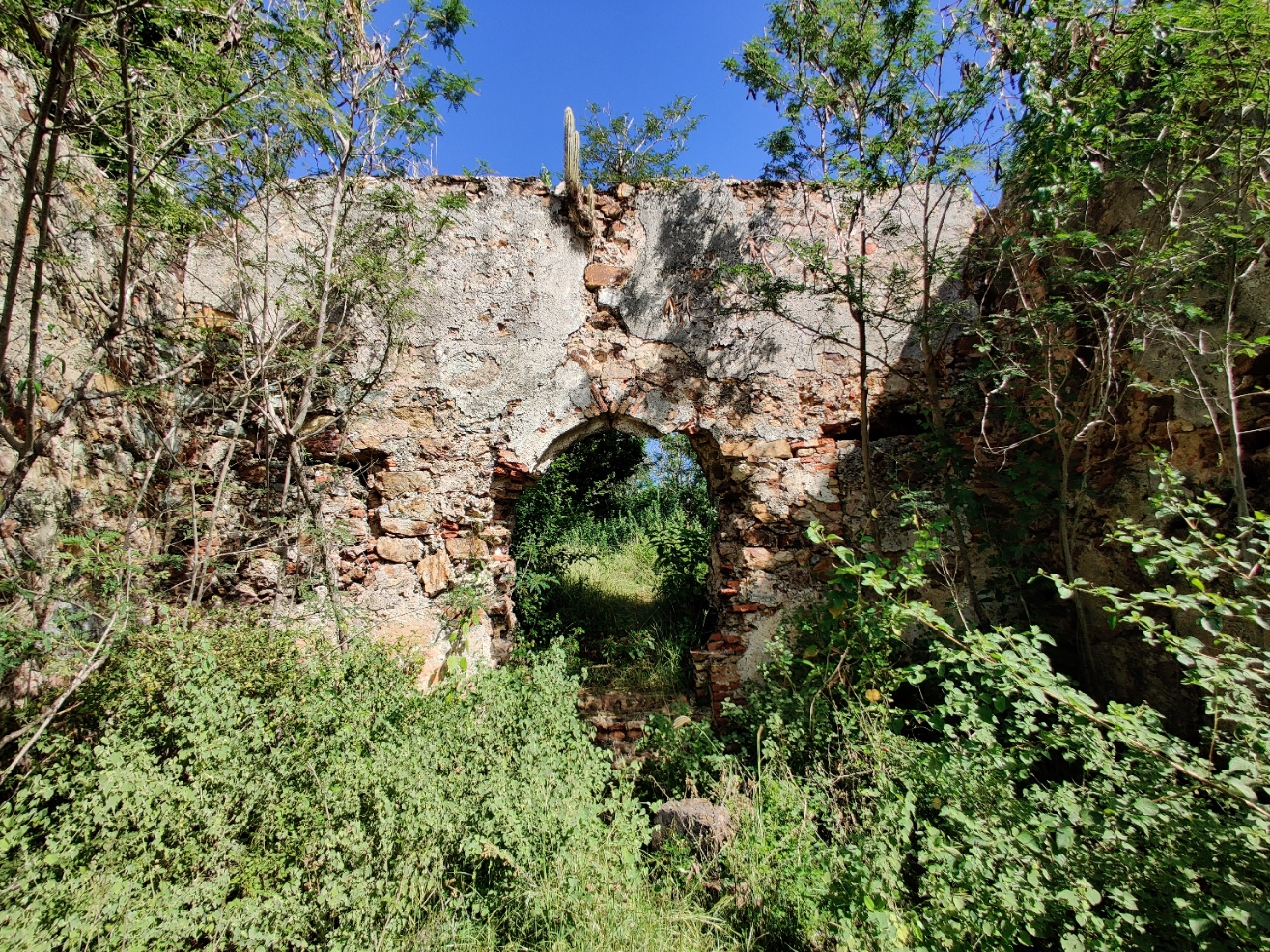
The entrance to Fortsberg.
