= Jossie Gut Historic District =

- U.S. National Register of Historic Places
- U.S. Historic district
- Location within the U.S. Virgin Islands
- Nearest city: Reef Bay, Virgin Islands
- Coordinates: 18°20′32″N 64°44′25″W
- Area: 5 acres (2.0 ha)
- MPS: Virgin Islands National Park MRA
- NRHP reference No.: 81000086
- Added to NRHP: July 23, 1981

The Jossie Gut Historic District, in Reef Bay Valley / Reef Bay, Virgin Islands, was listed on the National Register of Historic Places in 1981. The listing included two contributing structures and four contributing sites. It is included in Virgin Islands National Park. It is located west of Coral Bay off Center Line Road, in the Central area of the park. It includes remains of a horsemill.

It was a sugar plantation and factory owned and operated from 1820 to his death in 1862 by Hans Henrik Berg, who was Governor of St. Thomas, St. John in 1848 and again in 1853–1862.
