= Venus Hill =

- U.S. National Register of Historic Places
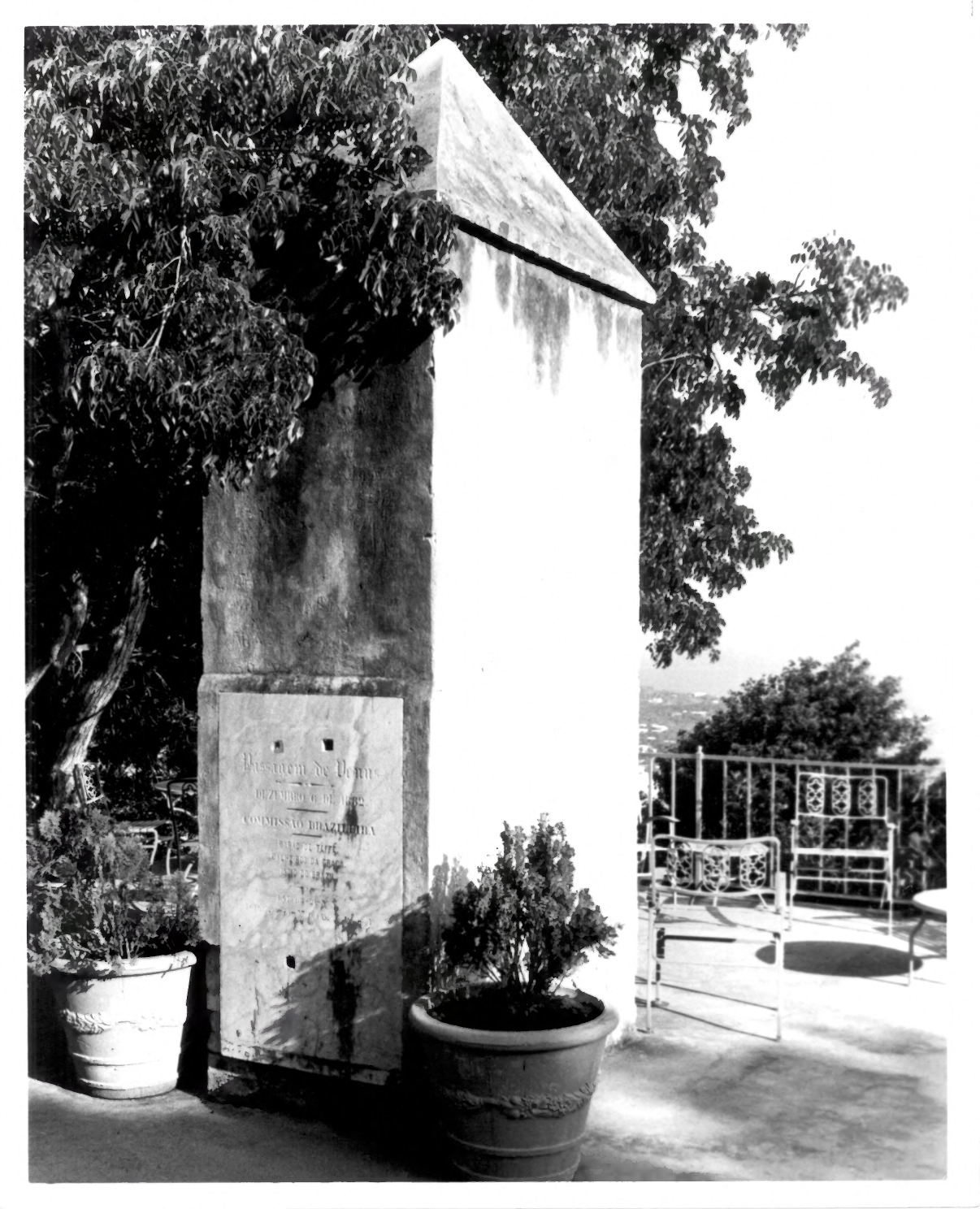

- Location within the U.S. Virgin Islands
- Location: No. 24B Mafolie; Charlotte Amalie, U.S. Virgin Islands
- Coordinates: 18°21′12″N 64°55′46″W
- Area: less than one acre
- NRHP reference No.: 78002733
- Added to NRHP: February 17, 1978

Venus Hill (also known as Venus Pillar or Mafolie Observatory) is a historic site on Estate Mafolie in Charlotte Amalie, U.S. Virgin Islands, marking the spot where, in 1882, a transit of Venus was observed and recorded. The monument was added to the National Register of Historic Places in 1978.

== History ==
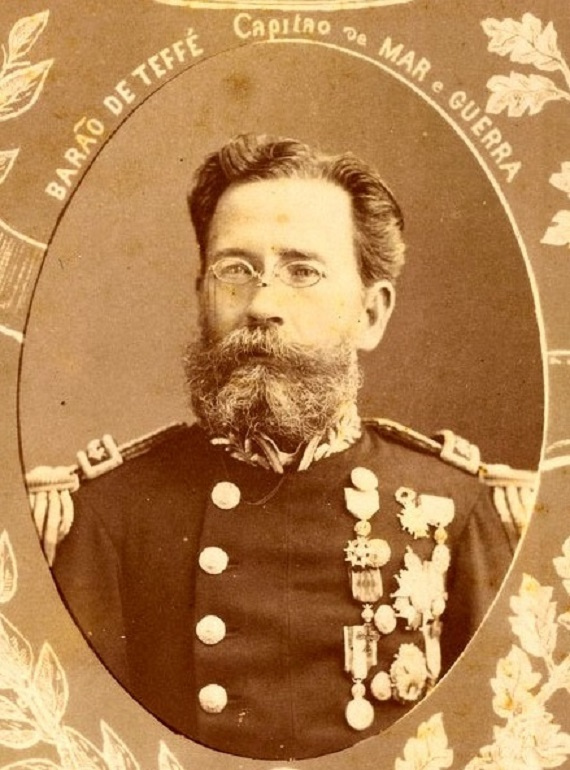
Antonio Luis von Hoonholtz, leader of the expedition

In 1872, a team of astronomers from Brazil began planning an expedition to Saint Thomas to observe the upcoming 1882 transit of Venus, when the planet would pass in front of the Sun. The observatory spot was chosen on a hill on the Estate Mafolie due to its elevation, rising above the city of Charlotte Amalie and allowing an uninterrupted view of the sky. Astronomers that took part in the expedition included Antonio Luis von Hoonholtz, Francisco Calhejros da Graca, and Arthur Indio do Brasil. The results of this expedition were published by the Imperial Observatory of Rio de Janeiro in 1887. During World War I, the hill was used as a gun mount, although no trace of this remains today. Later, an obelisk was constructed to commemorate the site's scientific significance. It is 13.5 feet (4.1 m) tall and built of masonry. The marble tablet that was used as an instrument station during the transit is now used as a plaque, written in Portuguese. For its notability and contribution to the field of astronomy, the site was listed on the National Register of Historic Places in 1978.

== See also ==
- National Register of Historic Places listings in the United States Virgin Islands
