= Diamond School =

- U.S. National Register of Historic Places
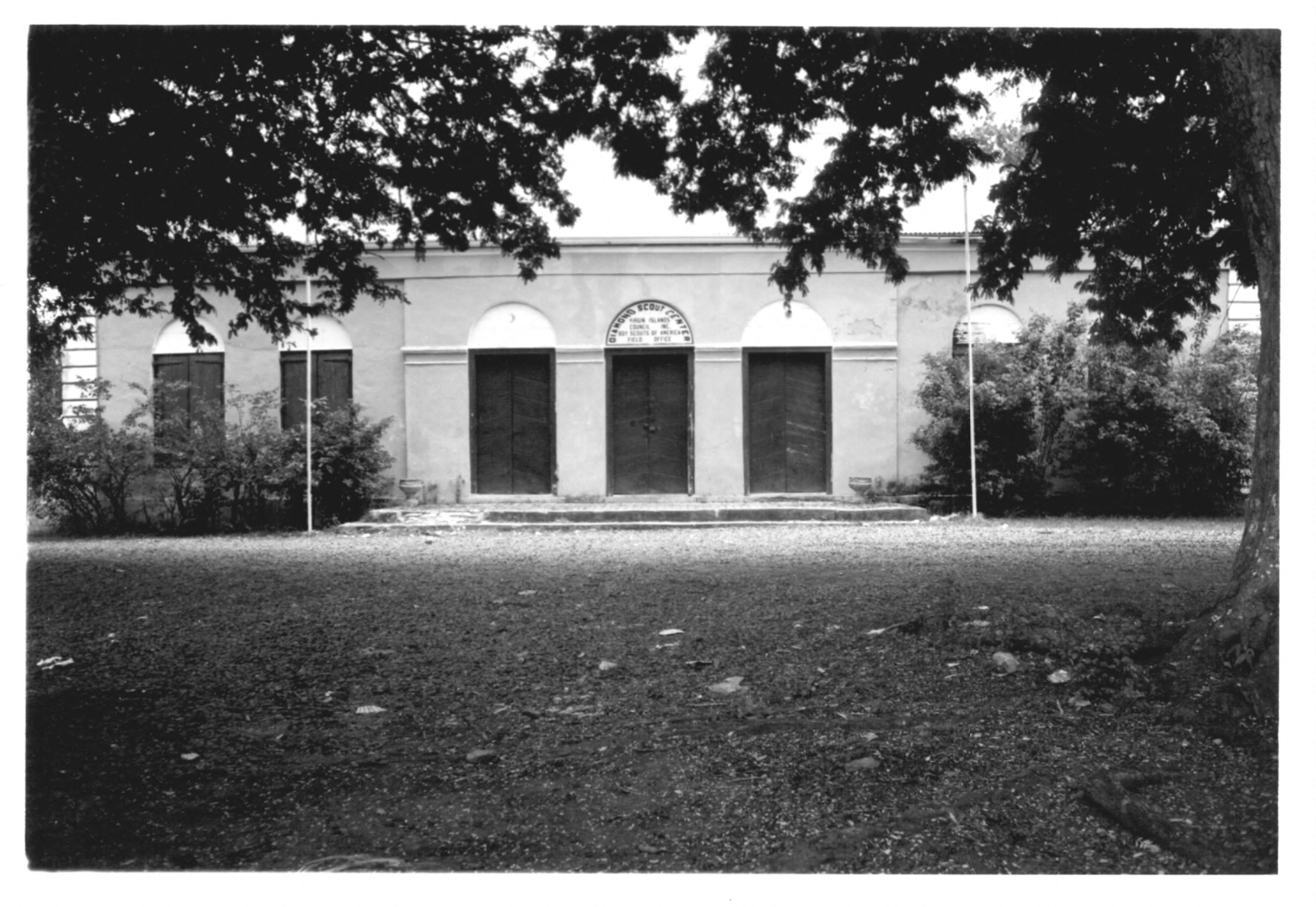

- Location within Saint Croix, U.S. Virgin Islands Location within the U.S. Virgin Islands
- Location: West of Christiansted on Centerline Road, near Christiansted, Virgin Islands
- Coordinates: 17°42′47″N 64°49′47″W
- Area: 0.5 acres (0.20 ha)
- Built: c.1840
- Architect: Albert Løvmand
- Architectural style: Danish classicism
- NRHP reference No.: 76001842
- Added to NRHP: July 1, 1976

The Diamond School near Christiansted, Virgin Islands was built in approximately 1840 and was listed on the National Register of Historic Places in 1976.

It is notable as one of eight "von Scholten schools", which were built by Governor-General Peter von Scholten to improve conditions for slaves. The eight schools were identical and were designed by Albert Løvmand, who studied at Royal Academy of Fine Arts in Copenhagen.

The schools have a single main room, so are essentially one-room schoolhouses.
