= Brown Bay, U.S. Virgin Islands =

- Brown Bay Plantation Historic District
- U.S. National Register of Historic Places
- Location within the U.S. Virgin Islands
- Location: N of Palestina, Saint John, U.S. Virgin Islands
- Coordinates: 18°21′47″N 64°42′25″W
- Area: 30 acres (12 ha)
- MPS: Virgin Islands National Park MRA
- NRHP reference No.: 81000089
- Added to NRHP: July 23, 1981

Brown Bay is a bay and a former sugar cane and cotton plantation in the Virgin Islands National Park on the island of Saint John, U.S. Virgin Islands. It is on the north shore of eastern end of the island, north of the settlement of Palestina.

The bay is a relatively shallow one, rising to a beach. Ruins of the plantation's buildings are behind the beach and upon a hill overlooking the bay. The beach is accessible only by boat or by a trail between Leinster Bay and Hermitage. According to a tourist guide in 2019, arriving hikers will quite likely find the beach empty of any other people.

== Brown Bay Plantation Historic District ==
The Brown Bay Plantation Historic District, is a 30 acres (12 ha) historic district which was listed on the National Register of Historic Places in 1981. The listing included 19 contributing sites.

Behind the beach of Brown Bay are the masonry remains of a large plantation house, a horsemill, and a sugar factory built between 1780 and 1800. On the hill west of the bay are remains of an earlier Great House. The district also includes masonry foundations of two wood frame buildings, four masonry structures, two cabins, three wells with drinking troughs, and two cemeteries.

The plantation began agriculture with sugar production in the late 1700s, after many other sugar cane plantations in the Virgin Islands and plantations elsewhere in the Caribbean had already started, and this was on marginal ground, and was not successful. It shifted to production of cotton and cattle.

It was listed as part of the Virgin Islands National Park MRA.
