= Richmond Prison Detention and Workhouse =

- U.S. National Register of Historic Places
- Location within Saint Croix, U.S. Virgin Islands Location within the U.S. Virgin Islands
- Location: West of Christiansted, Saint Croix, U.S. Virgin Islands
- Coordinates: 17°44′53″N 64°42′45″W
- Area: 4 acres (1.6 ha)
- Built: 1833
- Built by: R. Stewart, Hugh Miller, Albert Lovmand
- Architect: Johannes von Solligen Magens, Albert Lovmand
- NRHP reference No.: 78002720
- Added to NRHP: February 14, 1978

The Richmond Prison Detention and Workhouse, on the island of Saint Croix, U.S. Virgin Islands, was listed on the National Register of Historic Places in 1978. The listing included two contributing buildings and a contributing structure on 4 acres (1.6 ha).

It was designed largely by Johannes von Solligen Magens (1791–1837), with influence by Albert Lovmand, who was the builder of its enclosing walls in 1836.

It served as the Richmond Penitiary, as the state penal institution, until the 1960s.
