= Enighed =

- U.S. National Register of Historic Places
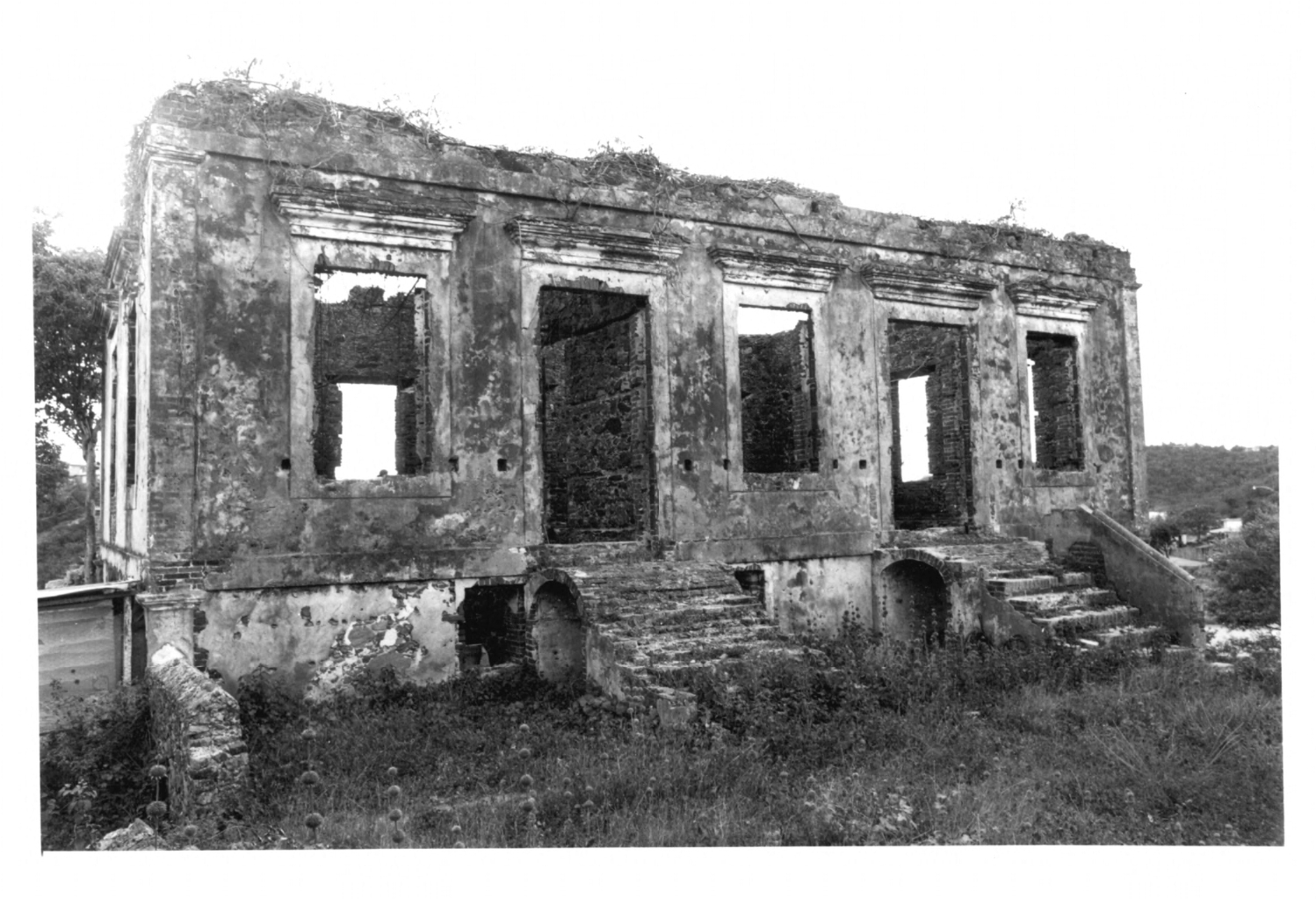

- Location within the U.S. Virgin Islands
- Location: Cruz Bay Quarter, Cruz Bay, Virgin Islands, Saint John, U.S. Virgin Islands
- Coordinates: 18°19′54″N 64°47′30″W
- Area: 0.6 acres (0.24 ha)
- Built: c.1800
- NRHP reference No.: 76002219
- Added to NRHP: July 1, 1976

Enighed, located in the Cruz Bay Quarter on Saint John, U.S. Virgin Islands, was listed on the National Register of Historic Places in 1976.

It is the ruins of the great house of the Enighed sugar plantation, a plantation probably established in the mid-1700s by William Wood (1692-1757). Wood was born on the Dutch island of Saba; his gravestone is to the rear of the great house. The plantation was definitely in the family, in ownership of Johannes Woods, by 1786, and the family owned the plantation until 1821, except for the period of 1787–1797.
