= Lind Point Fort =

- U.S. National Register of Historic Places
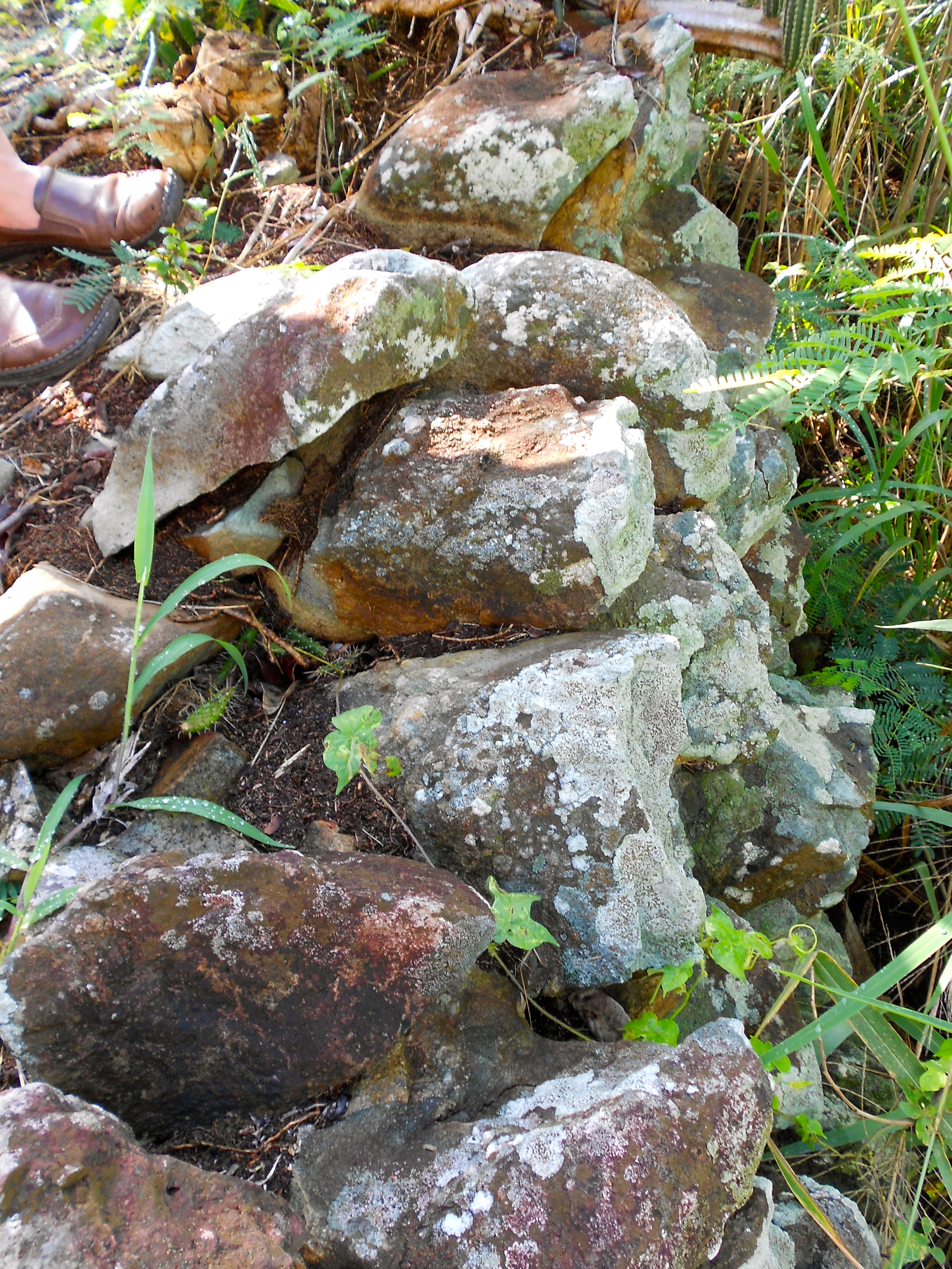

- Location within the U.S. Virgin Islands
- Location: Northwest of Cruz Bay, Saint John, U.S. Virgin Islands
- Coordinates: 18°20′12″N 64°47′52″W
- Area: 2 acres (0.81 ha)
- Built: 1807
- MPS: Virgin Islands National Park MRA
- NRHP reference No.: 81000085
- Added to NRHP: July 23, 1981

Lind Point Fort, located northwest of Cruz Bay on Saint John, U.S. Virgin Islands, is a historic site which was listed on the National Register of Historic Places in 1981.

It was built by the British as a battery site, commanding Cruz Bay, during the Napoleonic Wars. The site includes a semi-circular earthwork ruin. It is protected within a National Park.
