= More Hill Historic District =

- U.S. National Register of Historic Places
- U.S. Historic district
- Location within the U.S. Virgin Islands
- Nearest city: East End, Virgin Islands
- Coordinates: 18°21′40″N 64°41′37″W
- Area: 6 acres (2.4 ha)
- MPS: Virgin Islands National Park MRA
- NRHP reference No.: 81000092
- Added to NRHP: July 23, 1981

The More Hill Historic District in the East End area of Saint John in the U.S. Virgin Islands, was listed on the National Register of Historic Places in 1981.

It is a 6 acres (2.4 ha) historic district which included three contributing sites, and is located off East End Road.

It includes remains of More Hill Plantation, which was a cotton plantation, and is located within Virgin Islands National Park. It has also been known as Mt. Pleasant.

The plantation was established sometime between 1780 and 1800.

The site was deemed "significant for its remains of a modest cotton plantation of the late 18th century unaltered and disturbed by later development and different uses."
