= Friedensfeld Midlands Moravian Church and Manse =

- U.S. National Register of Historic Places
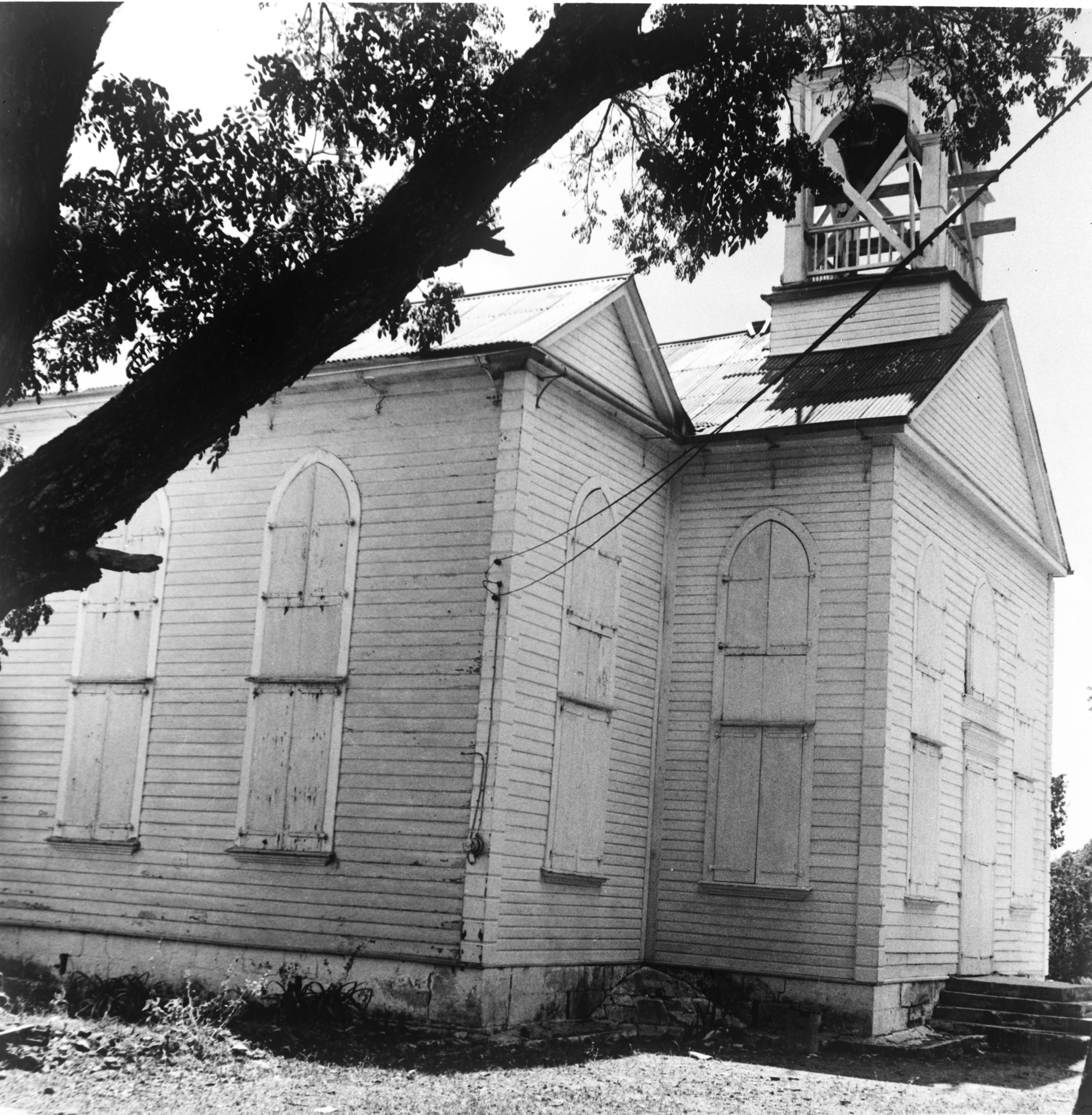
- Moravian Church, Friedensfeld, St. Croix

- Location within Saint Croix, U.S. Virgin Islands Location within the U.S. Virgin Islands
- Nearest city: Christiansted, Virgin Islands
- Coordinates: 17°44′52″N 64°46′50″W
- Area: 4 acres (1.6 ha)
- Built: 1819, 1854
- Architectural style: Classical Revival, Late Gothic Revival, Moravian church style
- NRHP reference No.: 76001844
- Added to NRHP: July 1, 1976

The Friedensfeld Midlands Moravian Church and Manse are historic buildings in Christiansted, Saint Croix, Virgin Islands.

== History ==
The present church building was built in 1854, replacing a structure that had been dedicated on February 12, 1819. The 4 acres (1.6 ha) property, with its two contributing buildings, was added to the National Register of Historic Places on July 1, 1976. It has an associated cemetery.

The two-story church, with its central section about 55 by 77 feet (17 m × 23 m) in plan, was one of the largest wood-frame structures in the U.S. Virgin Islands, and was deemed to be "significant for its unusual combination of combination of Carpenter's Gothic and Classical Revival elements.

The church may have been prefabricated in Germany and assembled by German craftsmen plus local builders.

The manse building is about 70 by 42 feet (21 m × 13 m) in plan, and is connected to the church by a stone pathway. It was built in c.1810.

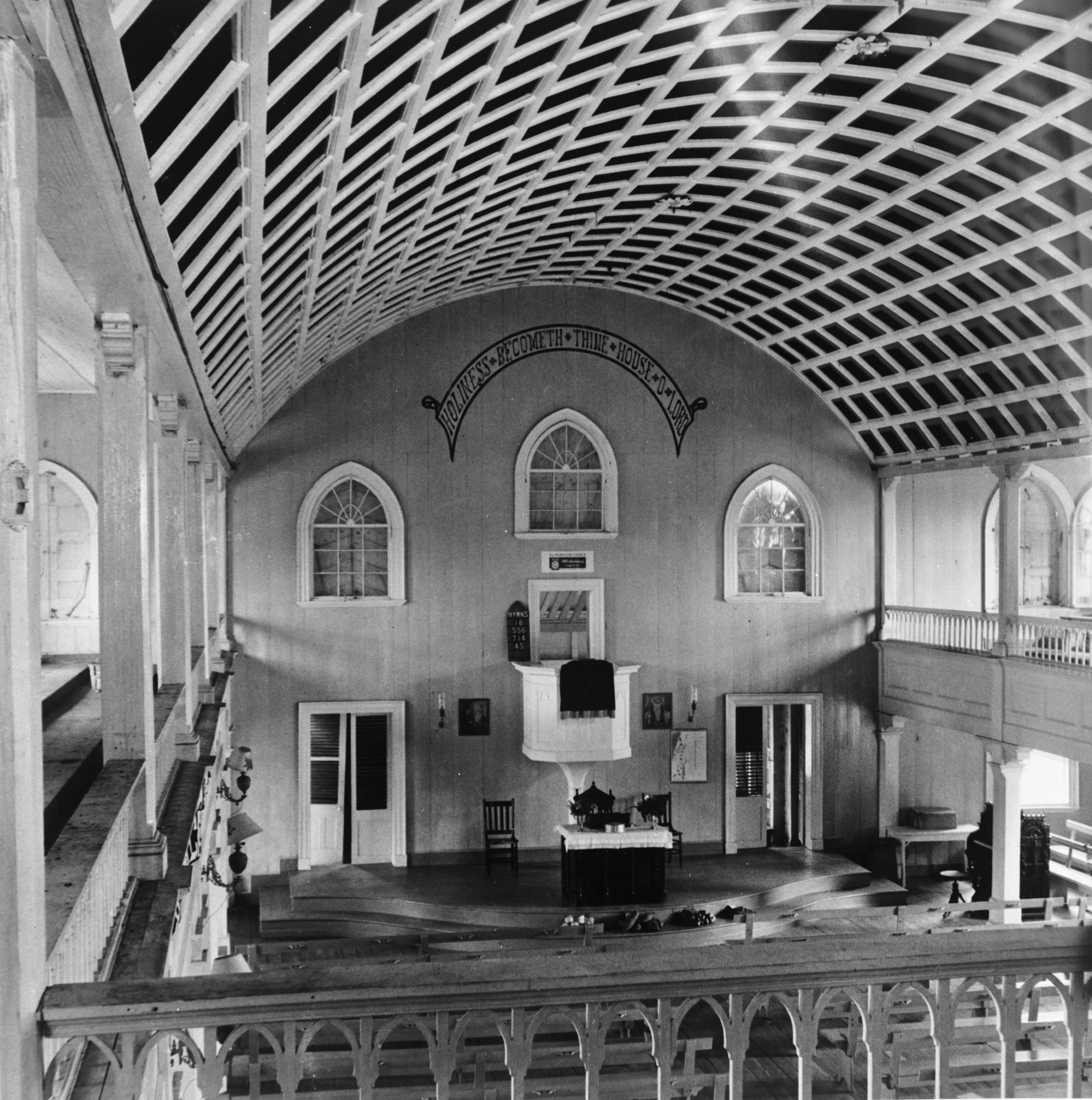
General interior view of the nave

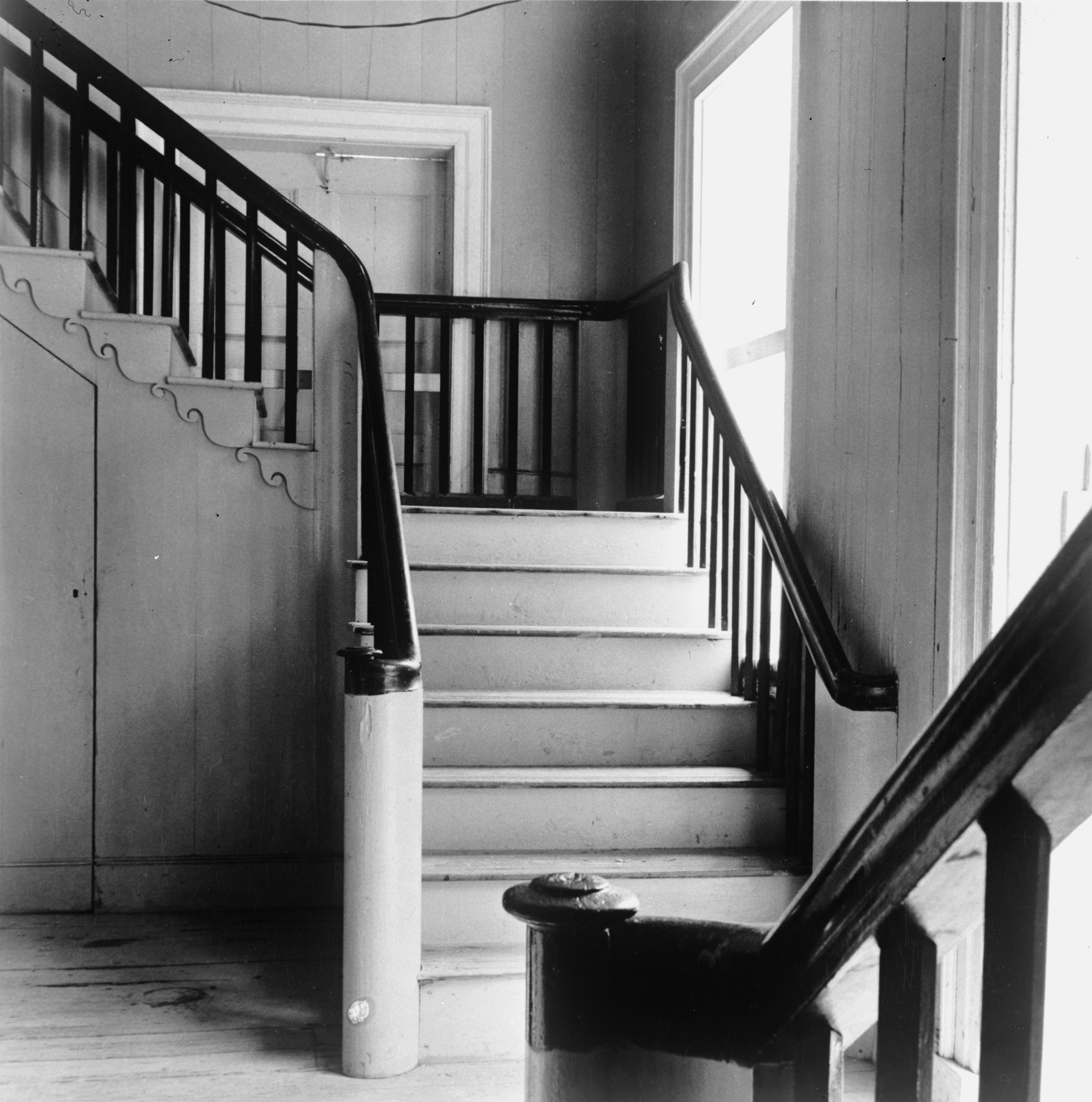
South stair to the balcony

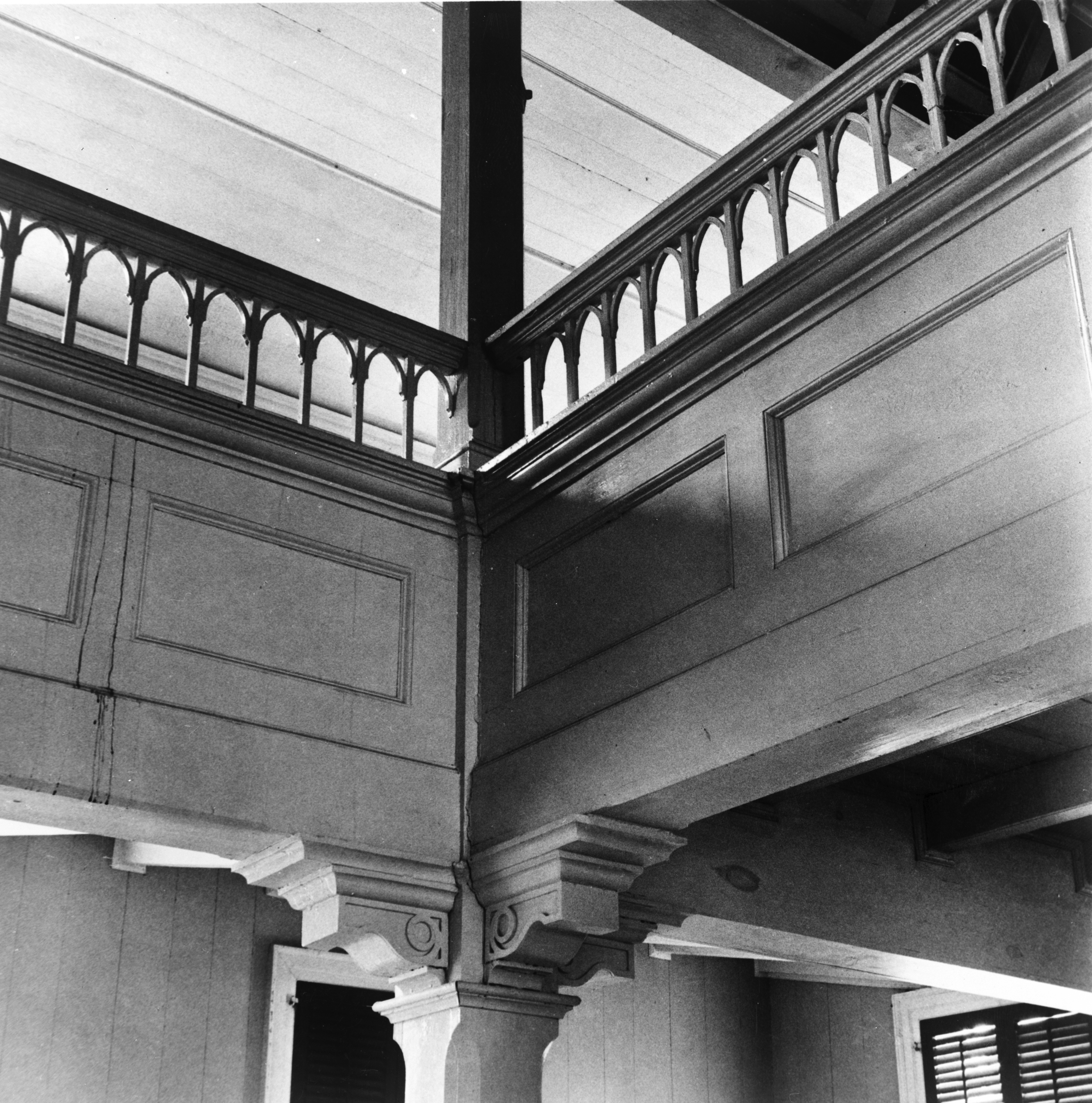
Railing of balcony

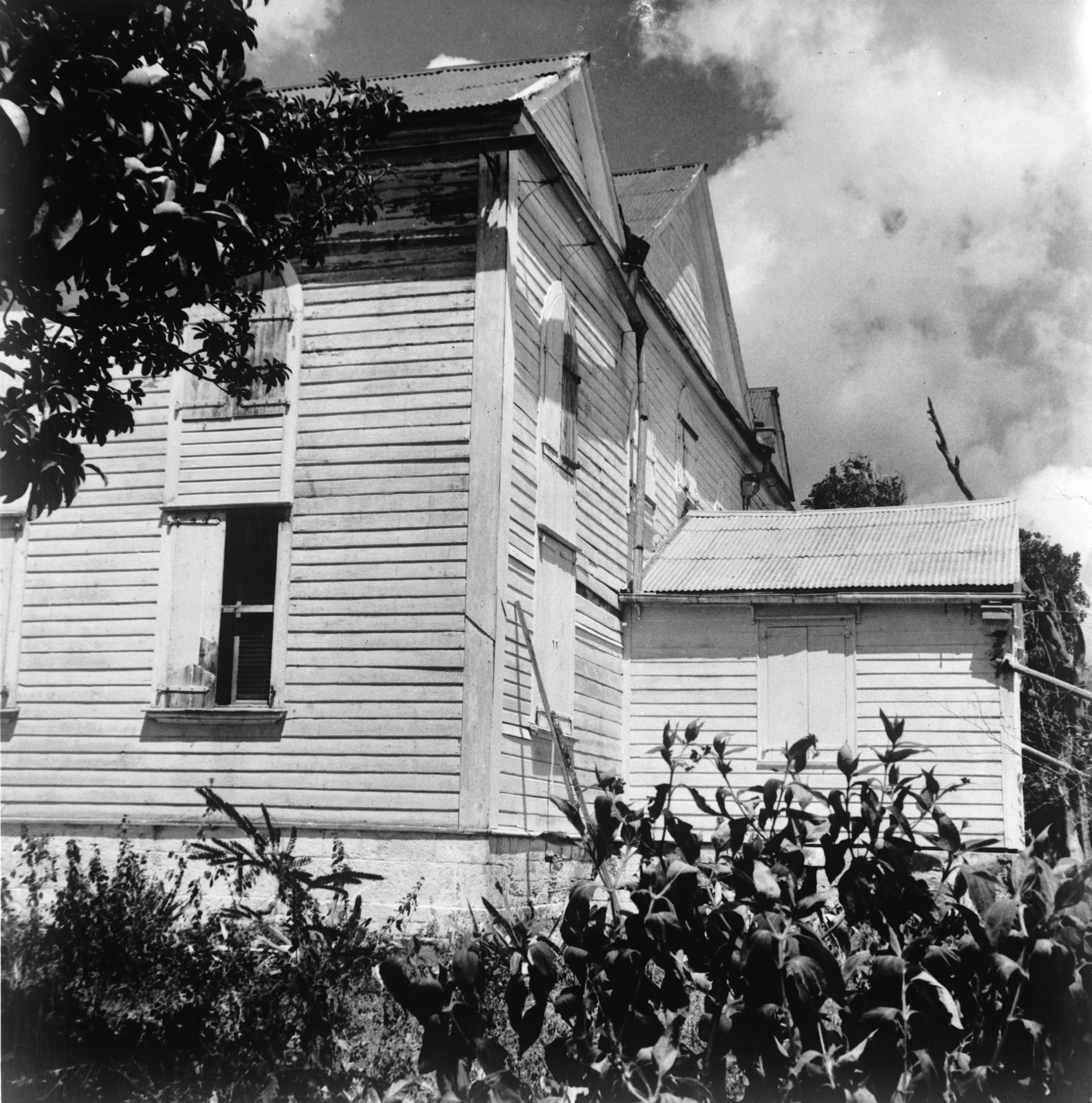
East gable with projeting sacristy
