= Dennis Bay Historic District =

- U.S. National Register of Historic Places
- U.S. Historic district
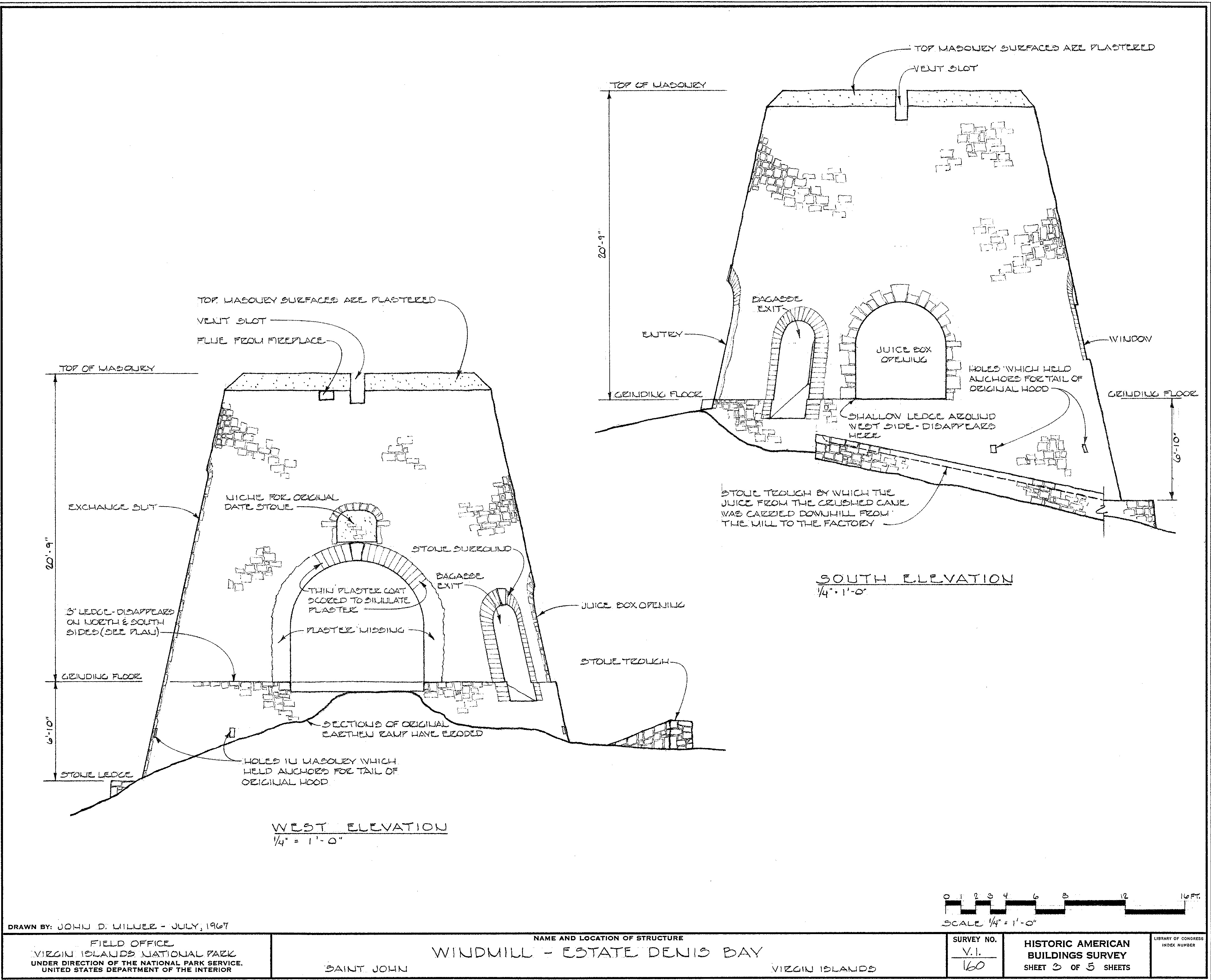
- Windmill plan

- Location within the U.S. Virgin Islands
- Location: NE of Cruz Bay off North Shore Rd., Virgin Islands National Park
- Coordinates: 18.352285°N 64.775415°W
- Area: 20 acres (8.1 ha)
- Built: 1728
- MPS: Virgin Islands National Park MRA
- NRHP reference No.: 81000095
- Added to NRHP: July 23, 1981

Dennis Bay Historic District is a historic district which was listed on the National Register of Historic Places in 1981. It is located northeast of Cruz Bay off North Shore Rd., in Virgin Islands National Park. The plantation was claimed and cleared by 1728 to operate as a sugar cane plantation.
