= Estate Hafensight =

- U.S. National Register of Historic Places
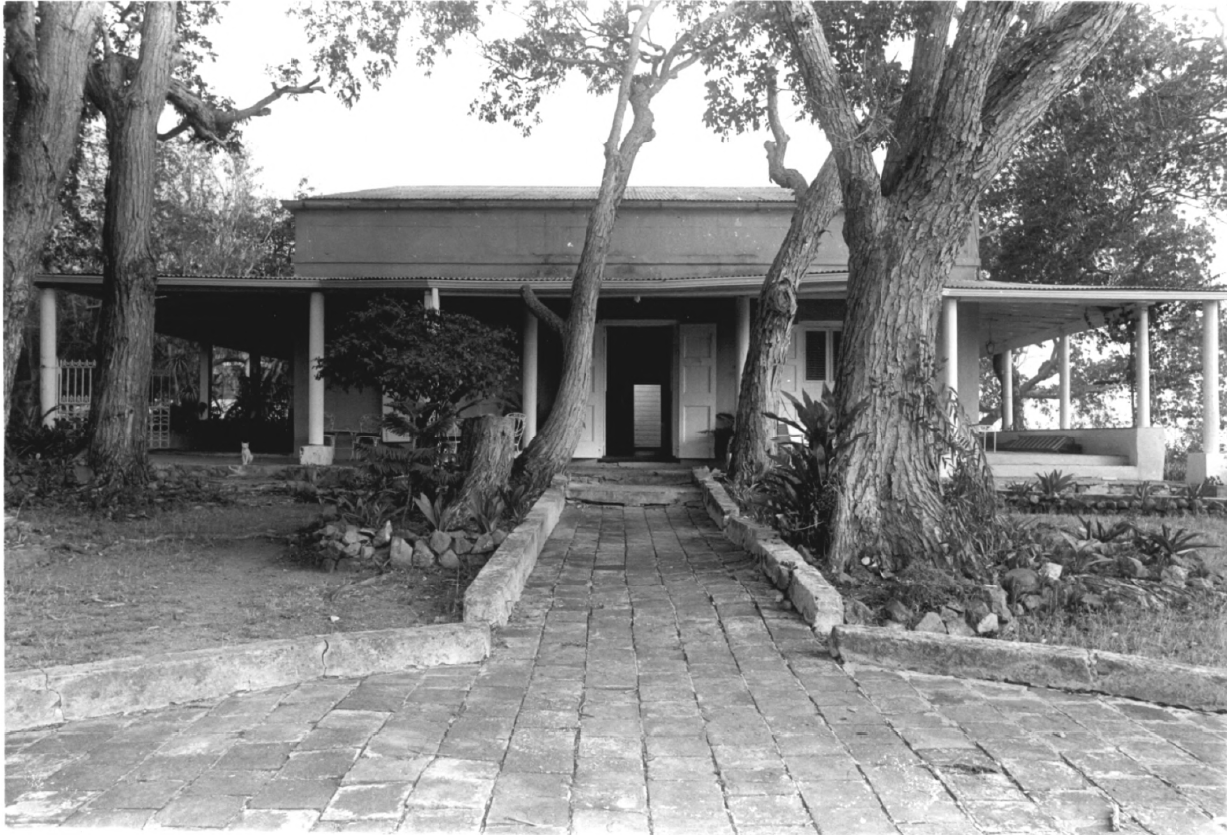

- Location within the U.S. Virgin Islands
- Location: South of Charlotte Amalie on Saint Thomas, U.S. Virgin Islands
- Coordinates: 18°19′55″N 64°55′20″W
- Area: 0.94 acres (0.38 ha)
- Built: 1812
- NRHP reference No.: 78002728
- Added to NRHP: February 17, 1978

Estate Hafensight, also known as Havensight, located south of Charlotte Amalie on Saint Thomas, U.S. Virgin Islands, was listed on the National Register of Historic Places in 1978. It is one mile (1.6 km) across Long Bay from Charlotte Amalie.

== Background ==
The listing includes Havensight Great House, a 40 by 40 feet (12 m × 12 m) one-story site on a high basement, with a terrace. It consists of a large cistern, a tenant house built on the foundations of former slave quarters, a cookhouse, ruins of a bake oven, and more.
