= Estate Botany Bay =

- U.S. National Register of Historic Places
- Location within the U.S. Virgin Islands
- Nearest city: Charlotte Amalie, Virgin Islands
- Coordinates: 18°21′37″N 65°01′53″W
- Area: 3 acres (1.2 ha)
- Built: c.1800
- NRHP reference No.: 76001861
- Added to NRHP: July 30, 1976

Estate Botany Bay, near Charlotte Amalie on Saint Thomas in the U.S. Virgin Islands, was listed on the National Register of Historic Places in 1976.

It has the ruins of a sugar cane factory built probably around 1800, and outbuildings, on a bluff above Botany Bay. It has "unusual fortress-like massing, fine proportions and dramatic siting", and is one of few sugar cane factories surviving on St. Thomas.

It is a two-story 75 by 30 feet (22.9 m × 9.1 m) structure, with a 18 by 32 feet (5.5 m × 9.8 m) one-story central projection. It is built of red ballast brick, rubble masonry and local brain coral, with walls 3 feet (0.91 m) thick. Indications are that it was originally stuccoed and had a timber frame and a gabled roof.

The first documented transaction for it was on January 17, 1810, when, after James Murphy's death, Elizabeth Murphy deeded it to William Punnett and Edward C. Murphy. Estate and debt sales followed in 1814, 1816 and 1818, and in 1827 it was sold, along with neighboring Fortuna by William Punnett to William Ackers Esq., an attorney of the Liverpool firm of Falkner and Mandsley, towards liquidating Punnett's debts. The sale included 29 male slaves, 22 women, 10 boys, and eight girls, as well as livestock of 23 mules, eight asses, and 15 horned cattle. The lot was then immediately sold by Ackens to Robert Flemming Esq. of St. Thomas for $36,000. It was later sold in 1878 for just $900 (~$30,026 in 2025), reflecting deterioration.

It is located in the west-end quarter of Charlotte Amalie, and is in fact at the farthest point west on the island.
