= Estate St. John =

- U.S. National Register of Historic Places
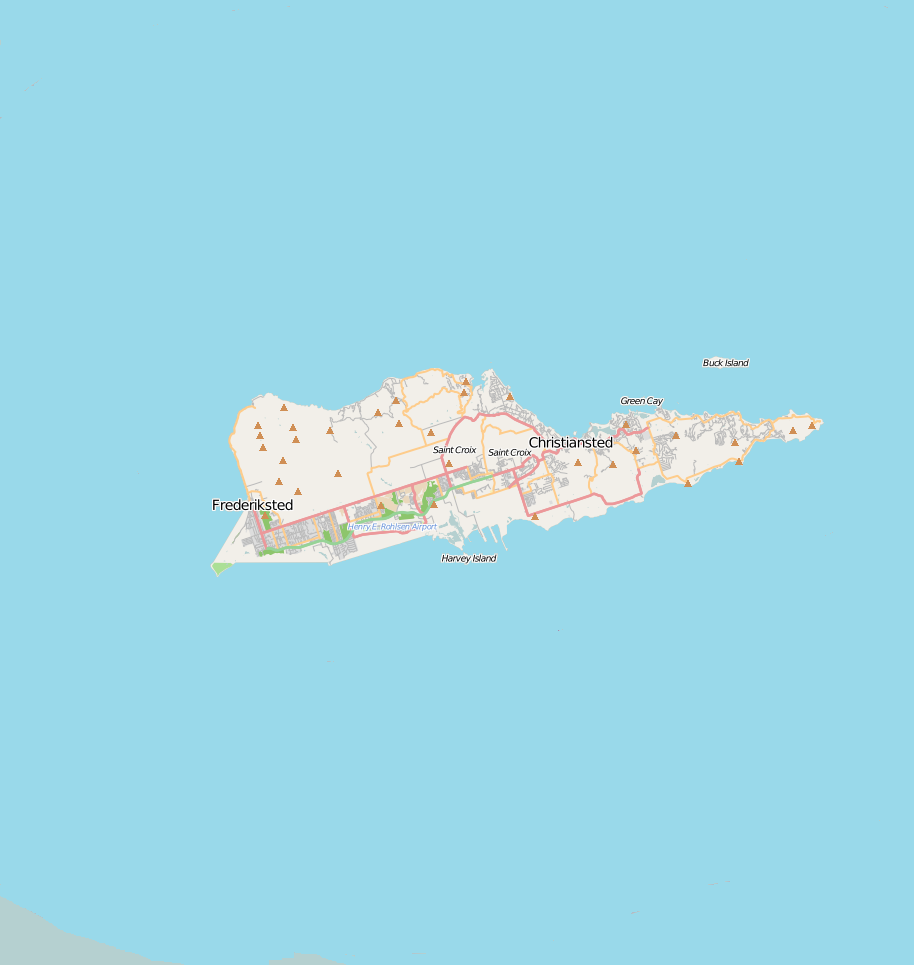
- Location within Saint Croix, US Virgin Islands Location within the U.S. Virgin Islands
- Nearest city: Christiansted, Virgin Islands
- Coordinates: 17°45′57″N 64°44′48″W
- Area: 2.2 acres (0.89 ha)
- Built: c.1810
- NRHP reference No.: 78002718
- Added to NRHP: June 9, 1978

Estate St. John, near Christiansted on Saint Croix in the United States Virgin Islands, was listed on the National Register of Historic Places in 1978. It has also been known as St. Jan Plantage. The listing included two contributing buildings and a contributing structure.

The property was once owned by Colonel Charles Pym Burts and known as Pym Burst Plantage. The plantation was burned but not destroyed during the St. Croix Labor Riots in 1878.

The property includes the former Great House, a cookhouse, and a bell tower. The Great House, built around 1810, is a one-story building on a high foundation, with seven bays on the front and four on the sides.

The cookhouse is a gable-roofed 40 by 17 feet (12.2 m × 5.2 m) three by two bay building with a "massive" chimney and an "exceptional" beehive oven. Coral block walls support its wood-framed roof.

It is located 3 miles (4.8 km) west or northwest of Christiansted. The associated historic sugar factory complex, across a road and greatly altered, was deemed to no longer merit historic designation.
