= Palestina, U.S. Virgin Islands =

Palestina
- Settlement
- Location within the U.S. Virgin Islands
- Coordinates: 18°20′56″N 64°42′24″W

Palestina is a settlement on the island of St. John in the United States Virgin Islands. It is located in the east of the island on the coast of Coral Bay, to the east of the town of Coral Bay.

Just west of the community is the Emmaus Moravian Church and Manse, listed on the National Register of Historic Places.
