= Estate Perseverance =

- U.S. National Register of Historic Places
- Location within the U.S. Virgin Islands
- Nearest city: Charlotte Amalie, Virgin Islands
- Coordinates: 18°21′18″N 64°59′51″W
- Area: 2 acres (0.81 ha)
- Built: by 1811
- NRHP reference No.: 78002730
- Added to NRHP: February 17, 1978

Estate Perseverance, near Charlotte Amalie on Saint Thomas in the U.S. Virgin Islands, was listed on the National Register of Historic Places in 1978. The listing included a contributing building and a contributing site on 2 acres (0.81 ha).

It is located about 4.5 miles (7.2 km) west of Charlotte Amalie, on the southern shoreline of Saint Thomas, about 800 yards (730 m) inland from Perseverance Bay.

The earliest available record shows it was owned by a Mrs. Mary Fogerty in 1811.

It includes a T-shaped one-story sugar factory building built upon a high cellar, with its larger section being about 29 by 73.5 feet (8.8 m × 22.4 m) in dimension. It once had a timber hipped roof. It includes Classical Revival details.
