= Coral Bay, U.S. Virgin Islands =

Town and subdistrict in the U.S. Virgin Islands

Coral Bay
- Subdistrict and Census-Designated Place
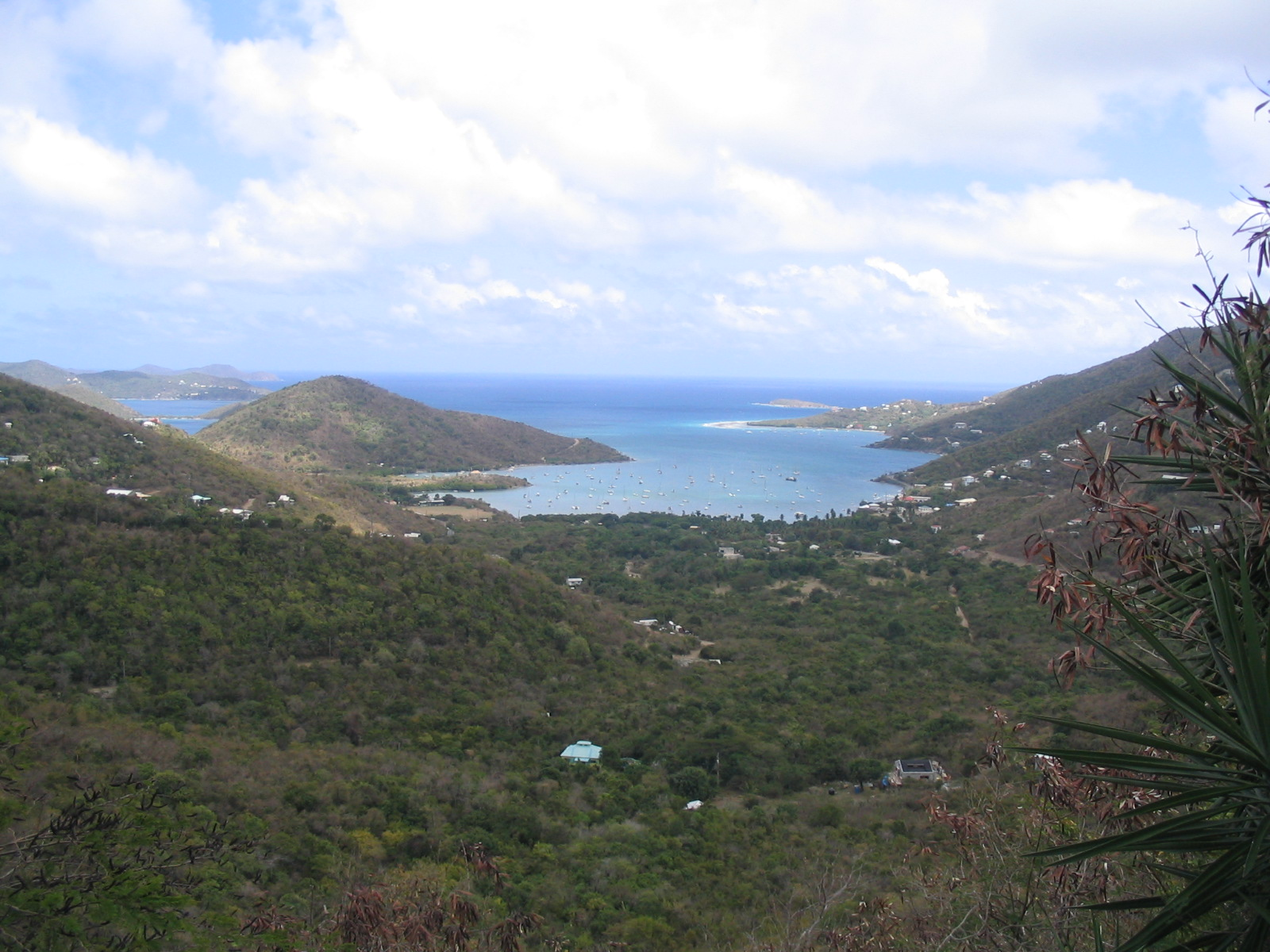
- Coral Bay in St John, U.S. Virgin Islands.

- Location within the United States Virgin Islands
- Coordinates: 18°21′N 64°43′W
- Country: United States
- Territory: U.S. Virgin Islands
- District: Saint John

Population (2010)
  - Total: 634

Coral Bay is a town and a sub-district on the island of St. John in the United States Virgin Islands. It is located on the southeastern side of the island. It was the commercial center of the island in the 19th century as the site of the largest plantation, but from the 1950s onward the population dwindled as the Cruz Bay side of the island with its airport and ferry service to St. Thomas became the gateway to the Virgin Islands National Park. Today Coral Bay is a thriving small community with small outdoor restaurants, grocery stores, businesses and tourism services.

== 8 Tuff Miles ==
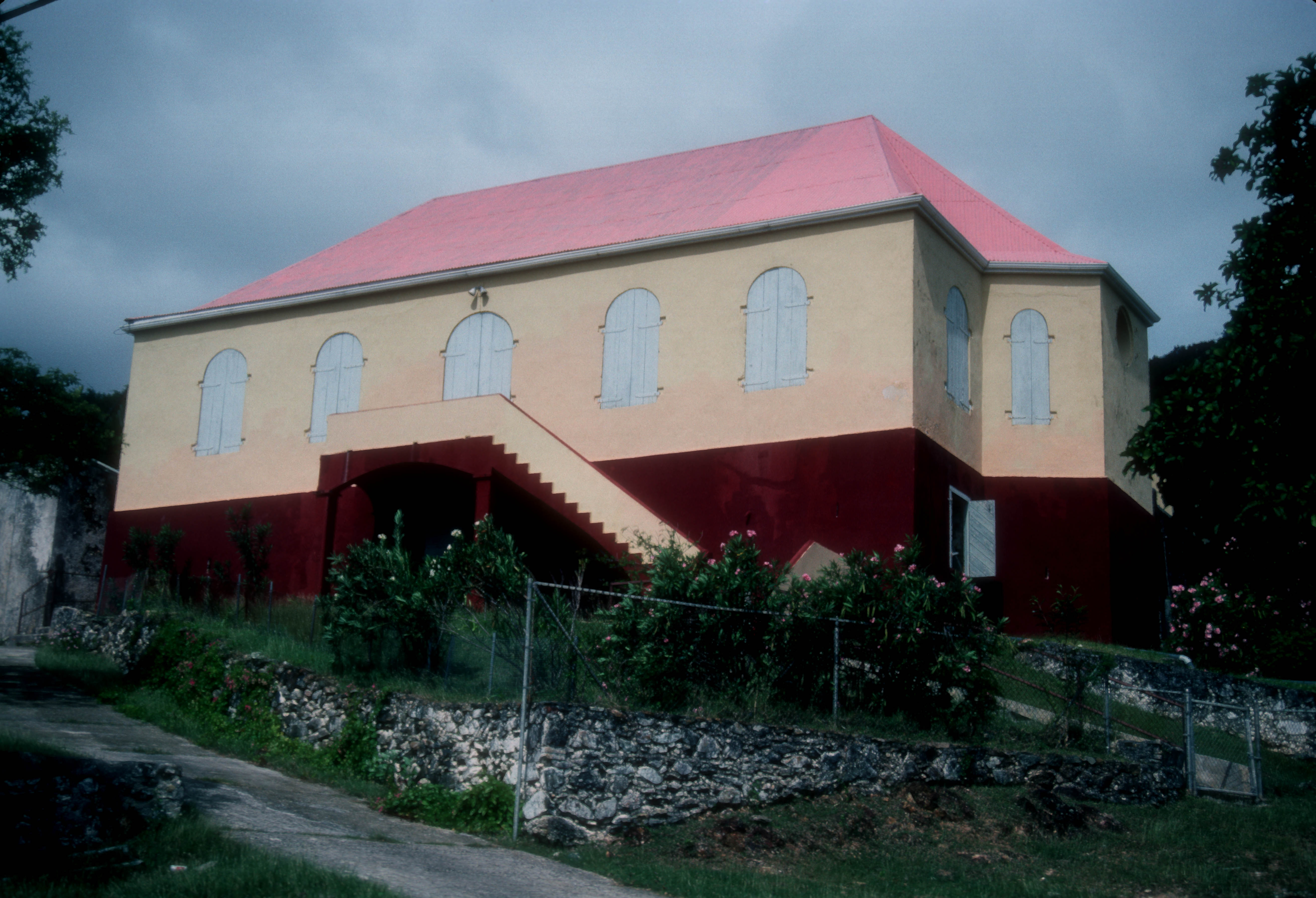
Emmaus Moravian Church

Each year in late February, a race runs along Centerline Road from Cruz Bay and ends in the Moravian Church ballfield in Coral Bay. In 2013, 31-year-old David Riddle of Cincinnati set the course record of 45:46, beating Christopher Reis' previous record of 46:00 set in 2011. Runner's World listed the race as one of the "10 Races to Beat the Winter Blues."

== Religion ==
The Emmaus Moravian Church in Coral Bay is listed on the U.S. National Register of Historic Places and holds an interesting place in St John's history. The Church stands next to the Caroline Estate plantation, the site of a 1733 slave revolt that resulted in the murder of the plantation owner and his 12-year-old daughter. This church is said to be haunted.

There is also a Roman Catholic church.

== Demographics ==
=== 2020 census ===
Coral Bay CDP, U.S. Virgin Islands – Racial and ethnic composition Note: the US Census treats Hispanic/Latino as an ethnic category. This table excludes Latinos from the racial categories and assigns them to a separate category. Hispanics/Latinos may be of any race.
| Race / Ethnicity (NH = Non-Hispanic) | Pop 2020 | % 2020 |
|---|---|---|
| White alone (NH) | 301 | 48.94% |
| Black or African American alone (NH) | 242 | 39.35% |
| Native American or Alaska Native alone (NH) | 3 | 0.49% |
| Asian alone (NH) | 3 | 0.49% |
| Native Hawaiian or Pacific Islander alone (NH) | 0 | 0.00% |
| Other race alone (NH) | 0 | 0.00% |
| Mixed race or Multiracial (NH) | 24 | 3.90% |
| Hispanic or Latino (any race) | 43 | 6.99% |
| Total | 616 | 100.00% |
