= Christiansted National Historic Site =

7 acres in St. Croix, US Virgin Islands managed by the National Park Service

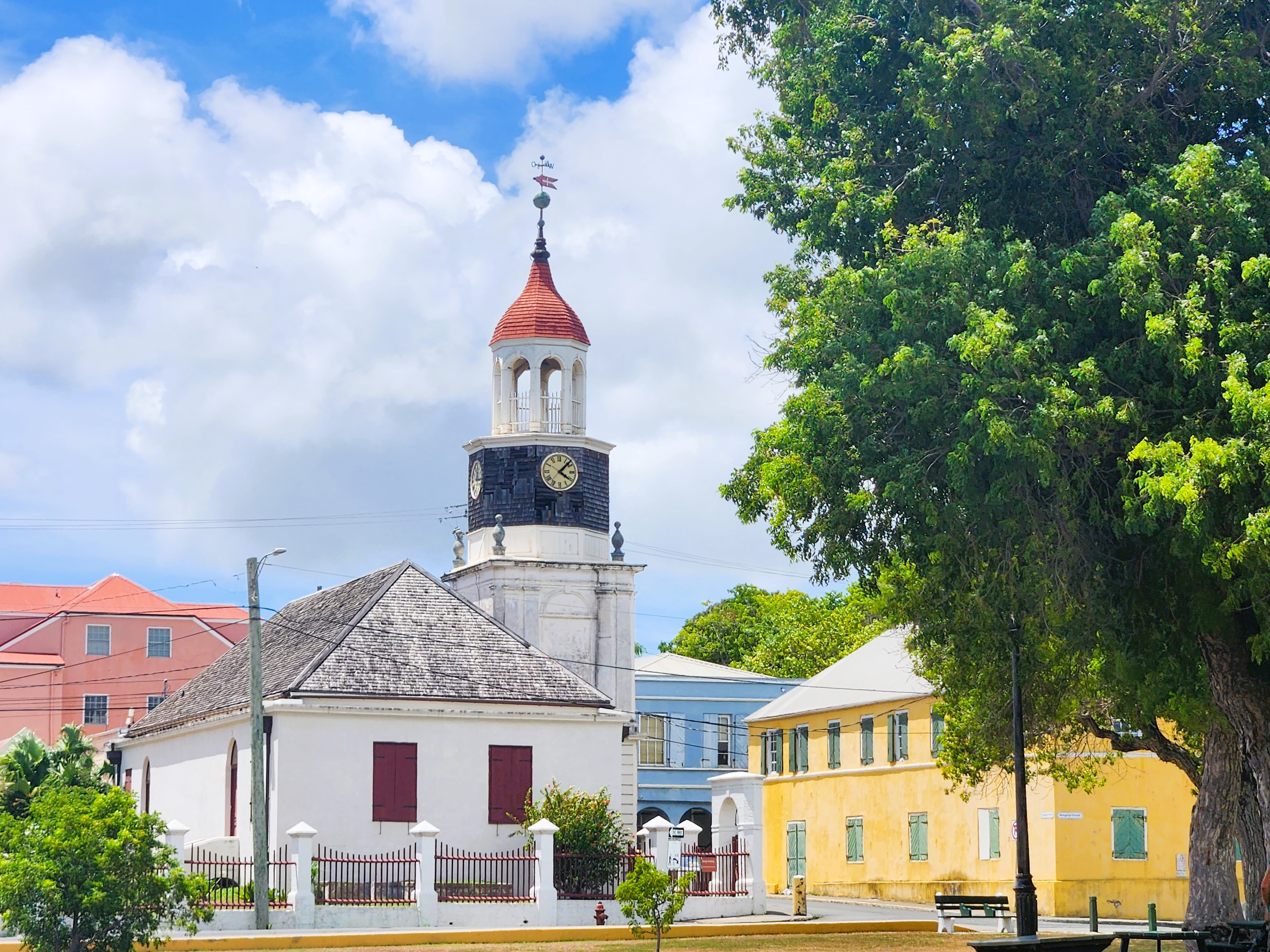
- Christiansted historic district with white Danish colonial style Lutheran church in the center

- Location within Saint Croix, U.S. Virgin Islands Location within the U.S. Virgin Islands Location within the Caribbean
- Location: Christiansted, Virgin Islands, USA
- Coordinates: 17°44′49″N 64°42′8″W
- Area: 27.15 acres (10.99 ha)
- Established: March 4, 1952
- Visitors: 100,165 (in 2025)
- Governing body: National Park Service
- Website: Christiansted National Historic Site

Christiansted National Historic Site commemorates urban colonial development of the Virgin Islands. It features 18th- and 19th-century structures in the heart of Christiansted, the capital of the former Danish West Indies on St. Croix Island.

The site consists of six historic structures: Fort Christiansværn (constructed from 1738 to 1749), the Danish West India and Guinea Company Warehouse (1749), the Church of Our Lord Sabaoth Steeple Building (1753), Customs House (built 1840–1842), the Scale House (1856), and Government House (1747). The Danish West India and Guinea Company held slave auctions in its warehouse until 1803, when the slave trade was outlawed.

== History ==
Beginning in May 1735, Christiansted was developed using a grid system. The Building Code of 1747 dictated street widths, setbacks, zoning, and building material. Masonry structures were the norm by the 1760s, and neoclassical architecture characterized the colonial government buildings.

The fort was constructed in 1738 on the remains of an earlier French fortification destroyed by a hurricane. The fort protected commerce from piracy and privateers, and local citizens from slave revolts. The first Danish governors were also housed there. The British occupied the colony from 1801 to 1803 and from 1807 to 1815. The fort housed the police headquarters, court offices, courthouse and archives starting in 1878. The soldiers were replaced by 60 gendarmes in 1906 and remained until Transfer Day in 1917.

The fort also served as the colony jail. A notable inmate was the mother of Alexander Hamilton, Rachel Faucette. She married her first husband, Johann Michael Lavien, in 1745, at age 16. In 1750, she refused to live with Lavien any longer, an offense for which Lavien had her jailed under Danish law. She spent several months in a 10 by 13 foot cell with one small window. Soon after being released, she fled to the British West Indies, where she met Hamilton's father.

The site was first established on March 4, 1952, as the Virgin Islands National Historic Site, through the initiative of concerned local citizens. Its purpose was to preserve the historic structures and grounds within its boundaries, and to interpret the Danish economy and way of life between 1733 and 1917, including colonial administration, military and naval establishment, international trade (including slave trade), religious diversity, architecture, trades, and crime and punishment. The site was renamed on January 16, 1961. As with all historic areas administered by the National Park Service, the historic site was listed on the National Register of Historic Places on October 15, 1966.

As of 2016, the National Park Service planned to celebrate its centennial with an initiative to rehabilitate the main warehouse facility into a slave trade museum, and to restore the complex to its 1833 appearance.

== Gallery ==
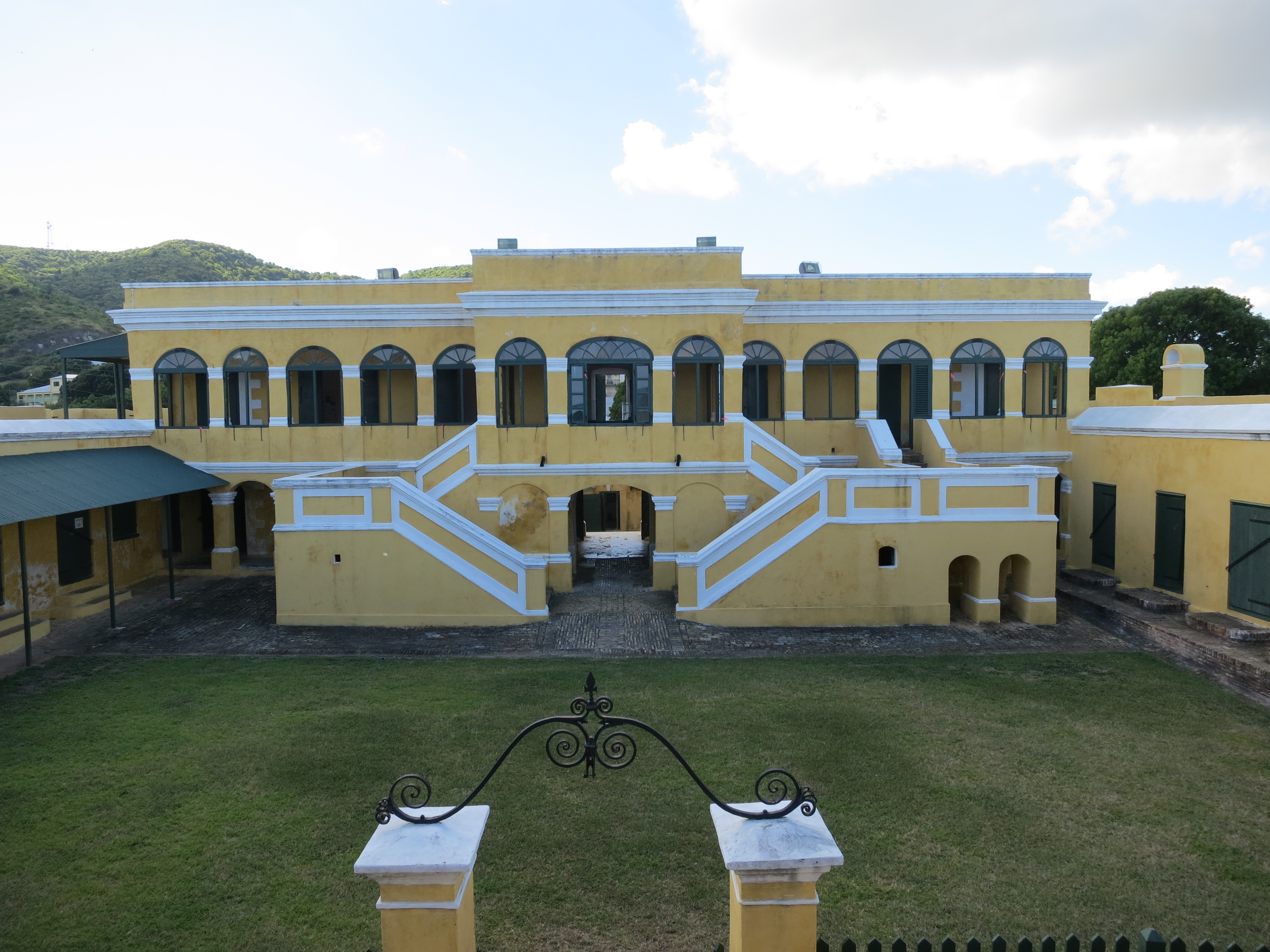
Interior of Fort Christiansværn

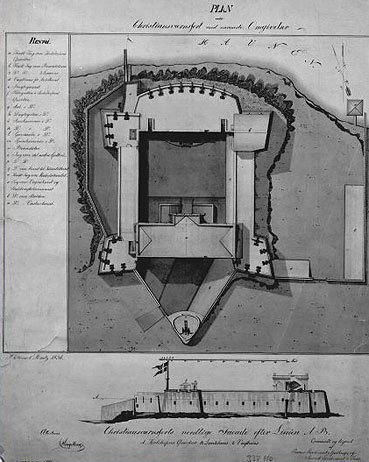
An 1836 plan of Fort Christiansværn

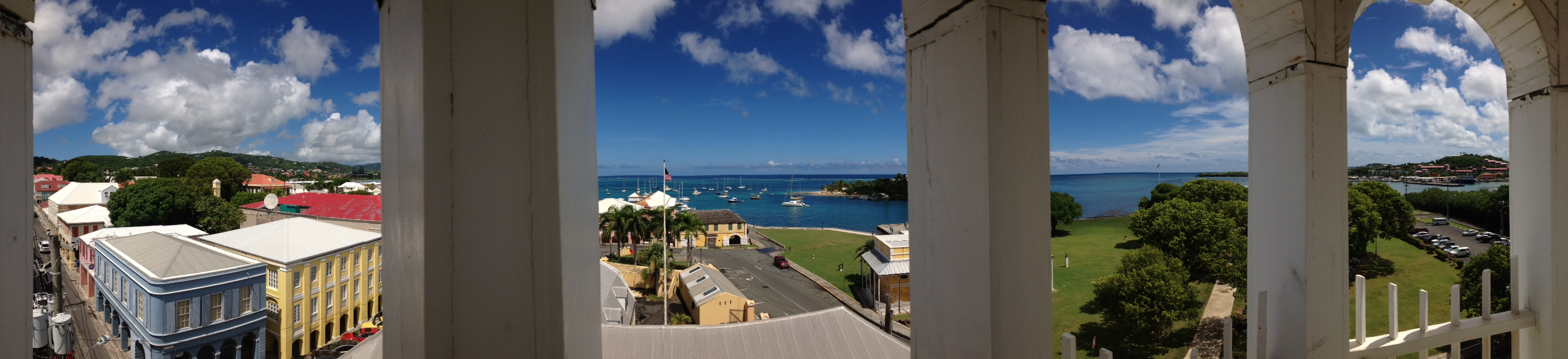
View from the Steeple Building

== See also ==
- Hispanic Heritage Sites (U.S. National Park Service)
