= Danish West India and Guinea Company Warehouse =

- U.S. National Register of Historic Places
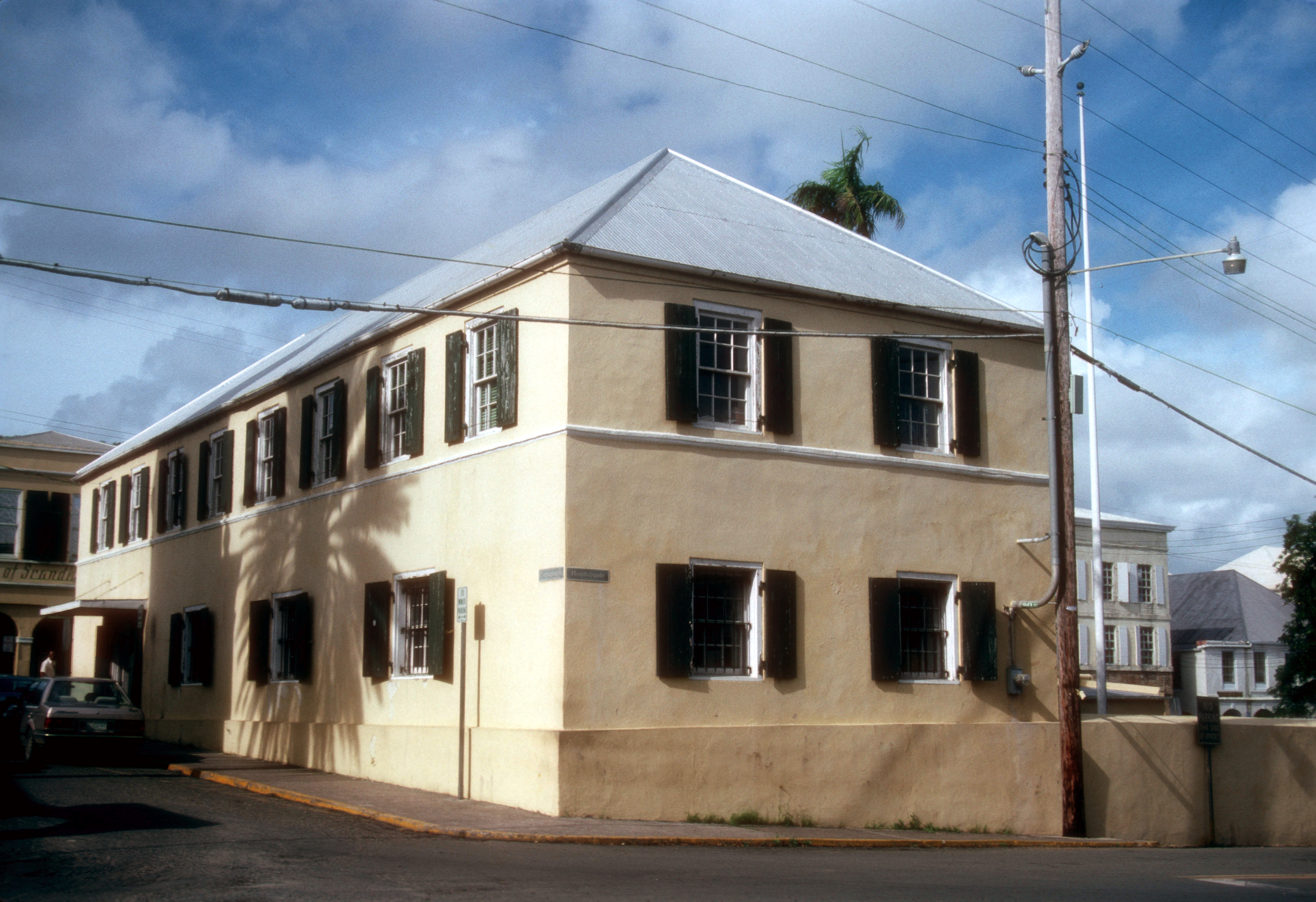

- Location within Saint Croix, U.S. Virgin Islands Location within the U.S. Virgin Islands Location within the Caribbean
- Location: Church and Company Sts., Christiansted, Virgin Islands
- Coordinates: 17°44′47.04″N 64°42′09.36″W
- Area: 1 acre (0.40 ha)
- Built: 1750
- NRHP reference No.: 74001940
- Added to NRHP: October 9, 1974

The Danish West India and Guinea Company Warehouse is a historic building located at Church and Company Streets in Christiansted, U.S. Virgin Islands. Built in 1749 for the Danish West India and Guinea Company, the building served as the center of Danish commerce on Saint Croix during the 18th and early 19th centuries. At the time, the U.S. Virgin Islands were known as the Danish West Indies, and Saint Croix had the most successful economy of the three islands. The building is representative of Danish colonial architecture and features stucco walls made of yellow brick imported from Denmark, an inner courtyard, and several cisterns. After its use as a warehouse ended in the 19th century, the building served as a telegraph office; it became a post office and customs house after the United States purchased the islands in 1917.

The building was added to the National Register of Historic Places on October 9, 1974. It is part of the Christiansted National Historic Site.
