= Hispanic Heritage Sites =

National park site

The National Park System is well endowed to commemorate Hispanic contributions to American society. Some 20 national parklands represent Hispanic heritage in the United States. Some sites remotely display Hispanic contributions to American culture. The National Park System not only preserves the history and contributions of Hispanic Americans, it is also a part of the nation's history. Over the years, the National Park Service has reflected the nation's social history. Among the first Hispanics who influenced the course of the National Parks were:

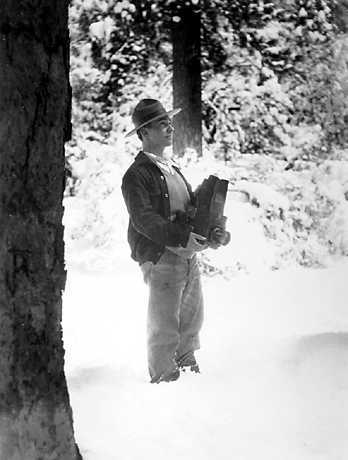
George Wright, 1929

Biologist

- George Melendez Wright was born in California in 1904. In 1927, he was hired at Yosemite National Park as assistant park naturalist. Through his studies and insight, the park service moved away from the destruction of predator to the scientific management of park plants, animals and scenery.
  - George Wright Society
  - Fauna of the National Parks of the United States, by George M Wright

Early Superintendents (not fully inclusive)

- Julio Marrero-Nunez (San Juan 1962–1970);
- Edward C. Rodriquez Jr. (Organ Pipe Cactus 1973–1975, Southern Arizona Group 1989);
- Ray G. Martinez Jr. (Organ Pipe Cactus 1975–1979);
- Edward C. Rodriquez Jr. (Amistad 1975–89);
- Ernest W. Ortega (Pecos 1978–80);
- José A. Cisneros (San Antonio Mission 1979–1988, Bandelier 1988–90, Gettysburg 1989–93, Big Bend 1993-99);
- Santiago Cruz (San Juan 1980);
- Luis Garcia-Curbelo (San Juan 1980–1985);
- Robert C. Reyes (Florissant Fossil Beds 1980–83, Great Sand Dunes 1983–1988);
- David P. Herrerra (Whitman Mission 1987–1990)
- Eddie L. Lopez (Grant-Kohrs Ranch 1988 – c. 1993);
- Peter G. Sanchez (act’g Haleakala 1988 – c. 1993);
- Vidal V. Martinez (Sagamore Hill 1990 – c. 1993);
- Edward A. Lopez (Coronado 1990 – c. 1993);

Regional Directors

- Ernesto Quintana, Midwest Region (2003-date)

== National Park Units ==
- Christiansted National Historic Site (Christiansted, United States Virgin Islands)
  - On Saint Croix, one of the Caribbean islands visited by Christopher Columbus.
- Cabrillo National Monument (San Diego, California)
  - Juan Rodríguez Cabrillo, Portuguese explorer who claimed the West Coast of the United States for Spain in 1542, is memorialized here.
- Castillo de San Marcos National Monument (St. Augustine, Florida)
  - Construction on the oldest masonry fort in the continental United States was started in 1672 by the Spanish to protect St. Augustine. St. Augustine is the first permanent continually-occupied settlement in the continental United States.
- Chamizal National Memorial (El Paso, Texas)
  - The peaceful settlement of the 99-year boundary dispute between the United States and Mexico is memorialized here. International artists present cultural exchange programs in drama, dance, and music.
- Coronado National Memorial (Hereford, Arizona)
  - The first European exploration of the Southwest is commemorated here at the spot whether the expedition of Francisco Vásquez de Coronado in 1540 entered what is now the United States.
- De Soto National Memorial (Bradenton, Florida)
  - The landing of Spanish explorer Hernando de Soto in 1539 and the first extensive exploration of the southern United States by Europeans are commemorated.
- Dry Tortugas National Park
- El Morro National Monument (Ramah, New Mexico)
  - "Inscription Rock" is a soft sandstone monolith on which are carved hundreds of inscriptions. Included are inscriptions of the Spanish explorers and settlers of the American Southwest.
- Fort Matanzas National Monument (St. Augustine, Florida)
  - This Spanish fort was built (1740–1742) to warn St. Augustine of British or other enemy approach from the south.
- Gulf Islands National Seashore Bateria de San Antonio (Gulf Breeze, Florida)
  - Offshore islands have sparkling sand beaches, historic forts, and nature trails.
- Juan Bautista de Anza National Historic Trail
- Padre Island National Seashore
- Palo Alto Battlefield National Historical Park
- Pecos National Historical Park
- Presidio of San Francisco
- Salinas Pueblo Missions National Monument (Mountainair, New Mexico)
  - This park preserves and interprets the best remaining examples of 17th-century Spanish Franciscan mission churches and coventos remaining in the United States.
- Salt River Bay National Historical Park and Ecological Preserve
- San Antonio Missions National Historical Park (San Antonio, Texas)
  - Four Spanish frontier missions, part of a colonization system that stretched across the Spanish Southwest in the 17th, 18th, and 19th centuries are commemorated here.
- San Juan National Historic Site (San Juan, Puerto Rico)
  - These masonry fortifications, oldest in the territorial limits of the United States, were begun by the Spaniards in the 16th century to protect a strategic harbor guarding the sea lanes to the new world.
- Tumacácori National Historical Park (Tumacacori, Arizona)
  - This historic Spanish Catholic mission building stands near the site first visited by Jesuit Father Kino in 1691.

== See also ==
- National Park Service
