= Old Point Loma Lighthouse =

Lighthouse in California, United States

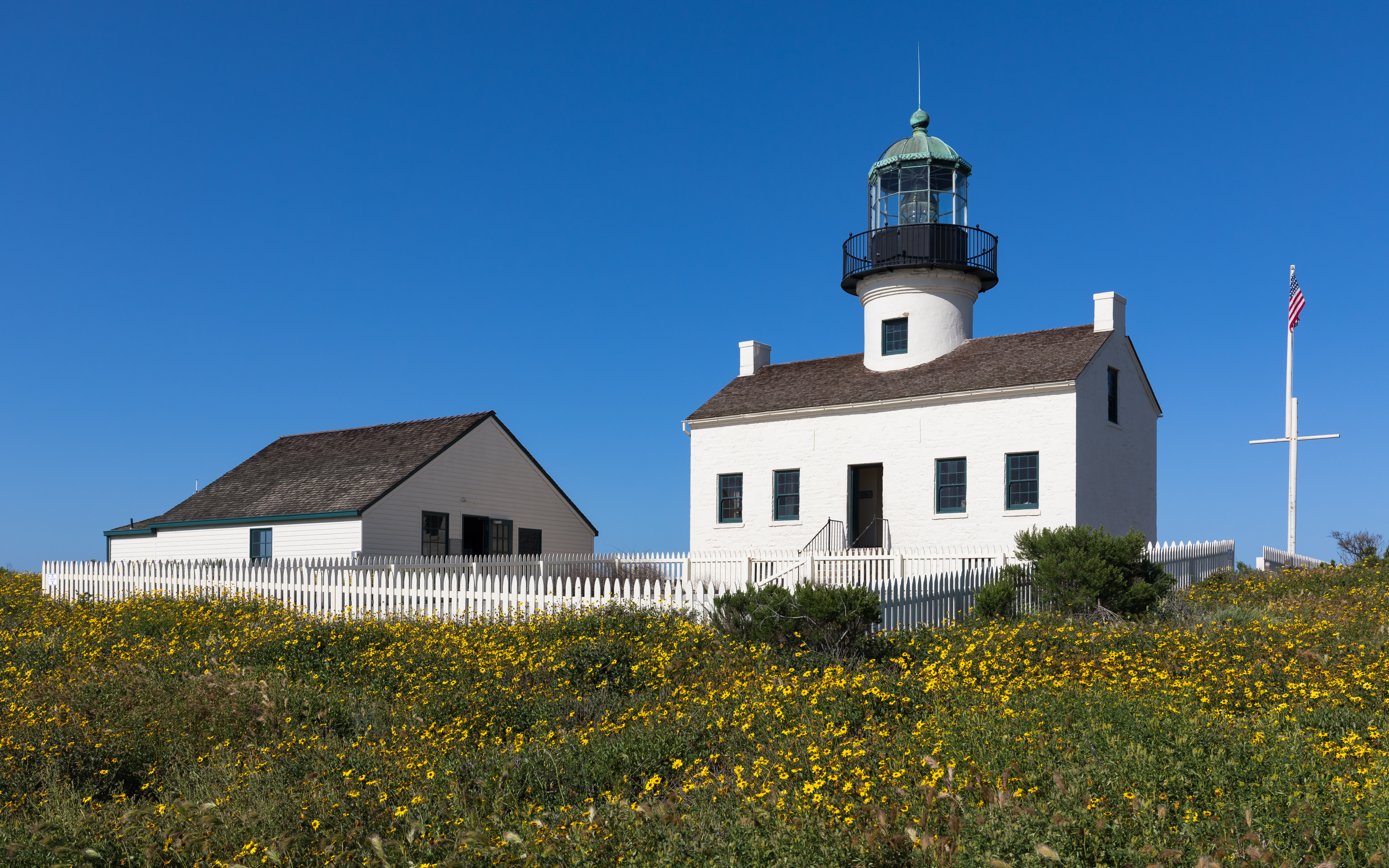
- Old Point Loma Light Station in 2019
- Location: Cabrillo National Monument

Tower
- Height: 46 feet (14 m)

Light
- First lit: 1855
- Deactivated: 1891s
- Focal height: 462 feet (141 m)
- Lens: Third-order Fresnel lens
- Old Point Loma Lighthouse
- U.S. National Register of Historic Places
- California Historical Landmark
- San Diego Historic Landmark
- Location: Included in Cabrillo National Monument, San Diego, California
- Architectural style: Cape Cod style
- NRHP reference No.: 74000350
- CHISL No.: 51
- SDHL No.: 17

Significant dates
- Added to NRHP: June 27, 1974
- Designated SDHL: November 6, 1970

The original Point Loma Lighthouse is a historic lighthouse located on the Point Loma peninsula at the mouth of San Diego Bay in San Diego, California. It is situated on half an acre of land designated Cabrillo National Monument. It is no longer in operation as a lighthouse but is open to the public as a museum. It is sometimes erroneously called the "Old Spanish Lighthouse", but in fact it was not built during San Diego's Spanish or Mexican eras; it was built in 1855 by the United States government after California's admission as a state.

== History ==
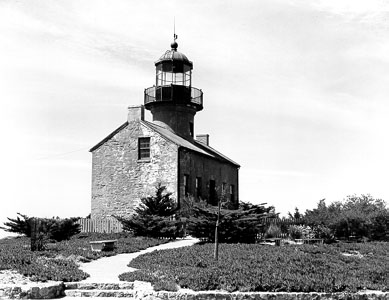
The lighthouse c. 1865, prior to the construction of the assistant keeper's quarters.

On September 28, 1850, just 19 days after admitting California to the Union, Congress appropriated $90,000 to construct lighthouses along the California coast. A second appropriation of $59,434 was made in 1854 to complete the job. Lighthouses were designated for Alcatraz Island, Point Conception, Battery Point, Farallon Island, Point Pinos and Point Loma.

A site was chosen in 1851 near the summit of Point Loma. The contract was given to the Washington, D.C. company Gibbon and Kelley. The local supervisor was William J. Timanus.

Construction was begun in April 1854, when a shipment of materials arrived from San Francisco. The lantern and lens had to be ordered from Paris and arrived in August 1855. The lighthouse was completed by October 1855 and was lighted for the first time at sunset November 15, 1855. It was designated light number 355, of the Twelfth United States Lighthouse District.

When the lighthouse was constructed, an additional small structure was built next to it. This building was originally used as a storehouse for oil, wood, and other supplies. However, in 1875 part of it was converted into a two-room apartment for the assistant lighthouse keeper. It was built with rough lumber and the inside was lined with cloth and paper, since cracks would frequently develop in the walls. This thin lining was later replaced with tongue and groove boards. More repairs must have been made in 1880 for the structure was still being used as a living space for the assistant. Today this building has been changed once again, and now serves as a museum. It holds the original lens of the New Point Loma lighthouse as well as maps and more information about Point Loma and its history.

While in operation the lighthouse had the highest elevation of any lighthouse in the United States. However, the location on top of a 400-foot cliff meant that fog and low clouds often obscured the light from the view of ships. On foggy nights the lighthouse keeper would sometimes discharge a shotgun to warn ships away. On March 23, 1891, the flame was permanently extinguished and the light was replaced by the New Point Loma lighthouse at a lower elevation.

After its abandonment the lighthouse deteriorated. In 1913 President Woodrow Wilson dedicated the lighthouse and a half-acre of land as Cabrillo National Monument, for the purpose of erecting a large statue of Juan Rodriguez Cabrillo. However, no such statue was actually built for several decades. In 1935 the lighthouse underwent a major renovation and a new road to the monument was constructed. In 1949 a statue of Cabrillo, donated by the government of Portugal, was installed on land near the lighthouse.

In 1984, the light was re-lit by the National Park Service for the first time in 93 years, in celebration of the site's 130th birthday. More than 3,000 people attended the celebration, including more than 100 descendants of former lighthouse keepers Robert and Maria Israel.

== Keepers ==
The names of the lighthouse keepers were:

- James P. Keating (1854–1859)
- H. C. Wiley (1859)
- J. N. Covarrubias (1859–1860)
- Joseph Renier (1860)
- James P. Keating (1860–1861)
- W. C. Price (1861–1867)
- J. D. Jenkins (1867–1871)
- Enos A. Wall (1871–1872)
- James J. Ferra (1872–1873)
- Robert D. Israel (1873–1891).

== Robert Israel ==
San Diego pioneer Robert Decatur Israel was lighthouse keeper for the longest period of time, 18 years. He was born in Pittsburgh, Pennsylvania on March 23, 1826. His father was described as Pennsylvania Dutch and mother as Scotch-Irish. He wasn't Jewish, but because of his surname many people today mistakenly assume that he was. He had fought in the Mexican–American War, including the famous Battle of Chapultepec. He moved to San Diego in 1848 and worked as a blacksmith and saloon-keeper. He and Maria Arcadia Alipas Machado, the daughter of a long-established San Diego family, were married by a priest in 1852 at the Casa de Estudillo in Old Town. They had four children: Henry Clay Israel, Joseph Perry Israel; Robert Lincoln Israel, and a second Joseph Perry Israel, born after his older brother had died.

Israel was appointed assistant lighthouse keeper in 1871 and promoted to lighthouse keeper in 1874. His wife Maria was the assistant keeper, like most wives of lighthouse keepers. Their family lived alone on the Point, making sure that the lighthouse was illuminated each night. The Israels lived and worked on Point Loma for 18 years, where they watched their children and grandchildren grow up. One of their grandsons was born at the lighthouse.

Because of the fog, another lighthouse was built closer to the Pacific Ocean shore line, in the area adjoining Cabrillo National Monument now occupied by a U.S. Coast Guard Station. On March 23, 1891 the old light was extinguished and the new one lit. Israel took over the new location but was dismissed as the lighthouse keeper in 1892. He died at age 81 on January 12, 1908. He is buried at the Fort Rosecrans National Cemetery. His grave 74 in section 75 is marked by a stone with a Christian cross. Some of his descendants now serve as volunteer re-enactors at the lighthouse.

== Life at the lighthouse ==
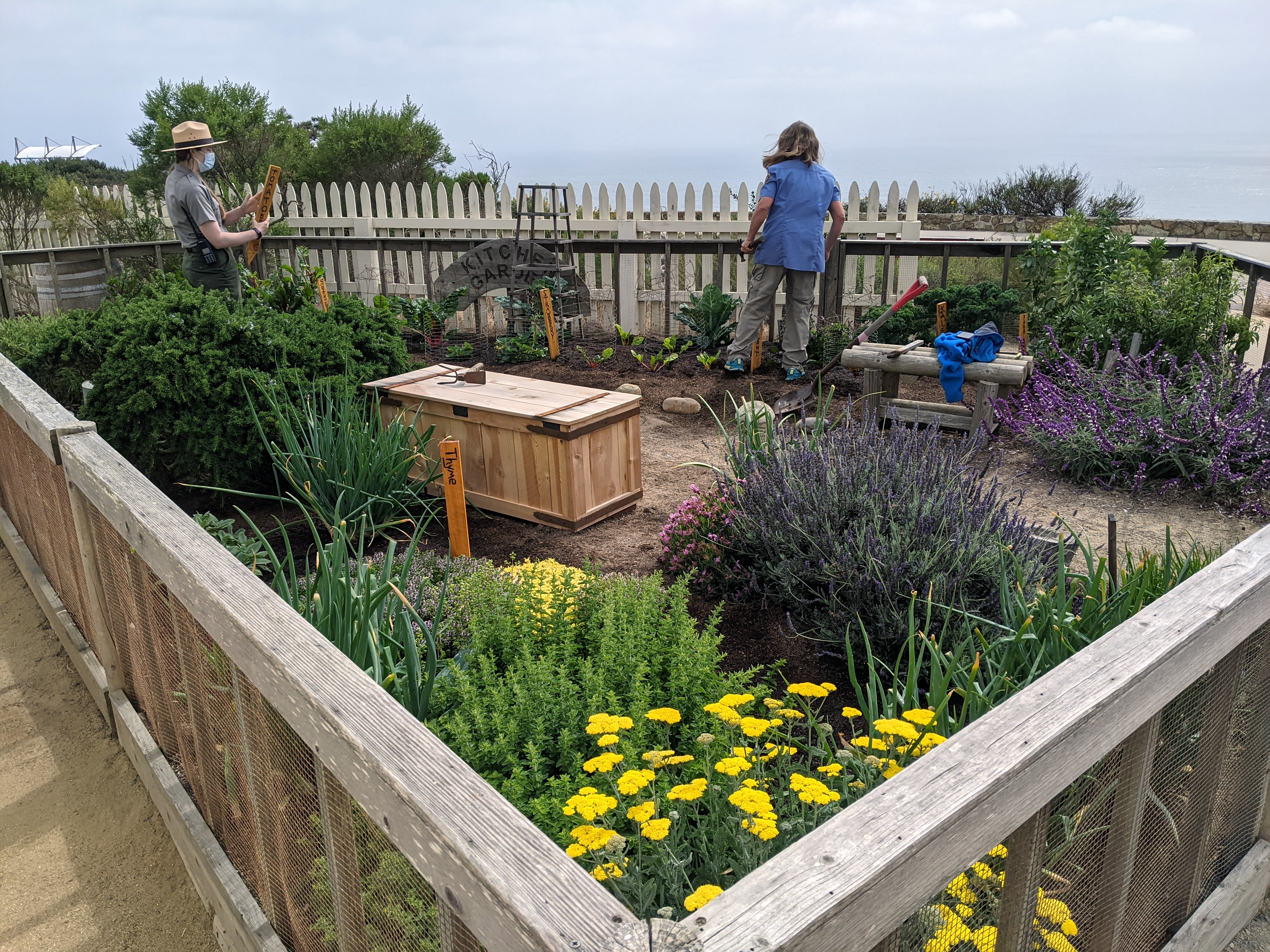
The National Park service maintains a garden on site, re-enacting how keepers grew food for their kitchen.

The Old Point Loma Lighthouse was not just the housing for a light; it was also the home of the people who took care of the light. The keepers and their families lived in the lighthouse. Visitors can now view some of the rooms to see what their life was like. The lighthouse was a bustling family home. The Israel family, including their three surviving boys and a niece, all grew up there. They gardened, kept horses, and raised chickens, pigs and goats. The children rowed across the bay to Old Town each day for school. People from town would sometimes drive by horse and buggy over a dirt road (now Catalina Boulevard) to picnic and visit the lighthouse and its keepers.

== After deactivation ==
After the lighthouse was deactivated it fell into disrepair. In 1913, it was proposed to tear down the dilapidated lighthouse and replace it with a monumental statue of Juan Rodríguez Cabrillo. The statue was never made, but to accommodate it, one-half acre around the lighthouse was set aside as Cabrillo National Monument by Presidential Proclamation. The monument was turned over to the National Park Service in 1933. By 1935 the metal lantern room had been rebuilt and the lighthouse restored to its original condition. A concessionaire lived in the lighthouse, offering tours of the building and operating a tea room in the southern room on the main floor.

With the outbreak of war in 1941, the lighthouse was painted camouflage green and was used as a signal tower to direct ships into San Diego Harbor. After the war the lighthouse was returned to the National Park Service. During the 1980s it was restored and filled with period furnishings to resemble its appearance when the Israel family lived there. In 2003–2004 the surrounding area was also restored to a more authentic look, including native plants, a vegetable garden, and a water catchment system. The lantern room currently houses the third-order lens from the Mile Rocks Lighthouse.

== The lighthouse today ==
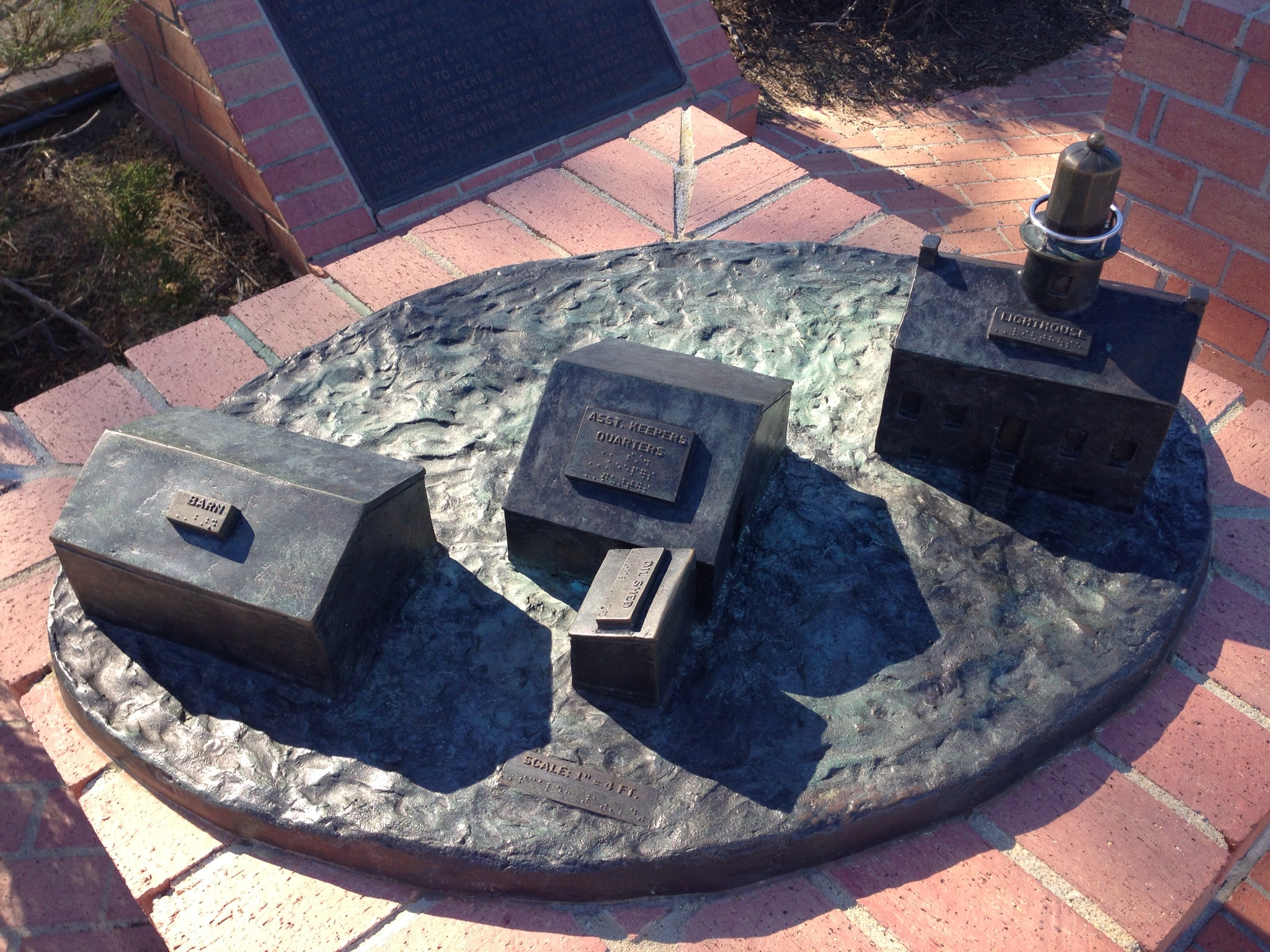
A model of the Old Lighthouse complex shows the lighthouse (right) and the assistant quarters (center) and a barn (left). The barn is no longer present.

Today the lighthouse is no longer in service but stands as a landmark and museum. Visitors may enter the lighthouse and view parts of the living quarters there. Visitors are sometimes greeted by volunteer historical re-enactors including "Captain Israel", a real historical figure who was lighthouse keeper from 1871 to 1892, or "members of the crew" of Cabrillo's ship.

Although the tower of the lighthouse is normally closed off to the public, there are two days a year when it is open. These dates are August 25, which is the National Park Service's Birthday, and November 15, which is the Lighthouse's Anniversary.

== Historical Information from USCG web site ==
- One of the first eight lighthouses on Pacific Coast
- Architect: Ammi B. Young, Department of Treasury
- Contractors: Gibbons & Kelly, Baltimore, Maryland
- Structure completed in 1854
- Third-order Fresnel lens originally intended for Humboldt Harbor installed 1855.
- First lighted November 15, 1855.
- Cost of lens and lantern as purchased from Sautter & Co., Paris, France for $3,810.
- Overall size of third-order lens 3.17 feet (0.97 m) in diameter
- Height of lens was 462 feet (141 m) above sea level
- Source of illumination was sperm whale oil, colza, lard oil, kerosene
- Distance visible was 28 miles (45 km)
- Lighthouse deactivated on March 23, 1891, and lens removed
- Lighthouse structure restored by National Park Service in 1935.
- Fourth-order lens from Humboldt Harbor (Table Rock Light) (1.5 feet in diameter) loaned to NPS by United States Coast Guard in 1955. On exhibit in Old Point Loma Light from 1955 to May 1981 and returned to Coast Guard, May 1981.
- Third-order Fresnel lens (from Mile Rock LightMile Rocks Lighthouse) loaned to Cabrillo National Monument in May 1981.
- Lens transfer (off-loading from CG Cutter Rush) was scheduled for Wednesday, May 20, 1981
- Lens will be on display in Cabrillo National Monument Visitor Center until lighthouse tower and lantern are restored and can safely accommodate third-order lens.
- Description written by Harmon Lougher, Chief Photographer's Mate, U. S. Coast Guard, sometime prior to 1973

The long neck of land enclosing North San Diego Bay on the West side is known as Point Loma. The origin of the name comes from a legend of a flaxen haired little Russian girl, the sole survivor of a shipwreck, who was found wandering on shore. The local residents took her in and named her Loma and she grew up to become the cynosure of many ardent male eyes. A rejected suitor slew the girl and fled to the point where he met his rival on a narrow trail above the sea. A knife fight ensued and the men fell to their death on the rocks below. Legend has it that Point Loma was named after this girl. Actually the word 'Loma' in Portuguese means light.(NOTE: Mr. Lougher was mistaken about this. "Loma" is a Spanish word meaning "hill". The original name of the peninsula was "La Punta de la Loma de San Diego", meaning Hill Point of San Diego. This was later anglicized to Point Loma.) Old Point Loma Light—the first lighthouse to be erected in Southern California as distinguished from the present Point Loma Light—was constructed in 1851 and presently being preserved as a memorial. Not used for lighthouse purposes since 1891, the old tower, was set aside by President Wilson in 1913 as a national monument and is now cared for by the U.S. Park Service. The old tower was abandoned because it was situated 462 feet above the sea. At this unusual height, the light was often obscured by high fogs. A romantic error attributes Old Point Loma Light to Spanish origin. When it was built some old Spanish tiles were used in its cellar floorings. That is the full scope of its Latin ancestry. Talk has it that the Spanish had a beacon on Point Loma in 1701, but it has never been verified.

== See also ==
- List of lighthouses in the United States
- Cabrillo National Monument
- New Point Loma lighthouse

== Gallery ==
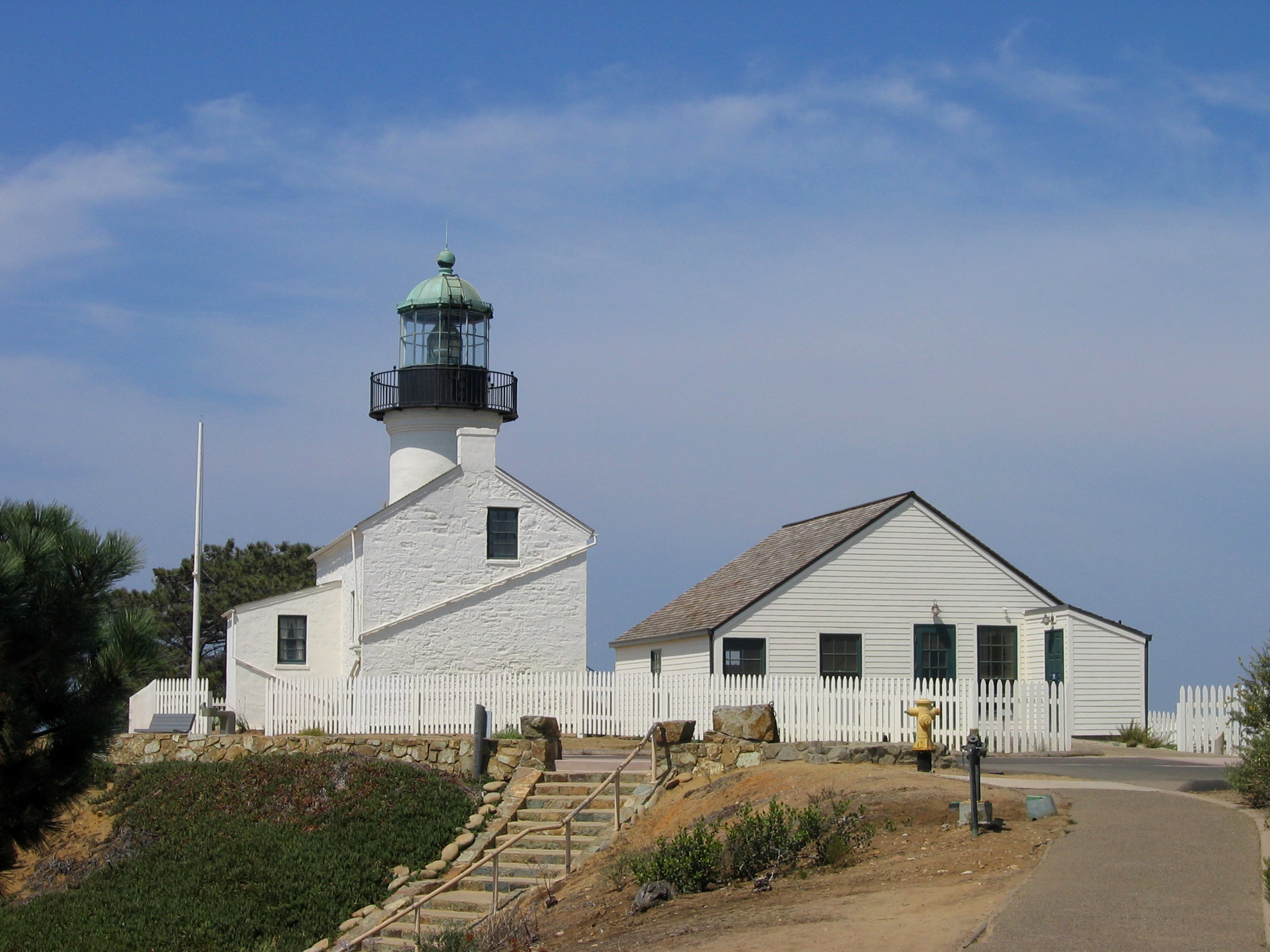

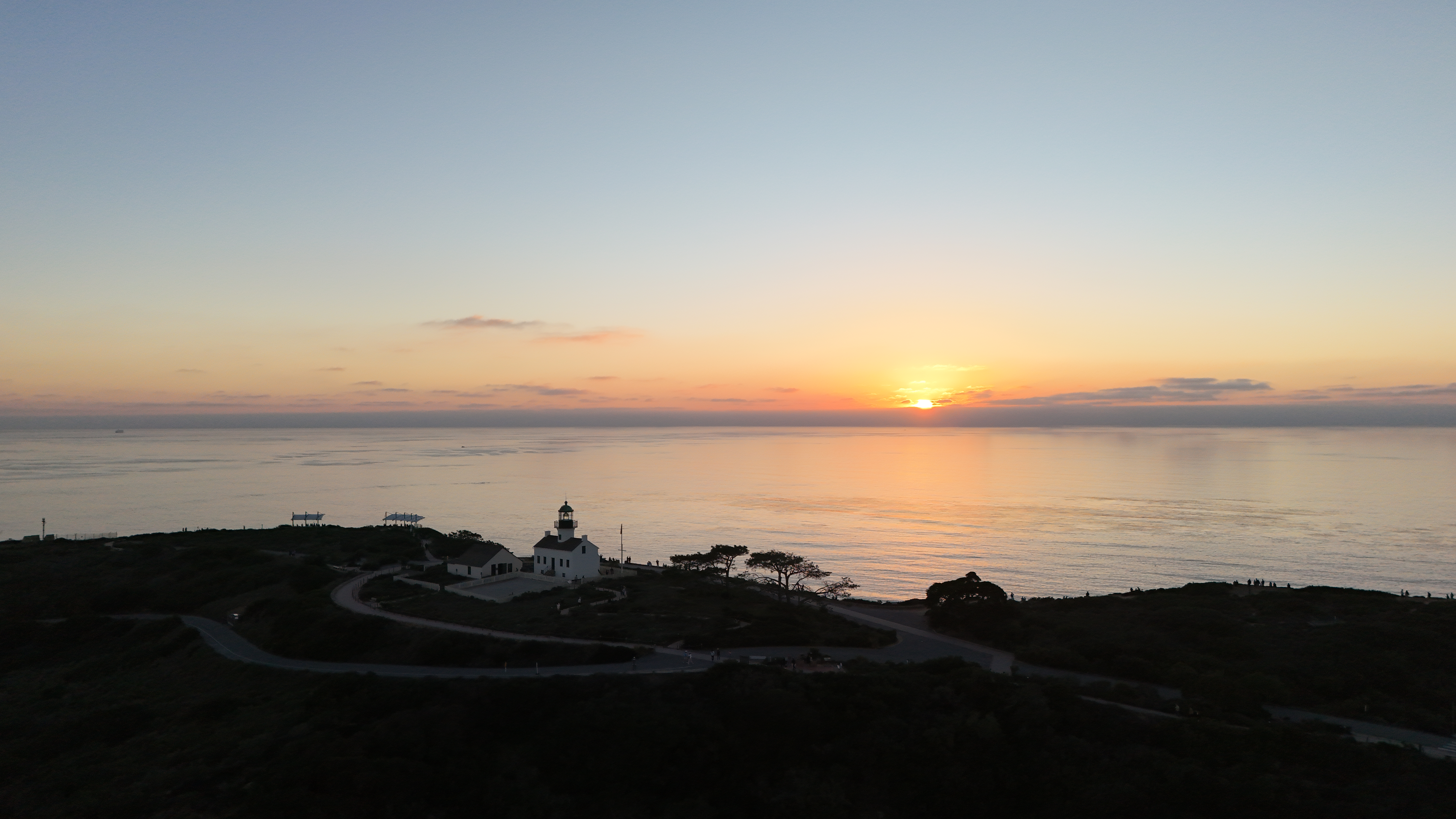

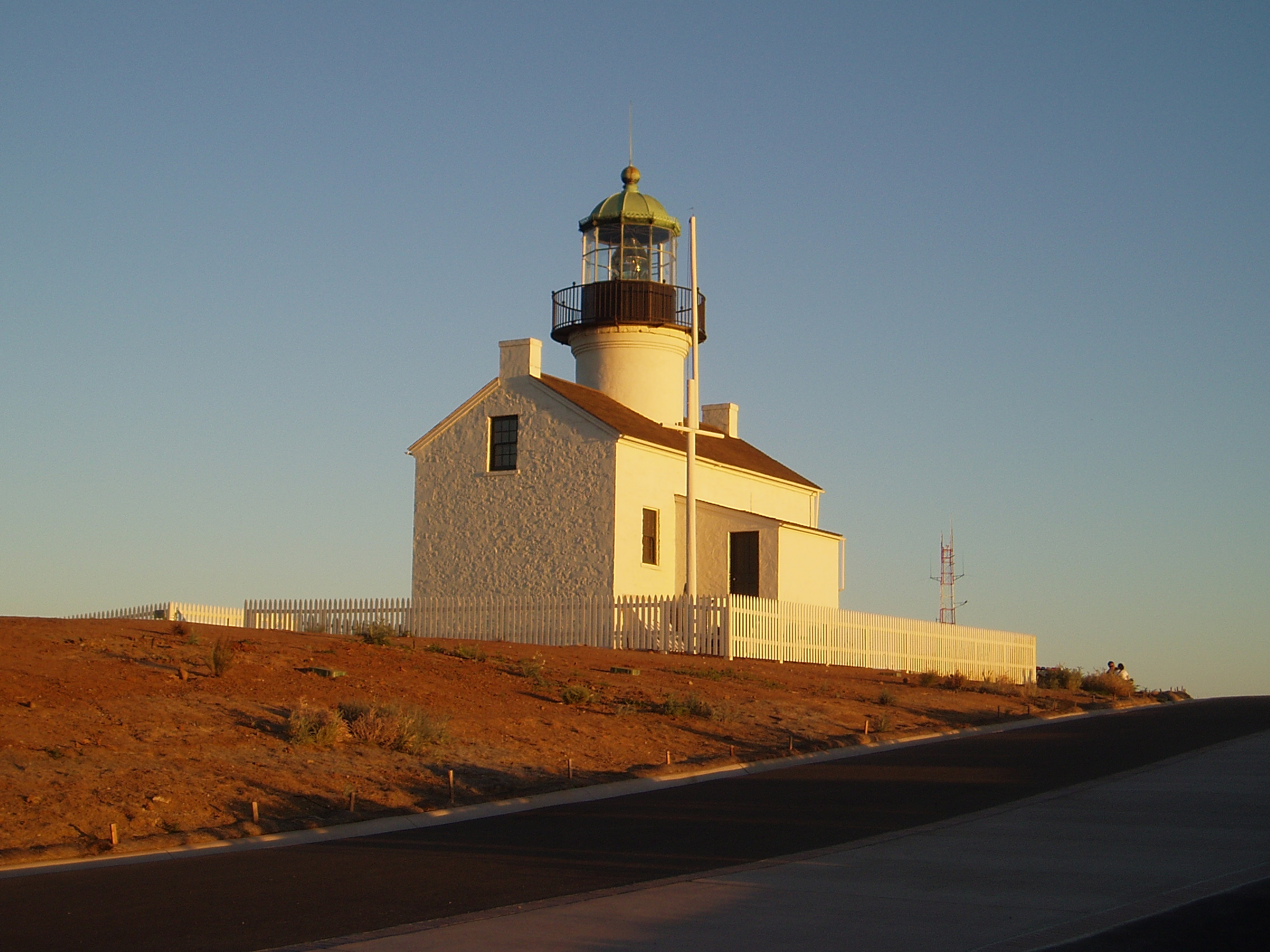

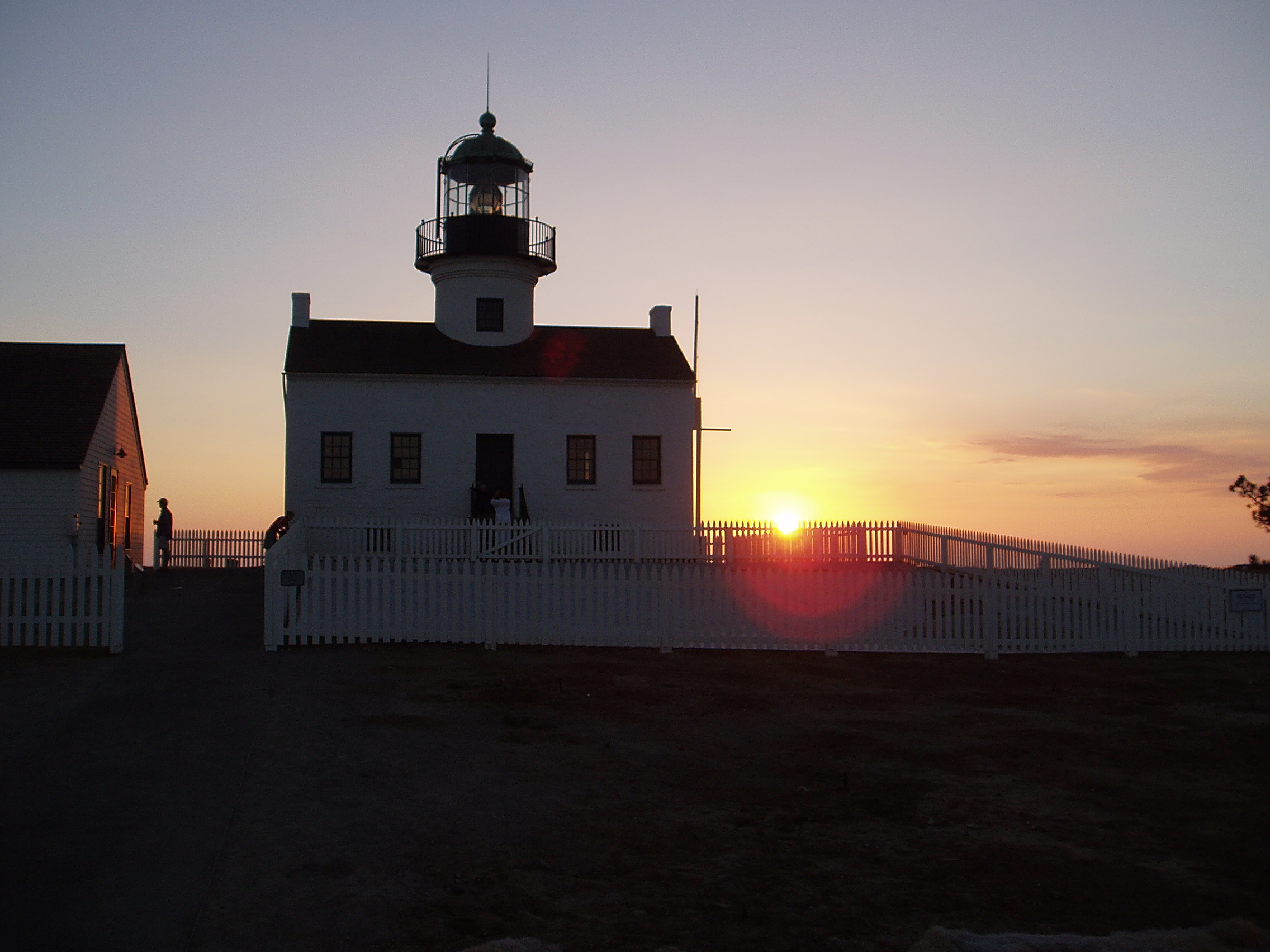

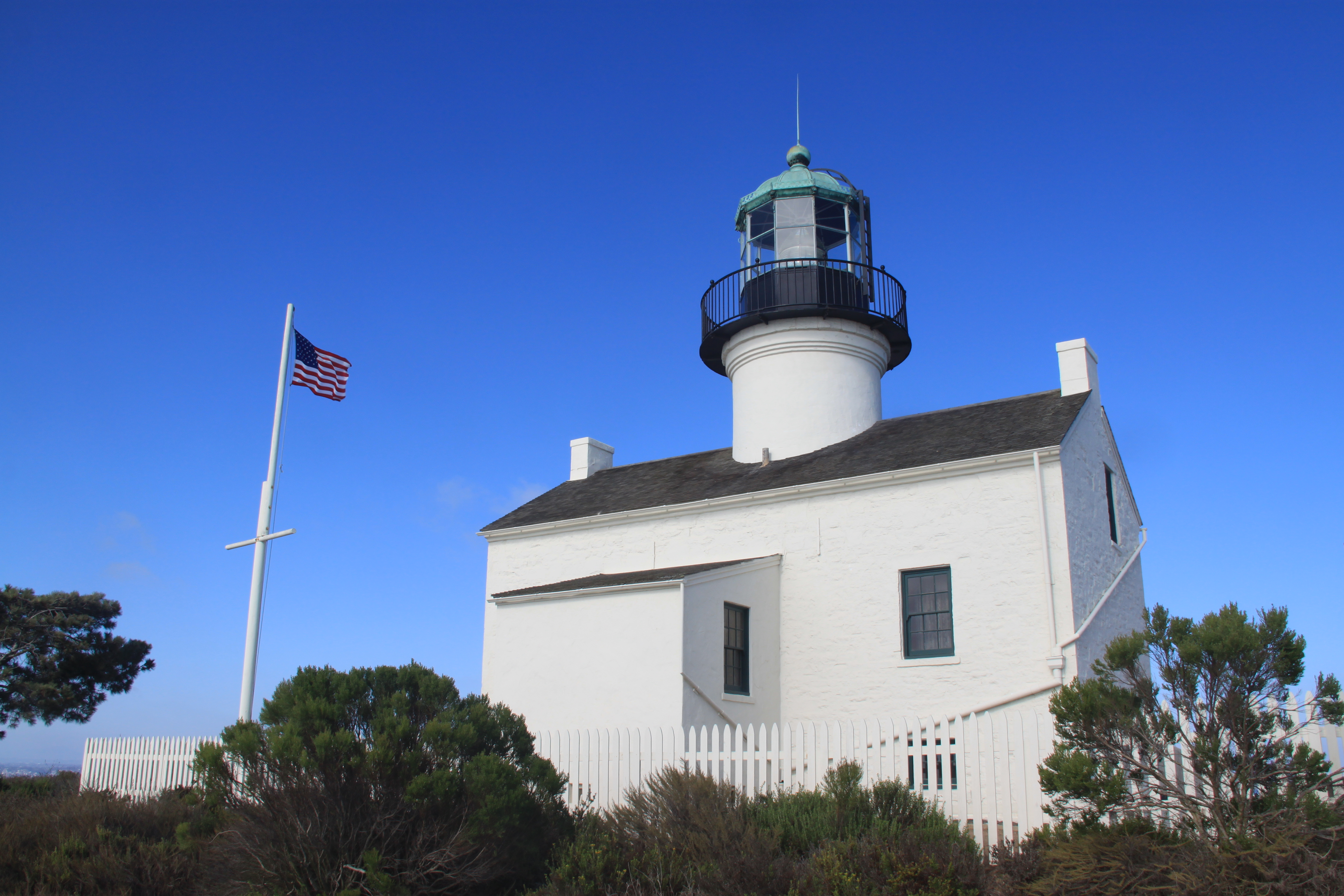

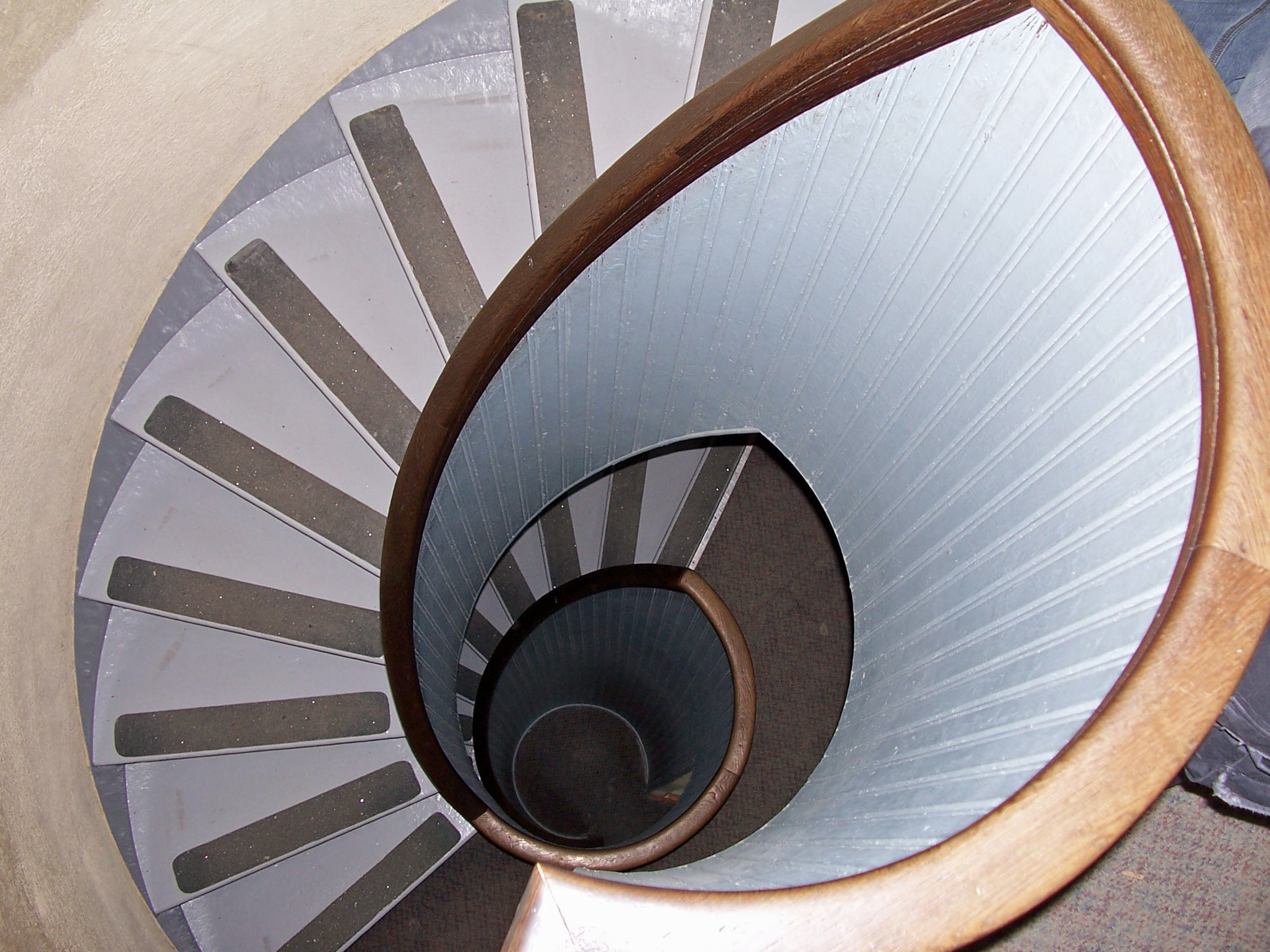

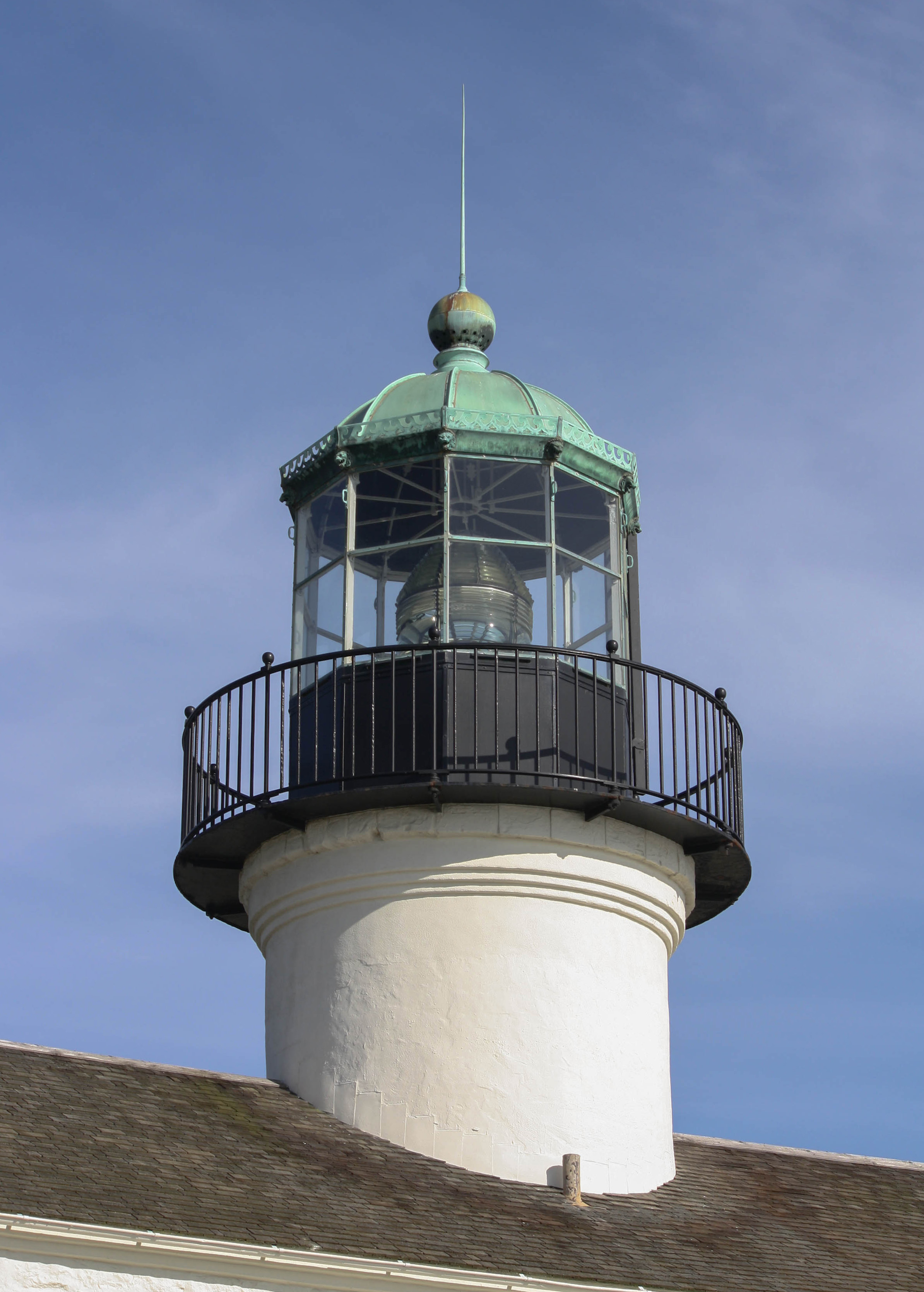

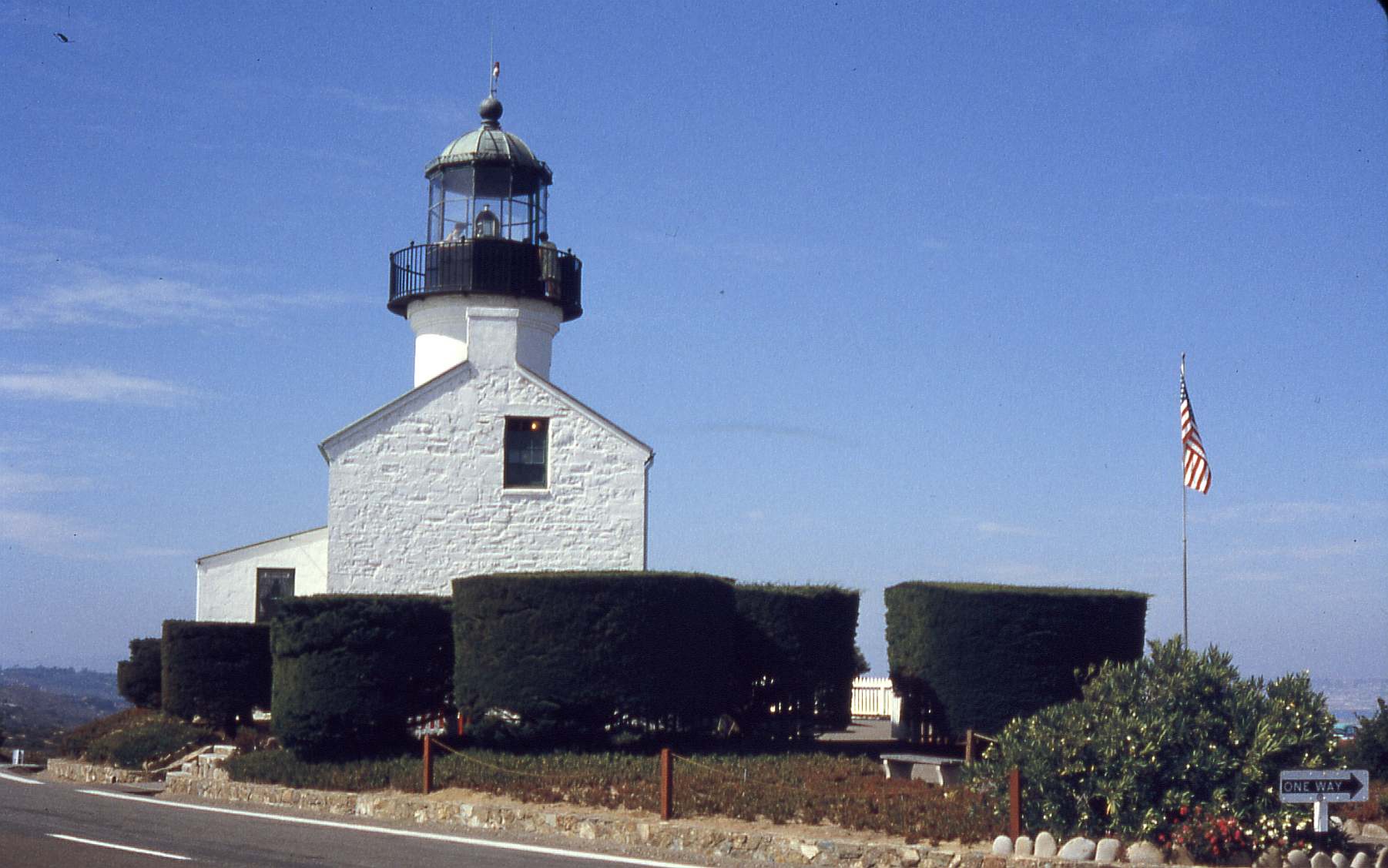

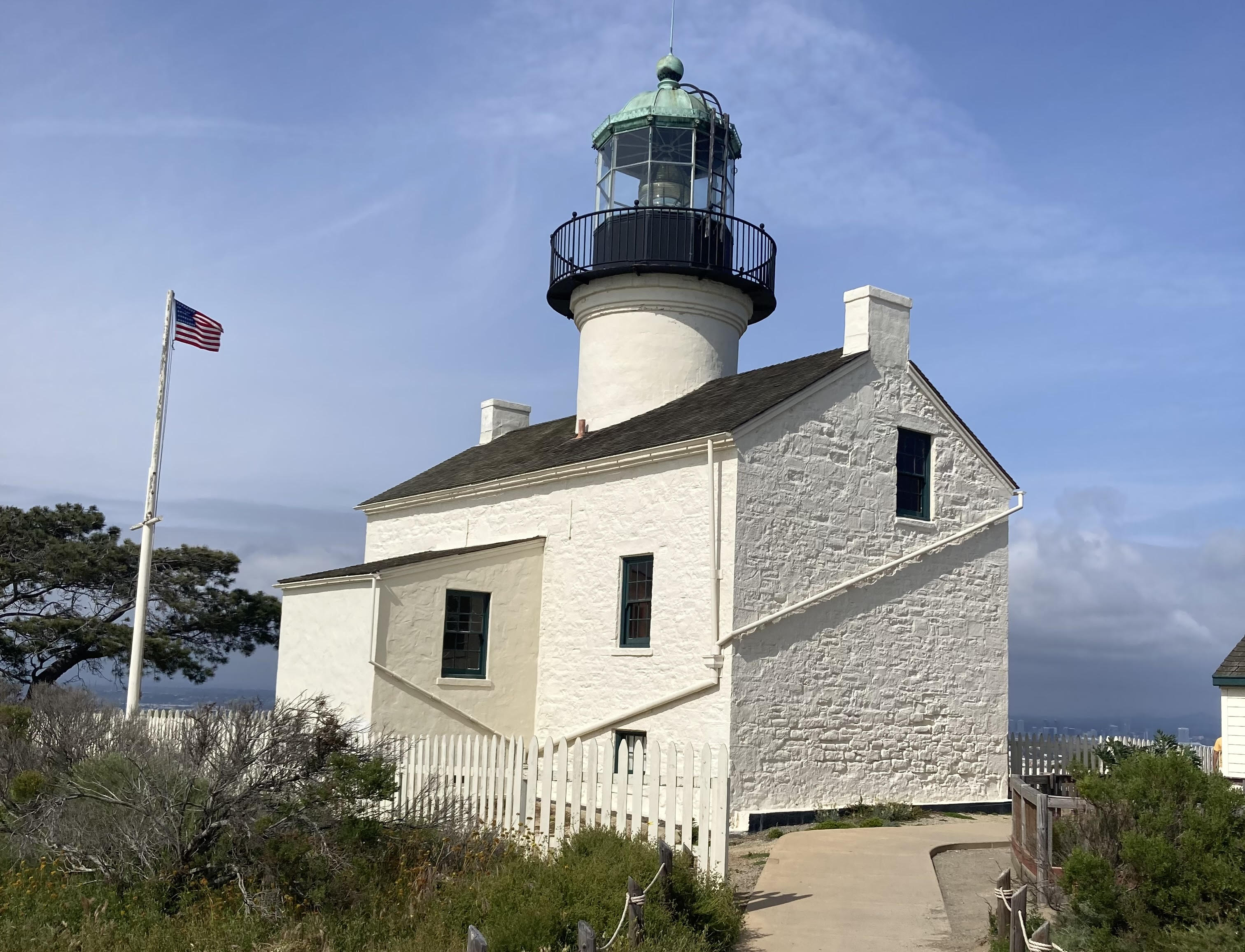
