= New Point Loma Lighthouse =

Lighthouse in California, United States

Point Loma Light New Point Loma
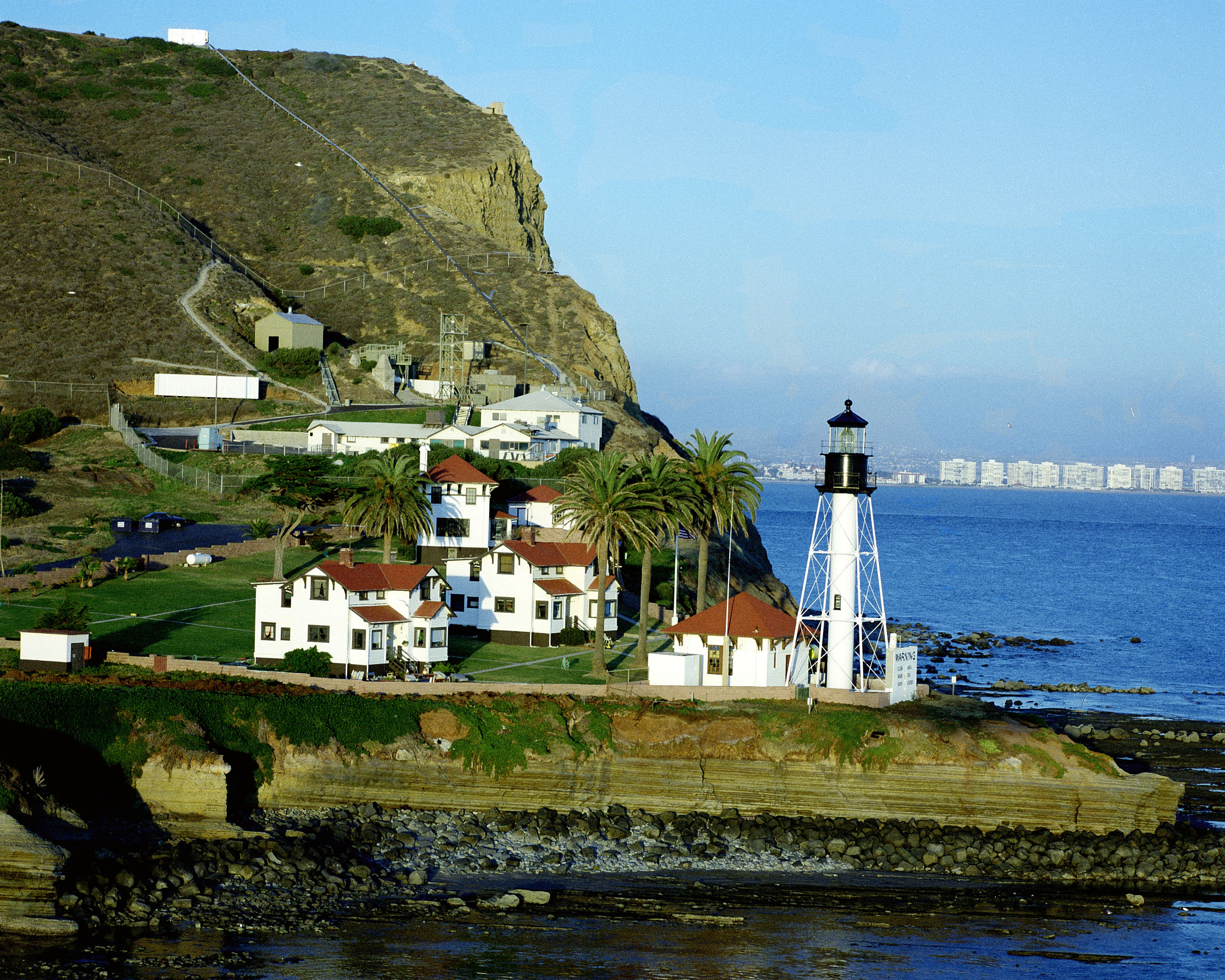
- Location: Point Loma, San Diego, California, United States
- Coordinates: 32.665071°N 117.242621°W

Tower
- Foundation: Concrete base
- Construction: Metal skeletal tower
- Automated: 1973
- Height: 70 feet (21 m)
- Shape: Square pyramidal tower with central cylinder, balcony and lantern
- Markings: White tower, black lantern and watch room
- Operator: United States Coast Guard
- Fog signal: 1 blast every 30s.

Light
- First lit: 1891
- Focal height: 88 feet (27 m)
- Lens: Third order Fresnel lens (original), VLB-44 (current)
- Range: 22 nautical miles (41 km; 25 mi)
- Characteristic: Fl W 15s.

The New Point Loma Lighthouse (officially Point Loma Light) is a lighthouse at the southern tip of the Point Loma peninsula in San Diego, California.

== History ==
It was first lighted on March 23, 1891, replacing the Old Point Loma Lighthouse which is atop the 400 feet (120 m) cliffs of Point Loma; the old lighthouse was often obscured by fog. The new light is only 88 feet (27 m) above the water. The first lighthouse keeper was Robert Decatur Israel, who had been keeper at the old lighthouse for 18 years.

The original light was 600,000 candlepower and could be seen at a distance of approximately 15 nautical miles. There was also a two-tone diaphone fog horn and living quarters for several families.

The structure is the only pyramidal skeletal lighthouse remaining on the West Coast. It is very similar to Coney Island Light, Plum Island Range Rear Light, La Pointe Light, and Duluth South Breakwater Inner Light, all of which were built at about the same time. The latter three of these are all on the National Register of Historic Places.

The light was automated in 1973. In February 2013, the light that had been in use since 1999 was replaced with a VLB-44. The LED apparatus reduces the maintenance cost of the lighthouse and is brighter than the previous light.

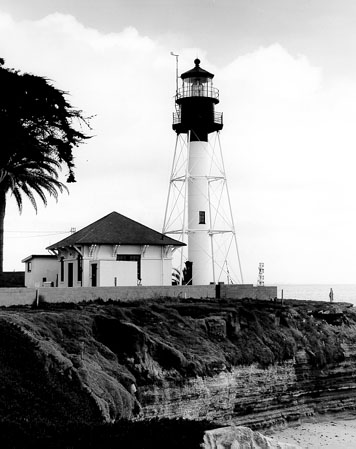
Undated USCG photo

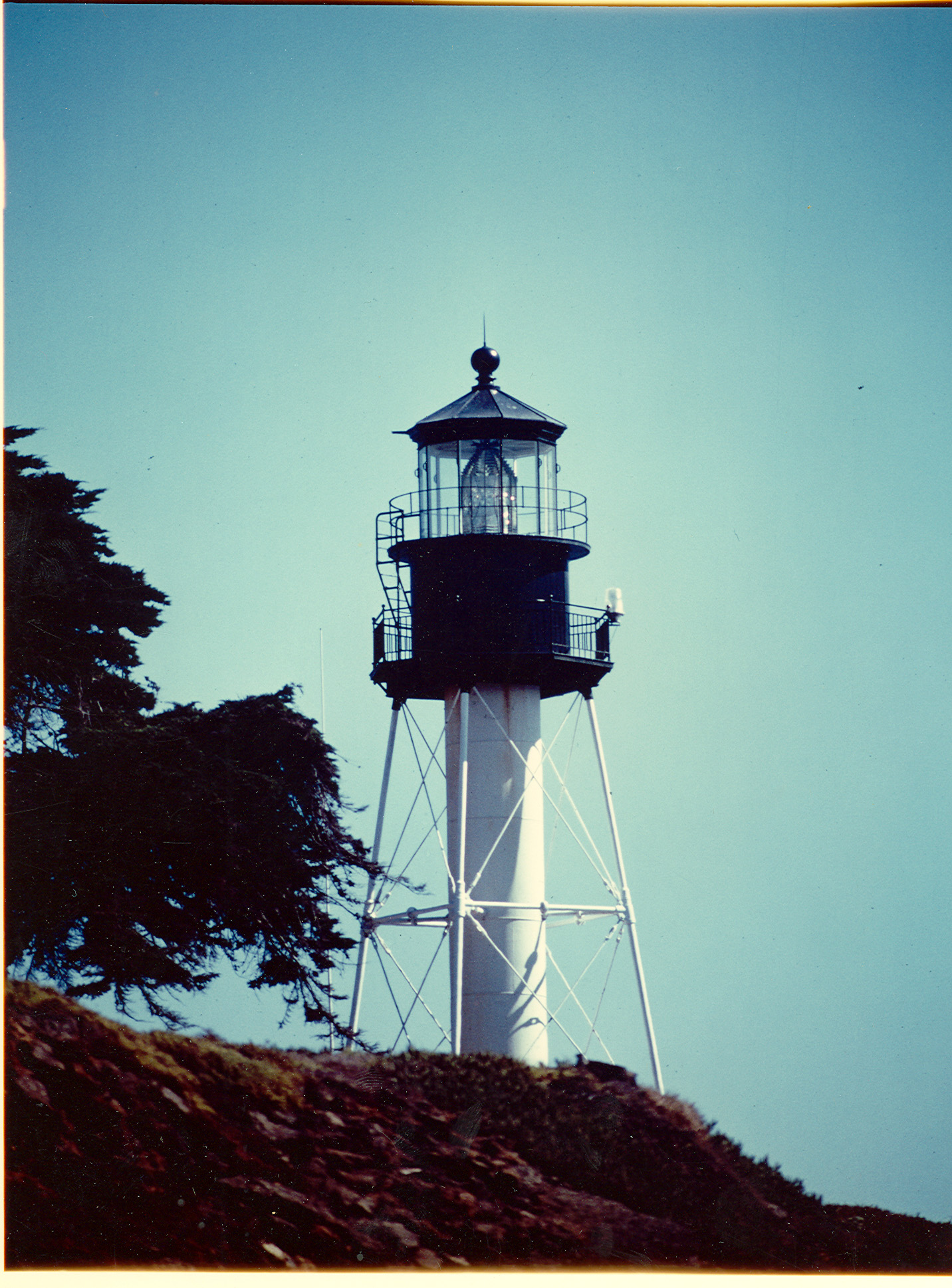
Undated USCG photo

== In popular culture ==
The living quarters at the New Point Loma Lighthouse were featured in the 1986 movie Top Gun as Viper's home (played by actor Tom Skerritt)

== See also ==
- List of lighthouses in the United States
