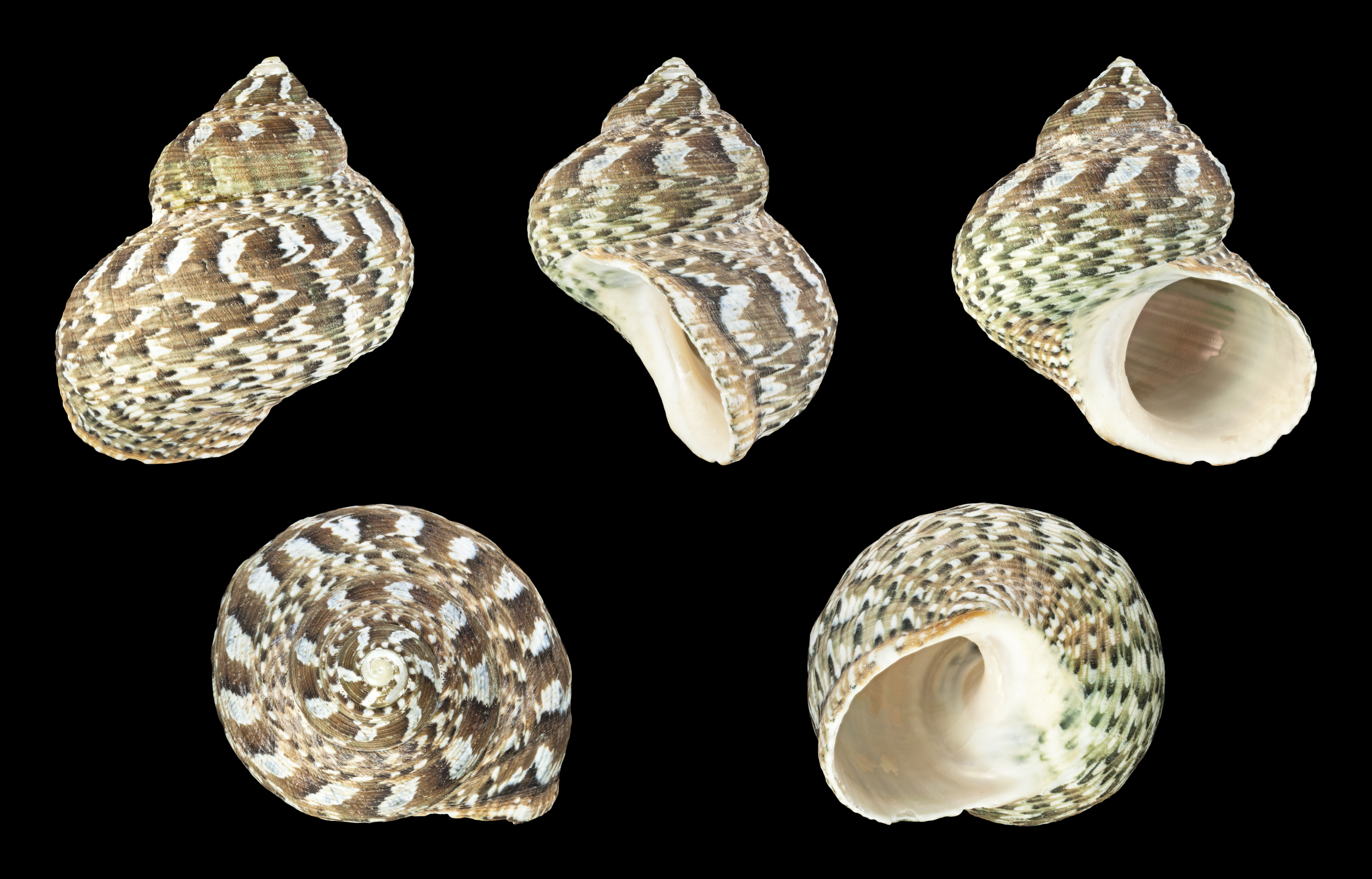

Scientific classification
- Kingdom: Animalia
- Phylum: Mollusca
- Class: Gastropoda
- Subclass: Vetigastropoda
- Order: Trochida
- Family: Turbinidae
- Genus: Turbo
- Species: T. fluctuosus

Binomial name
- Turbo fluctuosus Wood, 1828

Synonyms
- Turbo (Callopoma) fluctuosus W. Wood, 1828; Turbo assimilis Kiener, 1847; Turbo fluctuatus Reeve, 1848; Turbo fokkesi Jonas, 1843; Turbo moltkianus Reeve, 1848; Turbo tessellatus Kiener, 1848

= Turbo fluctuosus =

Species of gastropod

Turbo fluctuosus, common name the wavy turban, is a species of sea snail, marine gastropod mollusk in the family Turbinidae.

== Description ==
The length of the shell varies between 25 mm and 86 mm. The short, solid, imperforate shell has an ovate-conic shape with a conic spire. Its color pattern is olivaceous, green, brown or grayish, longitudinally strigate or tessellate with white. The five whorls are generally angulate and nodose at the shoulder, with a varying number of coarse subnodose revolving carinae and of intermediate lirulae upon the median and lower portions of the body whorl. The large aperture is iridescent within. The white columella is wide, and slightly produced at the base. It has a longitudinal excavation or groove upon its face.

The operculum is rounded oval, with four whorls and a subcentral nucleus. Its outer surface is convex. The central portion is elevated, white, sharply granulate, and bounded by a wide groove which connects with a deep central pit by a lunate channel. Outside of this is a zone bearing about six narrow concentric beaded green lirulae, which are not continuous over the side of increment.

== Distribution ==
This species occurs in the Pacific Ocean from Baja California peninsula to Peru and off the Galapagos archipelago.
