= Charlotte Amalie (subdistrict), U.S. Virgin Islands =

Subdistrict of the U.S. Virgin Islands

Charlotte Amalie
- Subdistrict
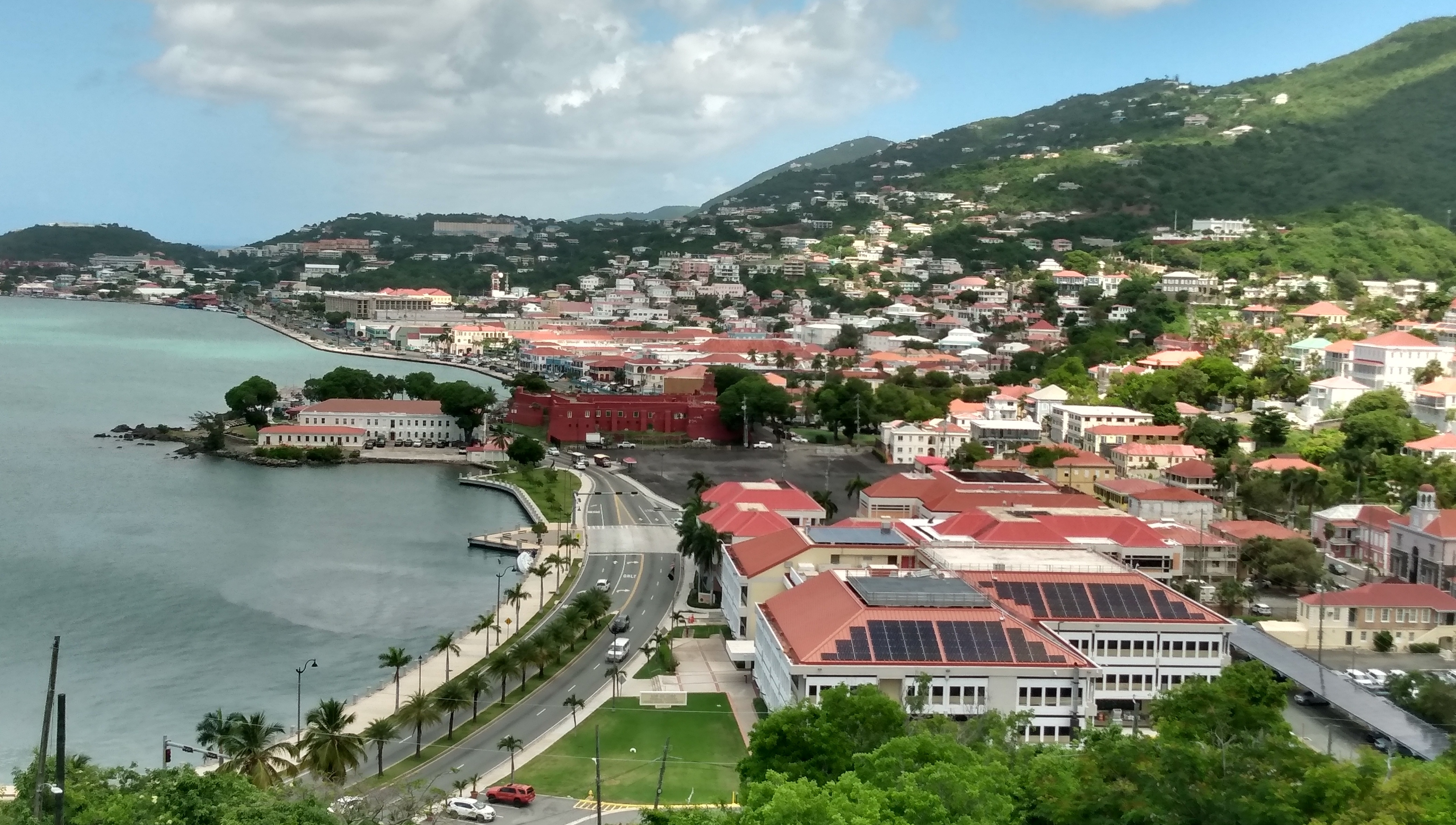
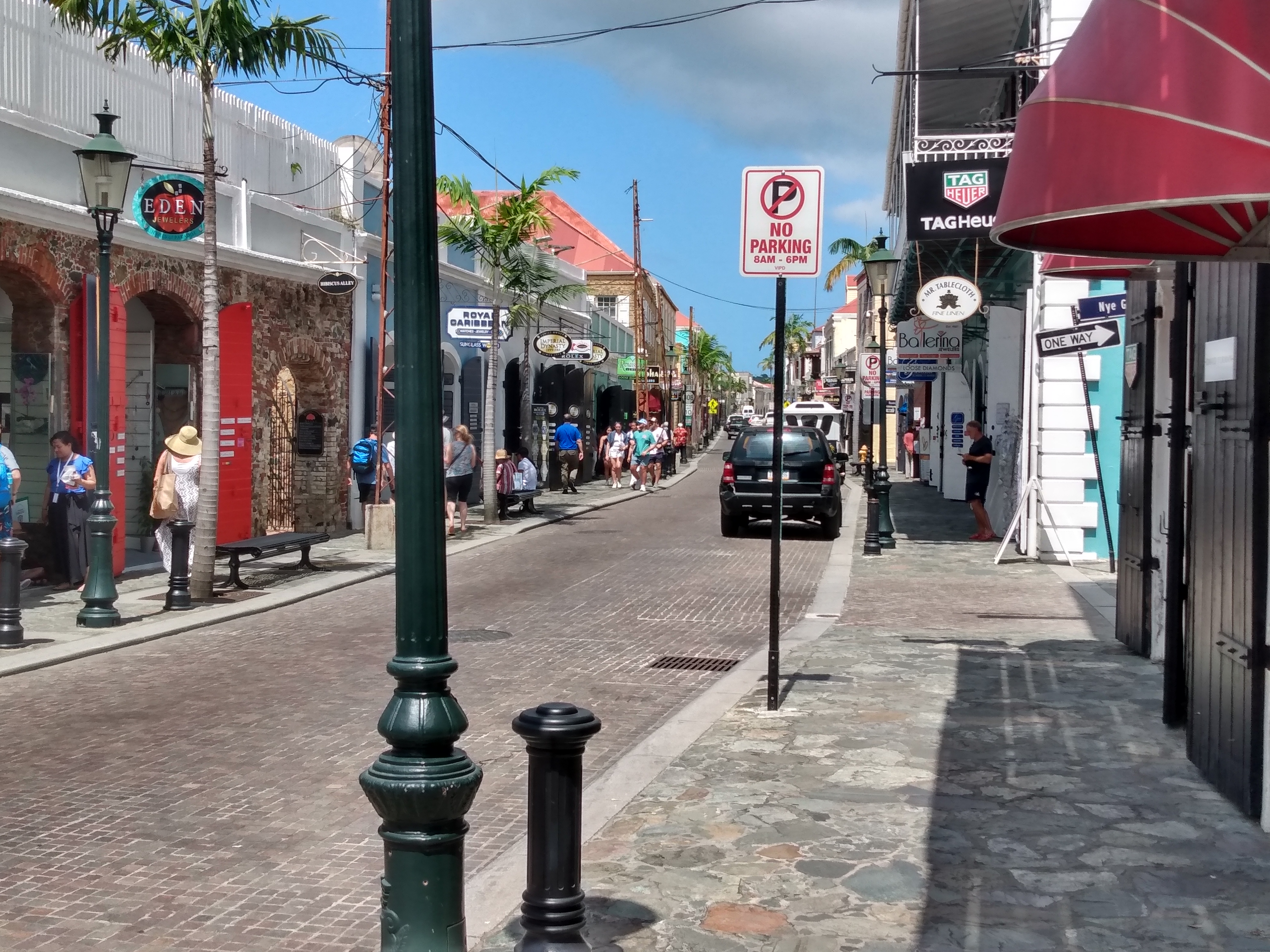
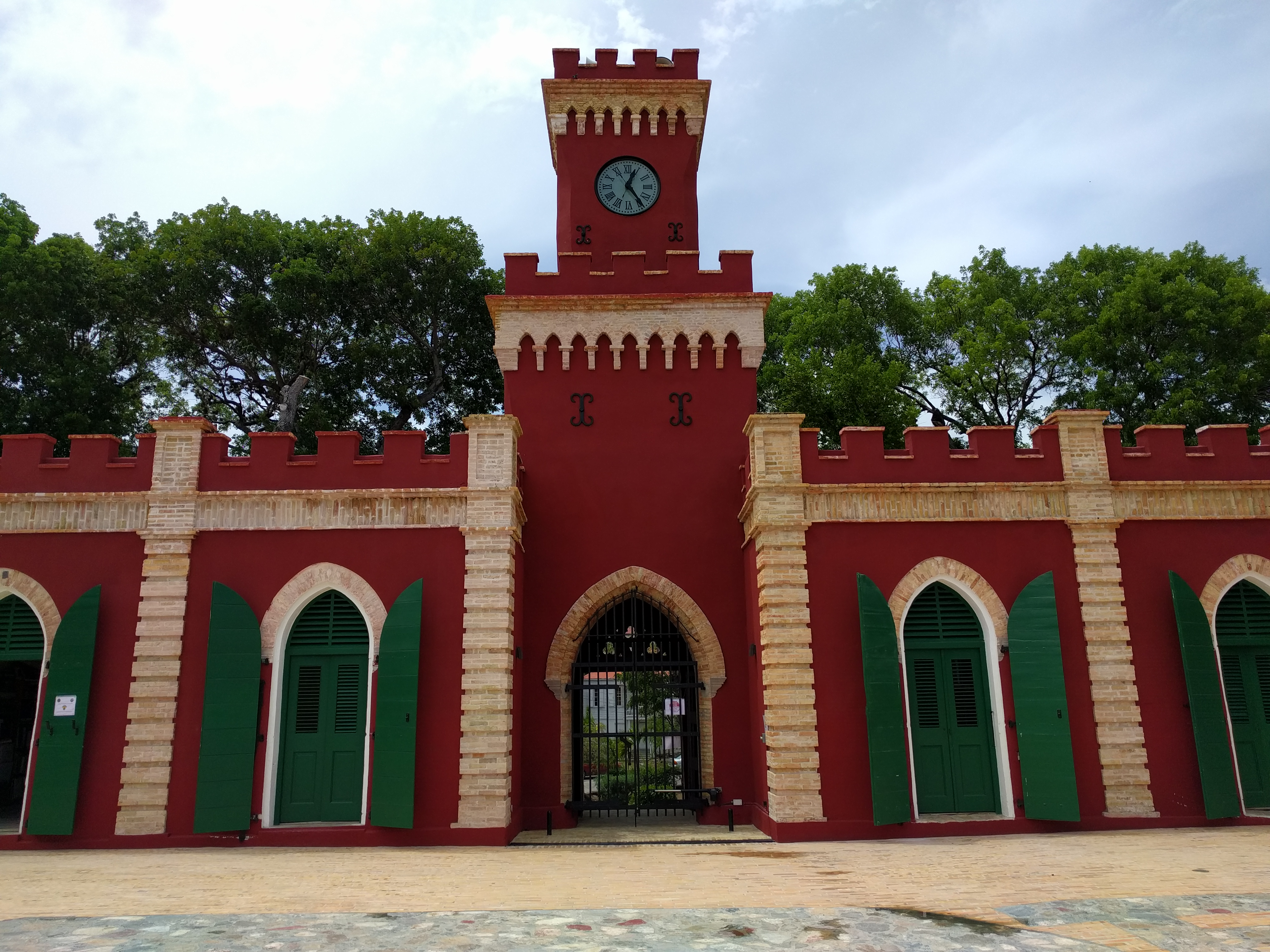
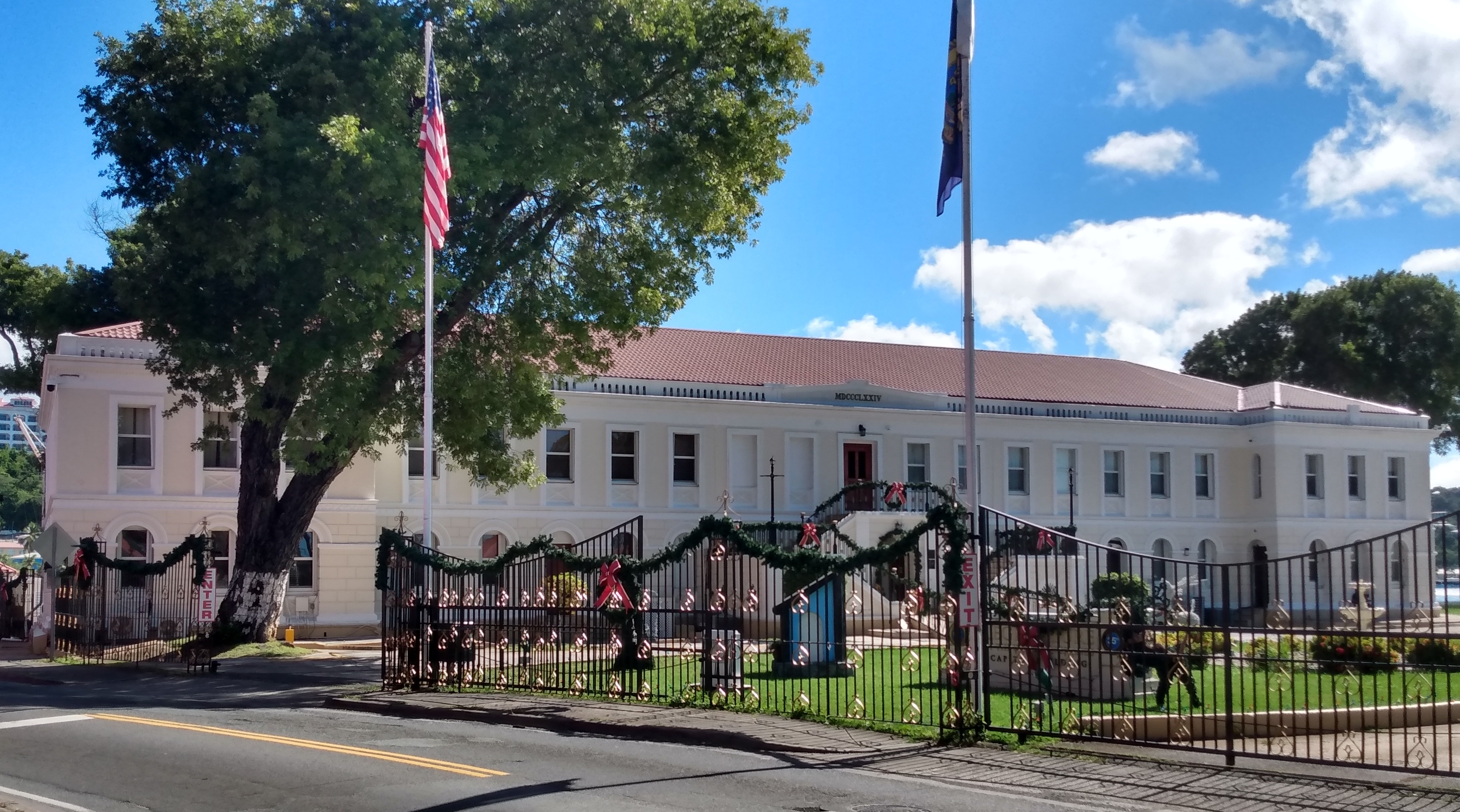
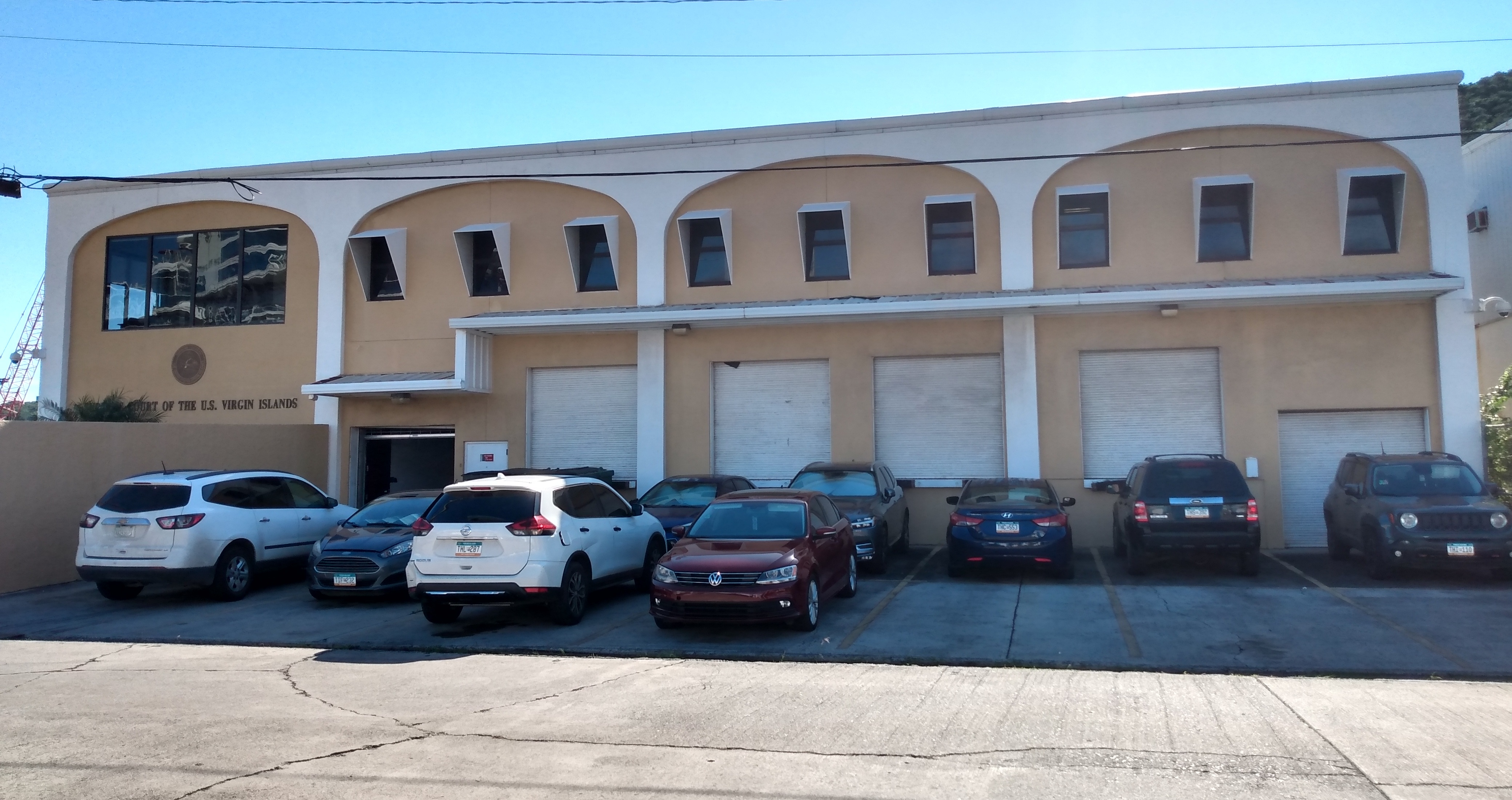
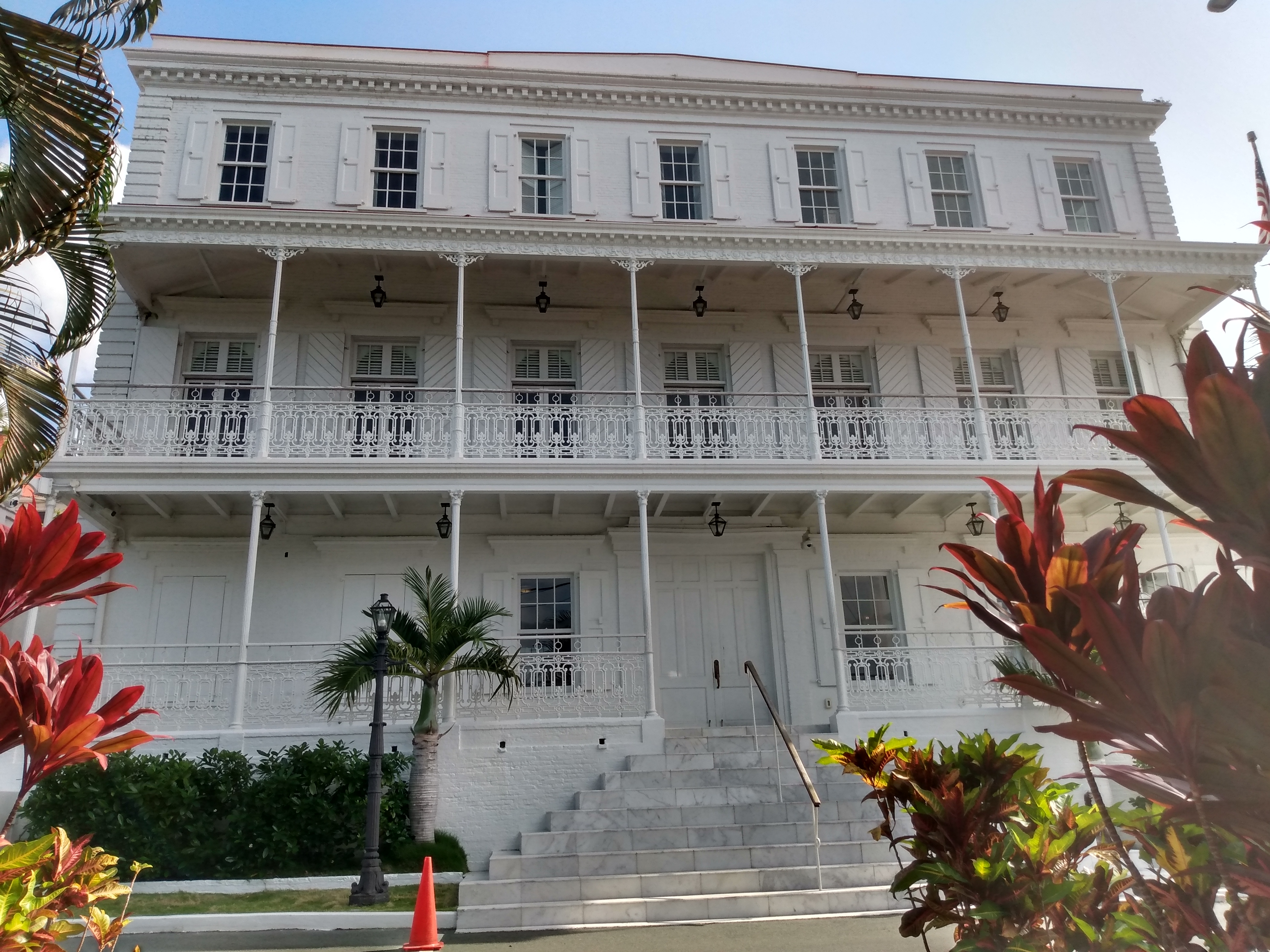
- Downtown Charlotte Amalie The historic town of Charlotte Amalie Fort Christian US Virgin Islands Capitol Building Supreme Court of the US Virgin Islands Governor's Mansion Havensight and WICO Dock
- Nicknames: The City; The City of Charlotte Amalie
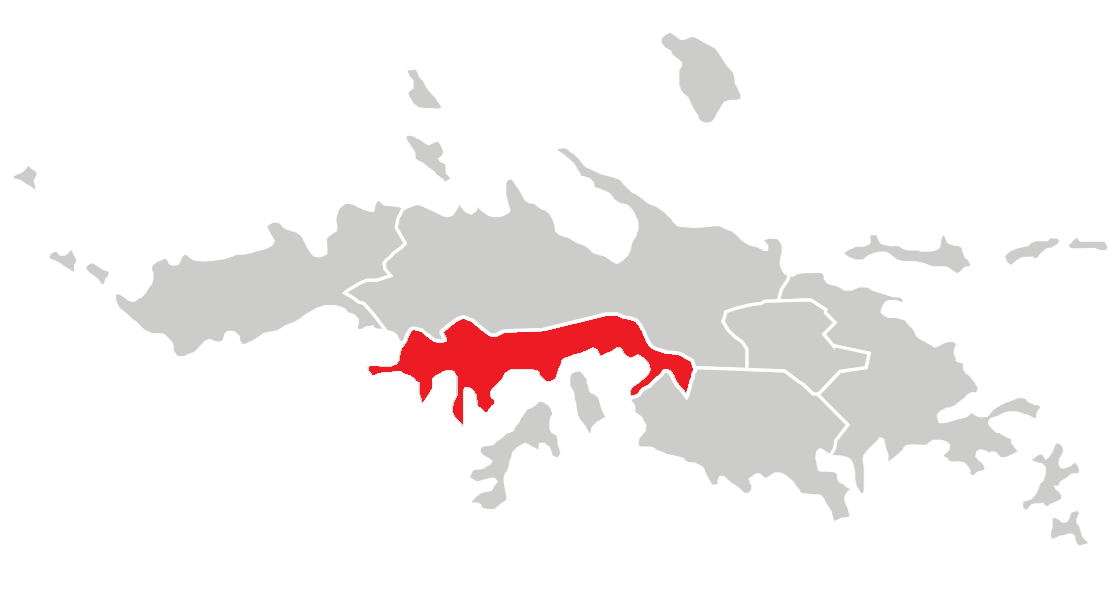
- Location of the subdistrict of Charlotte Amalie on the island of St. Thomas

- Location within the U.S. Virgin Islands Location within North America
- Coordinates: 18°20′N 64°56′W
- Sovereign state: United States
- Territory: U.S. Virgin Islands
- Administrative District: Saint Thomas-Saint John
- Island (Census District): Saint Thomas

Area
  - Subdistrict: 3.36 sq mi (8.7 km^{2})
- Elevation: 49 ft (15 m)

Population (2020)
  - Subdistrict: 14,477
  - Density: 4,310/sq mi (1,660/km^{2})
  - Metro: 42,261 (St. Thomas)
- Time zone: UTC−4 (AST)
- ZIP Codes: 00801, 00802, 00803, 00804
- Area codes: 340
- FIPS code: 78-030-17200
- GNIS feature ID: 1939757

The subdistrict of Charlotte Amalie is one of the seven administrative subdistricts located on the island of St. Thomas. It serves as the modern day capital of the U.S. Virgin Islands. It is also the largest population center and the largest settlement in the entire Virgin Islands Archipelago. In 2020, it had a population of 14,477. It is located in south-central part of the island of St. Thomas surrounding the Charlotte Amalie Harbor on three sides.

The subdistrict of Charlotte Amalie is sometimes referred to as "the City of Charlotte Amalie" or "the City". The subdistrict is composed of the Census-Designated Places (CDPs) of Charlotte Amalie West and Charlotte Amalie East and the town of Charlotte Amalie.

Although the pre-US settlement of Charlotte Amalie has expanded eastward and westward since the early 20th century, the official boundaries of the town have remained unchanged. This is primarily due to the governance structure of the U.S. Virgin Islands, which does not provide for the incorporation of municipalities, which is a key component for town and city designation in the United States. Under US code however, Charlotte Amalie (the original settlement with its boundaries) is designated as a "town" largely due to its historical status under Danish colonial rule and its recognition by the U.S. government following the transfer of the islands in 1917. Since there is no municipal government or legal framework to expand town boundaries or incorporate surrounding areas, adjacent communities such as Charlotte Amalie East and Charlotte Amalie West are classified as separate census-designated places (CDPs) by the U.S. Census Bureau. As a result, the administrative subdistricts of Charlotte Amalie better reflects the physical and demographic growth of the broader settlement and why it is oftentimes referred to as "the City" even though it is not technically a city and why it is referred to as the modern day capital.

== History ==
The subdistrict of Charlotte Amalie, as recognized today, was established as part of a reorganization of the U.S. Virgin Islands' administrative divisions in 1979. The U.S. Virgin Islands government, by law, established the subdistricts in collaboration with the U.S. Census Bureau to better reflect the islands' terrain and population distribution. This led to the creation of 20 census subdistricts between the three main islands, including the subdistrict of Charlotte Amalie, which are now used as minor civil divisions (MCD) for statistical and administrative purposes. Each census subdistrict is assigned a three-digit census code in alphabetical order within the island and a five-digit FIPS code in alphabetical order within the Virgin Islands. The census code for the subdistrict of Charlotte Amalie is 78-030-17200 where 78 represents the U.S. Virgin Islands, 030 represents the island of St. Thomas, and 17200 represents the Charlotte Amalie subdistrict. This is not to be confused with the census code for the town of Charlotte Amalie that is 78-16300 where 78 represents the U.S. Virgin Islands and 16300 represents the town of Charlotte Amalie.

The subdistrict of Charlotte Amalie, encompassing the town of Charlotte Amalie along with Charlotte Amalie East and Charlotte Amalie West, represents the historical, cultural, and economic center of the island of St. Thomas, the district of St. Thomas-St. John and the U.S. Virgin Islands overall. The subdistrict's three distinct parts have their own unique history.

=== History of the town of Charlotte Amalie ===
Main: History of the town of Charlotte Amalie

Established in 1672 by the Danish West India Company and named after Queen Charlotte Amalie in 1691, the town developed around one of the Caribbean's most strategic deep natural harbor. Because of this harbor, the town of Charlotte Amalie, became a commercial center for regional and international trade, as well as the seat of government and civic activity.

=== History of Charlotte Amalie East ===
Main: History of the CDP of Charlotte Amalie East

To the east, Charlotte Amalie East saw a shift from plantation agriculture to maritime commerce in the 20th century, particularly with the development of the West Indian Company (WICO) dock in 1912. Built to accommodate larger steamships, this deepwater port allowed the island to emerge as a modern shipping and cruise destination. The area also hosted Camp Harwood, a small U.S. Navy installation that played a role during the American naval administration of the islands.

=== History of Charlotte Amalie West ===
Main: History of the CDP of Charlotte Amalie West

Charlotte Amalie West, originally a more rural and underdeveloped area on the west side of the town, became central to U.S. military operations after the 1917 purchase of the Virgin Islands. From 1917 through World War II, it hosted a significant naval and marine military presence, including submarine facility (now repurposed as the Crown Bay Cargo Port, Crown Bay Marina, and Crown Bay Cruise Port), a naval hospital (later repurposed as the Lindbergh Bay Hotel), and the development of what is now the Cyril E. King Airport—once known as Bourne Field, a major naval air station. Many of these installations were decommissioned after World War II, but they left a legacy in the form of infrastructure that still supports civilian use today for the island of St. Thomas and the St. Thomas-St. John district.

Collectively, the subdistrict of Charlotte Amalie embodies a blend of historical legacy and contemporary growth. From its colonial roots and architectural heritage to its evolution into a central hub for tourism and commerce, it continues to be a focal point of cultural and economic activity in the U.S. Virgin Islands.

== Geography ==
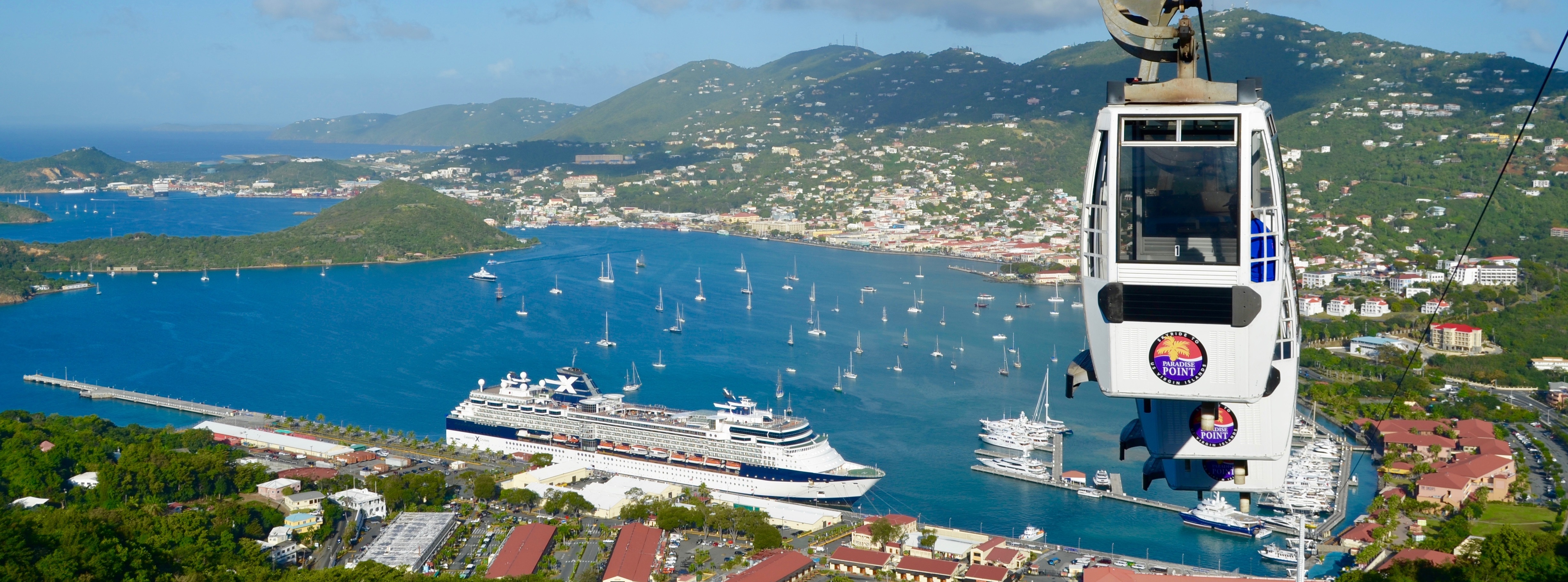
View of most of the subdistrict (Most of Charlotte Amalie West, most of the historic town of Charlotte Amalie, a small portion of Charlotte Amalie East) as seen from Paradise Point Skyride in Charlotte Amalie East
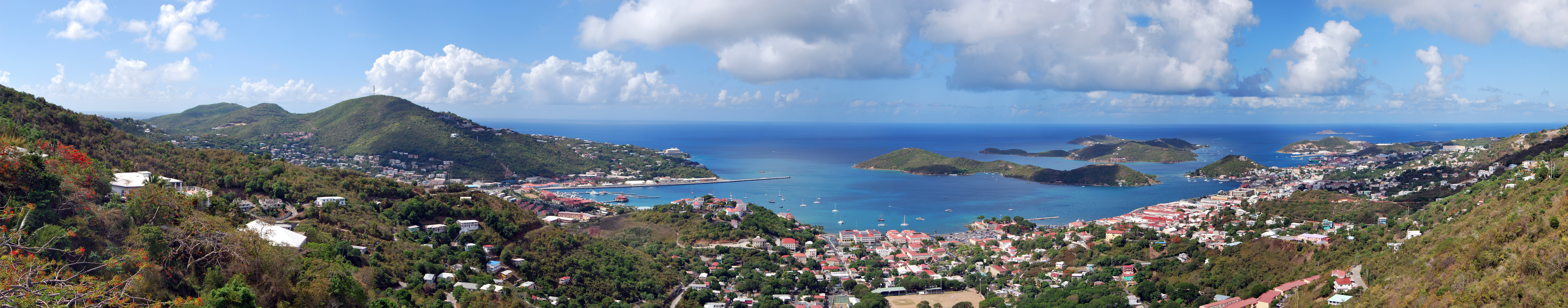
Panoramic view from Lookout Point of some of the subdistrict from route VI-40 above the town of Charlotte Amalie

=== Architecture ===
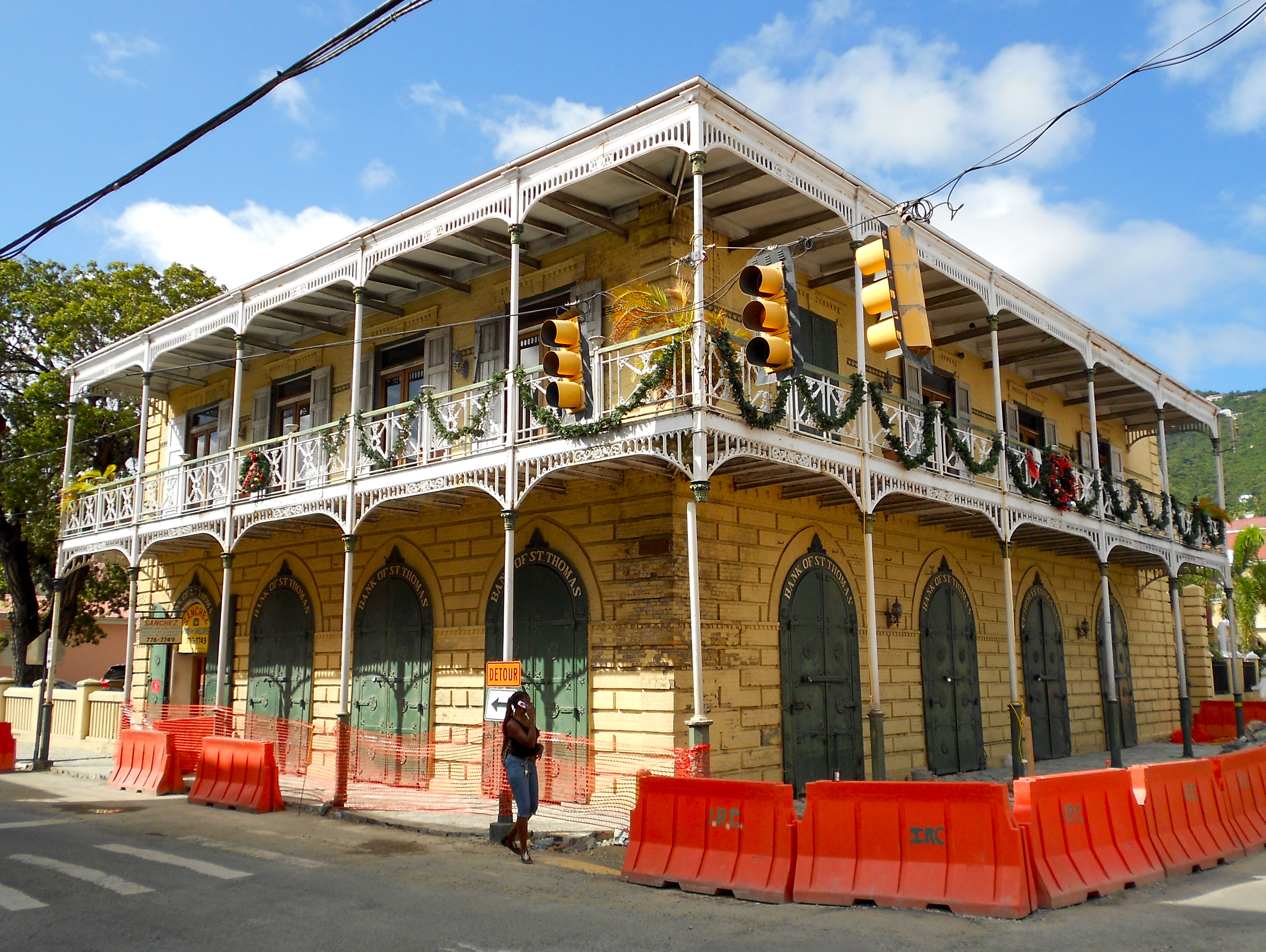
Colonial Architecture-Former Bank of St. Thomas branch location

The subdistrict of Charlotte Amalie reflects two distinct architectural eras. Downtown Charlotte Amalie in the town of Charlotte Amalie has the largest collection of colonial buildings in the Caribbean. Most of the buildings are classic Caribbean adaptions of English Georgian architecture built by the Danes with some Danish influences. Downtown Charlotte Amalie, particularly the area around Dronningens Gade (English: Queens Street a.k.a. "Main Street") and the historic waterfront, falls within a Historic and Cultural Conservation District and demolition of historic structures is highly restricted. Therefore, repurposing of building is significantly more common in these areas. Any construction must get approval from the Virgin Islands Historic Preservation Commission (VIHPC). Any new construction must adhere to architectural guidelines that maintain the area's historic Danish colonial character. On the other hand, outside of the downtown is construction is less restrictive and there are many newer American-syle architectural structures.

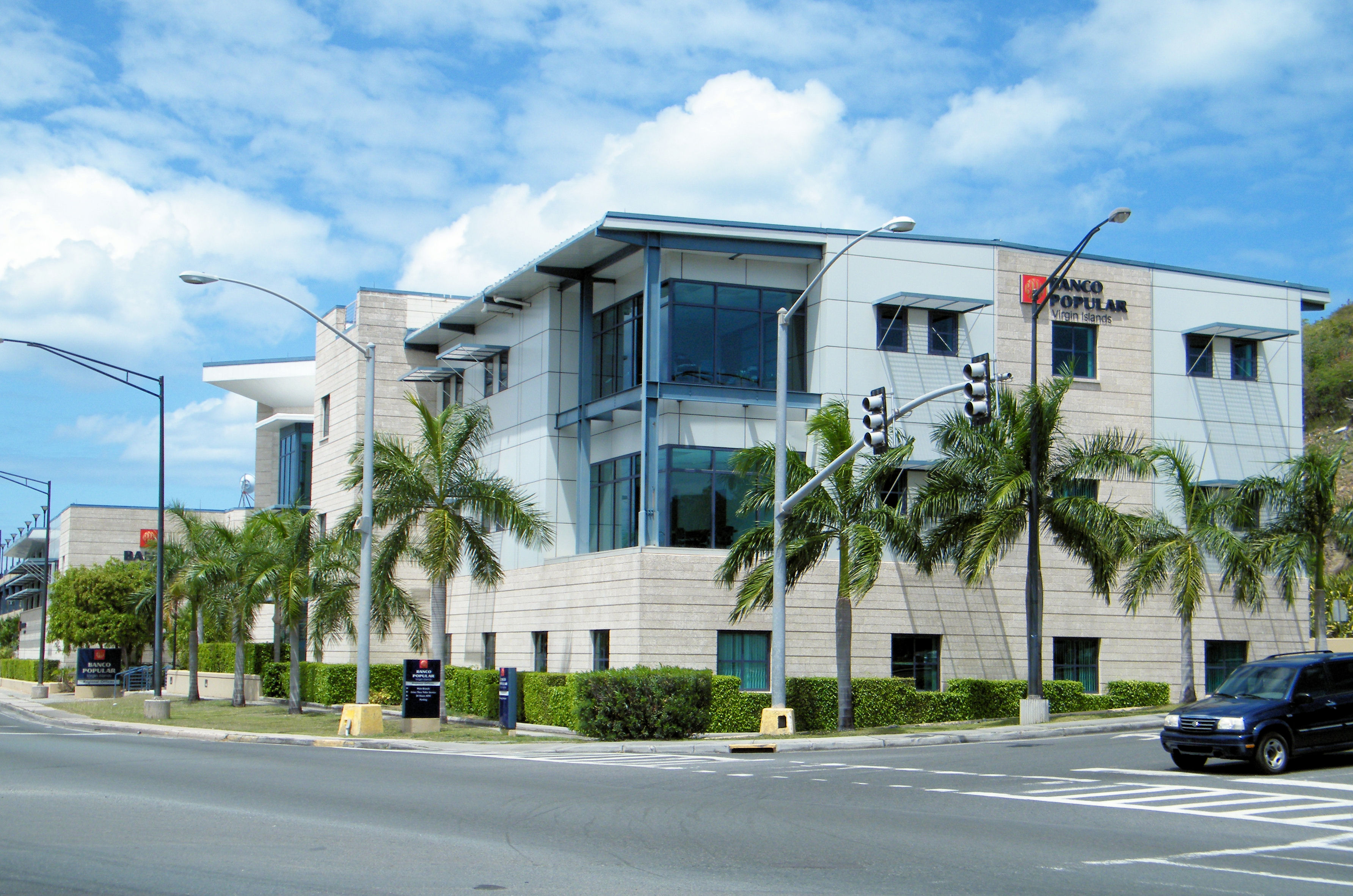
Modern Architecture-Banco Popular Regional (US and British Virgin Islands) Headquarters

The Charlotte Amalie subdistrict is well known for its beautiful landscapes and harbor views. Limiting building height helps preserve the natural beauty that attracts tourists and protects property values in the low rolling hills in the subdistrict and the mountains above the subdistrict. This reason is the main factor that contributes to the generally low-rise architecture in the subdistrict. According to current building codes downtown Charlotte Amalie buildings are restricted to a maximum height 3 stories or 53 feet. Outside the downtown area, up to 6 stories above-grade buildings are allowed. For these reason, along with the geographical nature of the subdistrict, there are currently no buildings above six stories.

== Demographics ==
Population history of Charlotte Amalie the subdistrict
Year	Pop.	±%
1980	19,304	—
1990	20,589	+6.7%
2000	18,914	−8.1%
2010	18,481	−2.3%
2020	14,477	−21.7%
Source: US Census Bureau

== Economy ==
The economy of the Charlotte Amalie subdistrict is the largest in the U.S. Virgin Islands, serving as the economic heart of St. Thomas and a major commercial hub for the entire territory. It is largely service-based, centered around tourism, government services, retail, and transportation, with smaller contributions from finance and education.

=== Tourism ===
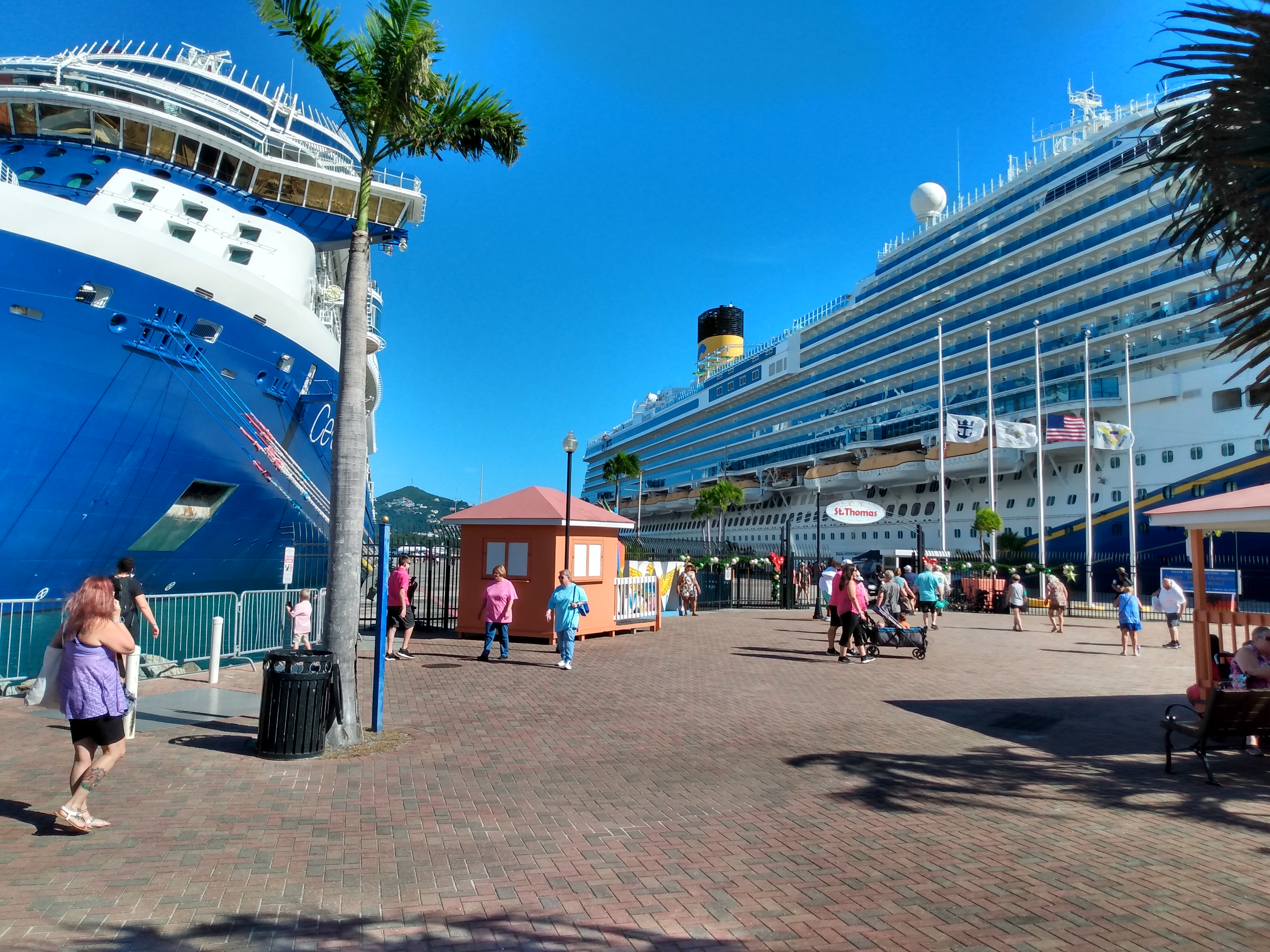
Crown Bay Cruise Port

Tourism is the largest economic driver in the subdistrict. The historic downtown of Charlotte Amalie is one of the most popular destinations in the Caribbean, known for its duty-free shopping, colonial architecture, and cultural landmarks. The subdistrict is home to both WICO's Havensight cruise ship dock (Charlotte Amalie East) and the Crown Bay Center (Charlotte Amalie West), making the subdistrict (more specifically the Charlotte Amalie Harbor) the third busiest cruise ship destination in the Caribbean, the third in the West Indies and the fifth busiest cruise port in the United States in 2023. The harbor also accommodates yachts and ferries, supporting a wide range of tourist services such as boat tours, restaurants, and attractions as well as dry dock facilities.

=== Logistics and Transportation ===
The presence of two seaports, including the Crown Bay cargo facility, makes Charlotte Amalie a center of maritime logistics and freight handling for the St. Thomas-St. John district. Additionally, travel between Water Island, St. John, and St. Croix commonly requires transit through the Charlotte Amalie subdistrict, making it a central hub for territorial passenger movement. Regionally, the subdistrict also serves as an alternative and often cheaper method of travel to the British Virgin Islands for passengers from United States as well as the main transportation hub for residents of St. Croix, Water Island to travel to the British Virgin Islands.

== Arts and Culture ==
=== Museums and Art Galleries ===
A list of Museums and Art Galleries in the subdistrict of Charlotte Amalie:
Town of Charlotte Amalie

- Fort Christian
- Saint Thomas Historical Trust Museum
- Camille Pissarro Gallery
- Seven Arches Museum
- Weibel Memorial Museum
- French Heritage Museum
- 81C Contemporary Art Gallery

Charlotte Amalie East

- Pirates Treasure Museum
- The Virgin Islands Children's Museum

=== Musical Arts ===
The Rising Stars Youth Steel Orchestra founded in 1981 by the U.S. Virgin Islands Territorial (now Superior) Court in Charlotte Amalie, is a celebrated youth music program focused on steel pan performance. Designed to provide structure and opportunity for young people, the group has earned a strong reputation both locally and internationally. Their performances span many genres, from Caribbean calypso to pop and classical music. The Rising Stars have performed at notable events such as the St. Thomas Carnival, President Clinton's visit to St. Thomas, the Tournament of Roses Parade in California, the US Capital Building, and at venues like the Lincoln Center and Javits Center.

=== Performing Arts and Theater ===
The Reichhold Center for the Arts is an open-air amphitheater located on the campus of the University of the Virgin Islands in St. Thomas. Opened in 1978 and named after philanthropist Henry Reichhold, the center has hosted a wide range of performances, from international concerts and theatrical productions to local cultural events. With seating for about 1,200 people, it became a major venue for the arts in the U.S. Virgin Islands. The center has been closed since sustaining significant hurricane damage in 2017, but renovations are underway.

=== Festivals ===
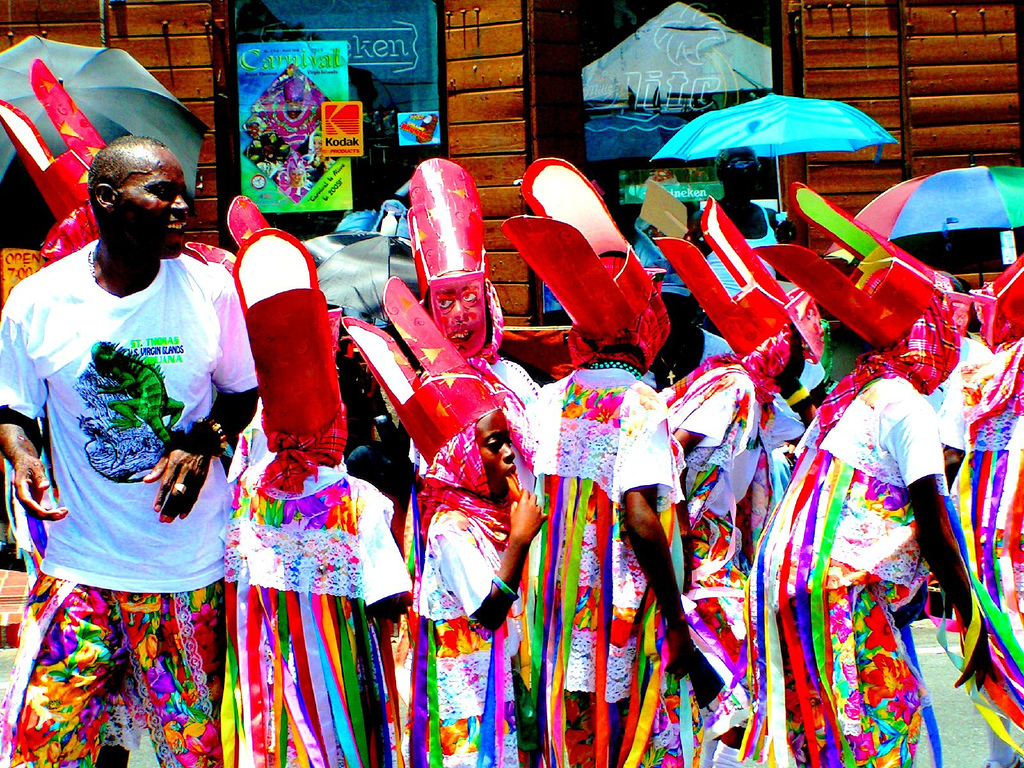
A St. Thomas children's Carnival troupe

The Virgin Islands Carnival, also known as the St. Thomas Carnival, is an annual cultural festival held on St. Thomas in the U.S. Virgin Islands, typically from April to early May. Events include music, food, parades and pageants, and the festival reflects a mixture of Caribbean, African, and European cultural traditions.

The St. Thomas Carnival began in 1952, although earlier forms of celebration trace back to colonial times. It was revived as a post-war community initiative to foster unity, preserve cultural heritage, and boost tourism at the end of the tourist season for the Caribbean. Today, it's a cornerstone of Virgin Islands identity, drawing thousands of locals, visitors, and diaspora back home to celebrate.

The majority of events take place in the subdistrict of Charlotte Amalie, most in the town of Charlotte Amalie and a few in Charlotte Amalie West. Some key events include:

- Calypso and Soca Monarch Competitions – Artists compete in lyrical battles for the crown.
- Carnival Queen, Prince & Princess Competitions - Pageants where local youth compete in talent, evening wear, and interview segments.
- J’ouvert (Jouvert) – A lively pre-dawn street party featuring paint, music trucks, and dancing in the streets.
- Children's and Adult Parades – Spectacular parades with elaborate costumes, dance troupes, moko jumbies, and steel pan bands.
- Food Fair – A massive culinary celebration featuring local dishes.
- Village Nights – A temporary Carnival Village is built (in the Fort Christian parking area), filled with food and drink booths, music, and free nightly performances from local, regional, and international artists performing music in many different genres (example: Quelbe (aka Fungi), Calypso, Soca, Reggae, Salsa, Merengue, Zouk, Compas (Kompas), Afrobeats, and more) reflecting the diverse people of the US Virgin Islands. For more than 10 years, the live performances have been live-streamed online for free.
- Boat Races – A vibrant and festive regatta-style event typically featuring traditional wooden boats and modern crafts competing in the waters in the Charlotte Amalie Harbor and around St. Thomas, celebrating the island's deep maritime heritage..
- Fireworks Show – Held on the final night of Carnival, the spectacular fireworks display over the Charlotte Amalie Harbor serves as a grand finale, drawing thousands of onlookers to the waterfront.
- Horse Races - This is the only event regularly held outside of the subdistrict. A unique Carnival tradition in the US and British Virgin Islands, held at the Clinton E. Phipps Racetrack in the East End subdistrict of St. Thomas.

== Government ==
Like the rest of the U.S. Virgin Islands, the subdistrict of Charlotte Amalie has no local government and is directly administered by the territorial government.

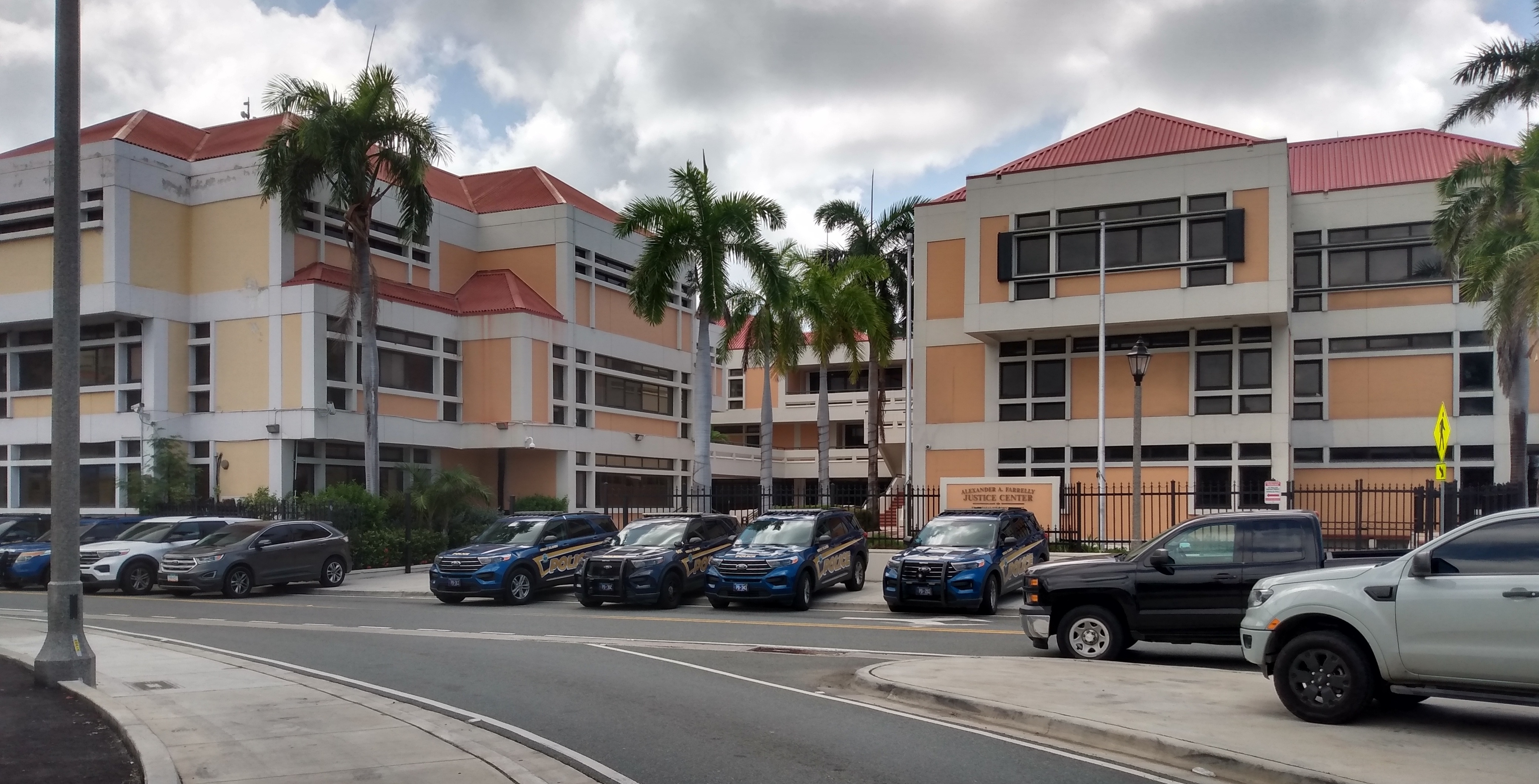
Alexander Farrelly Justice Center Complex

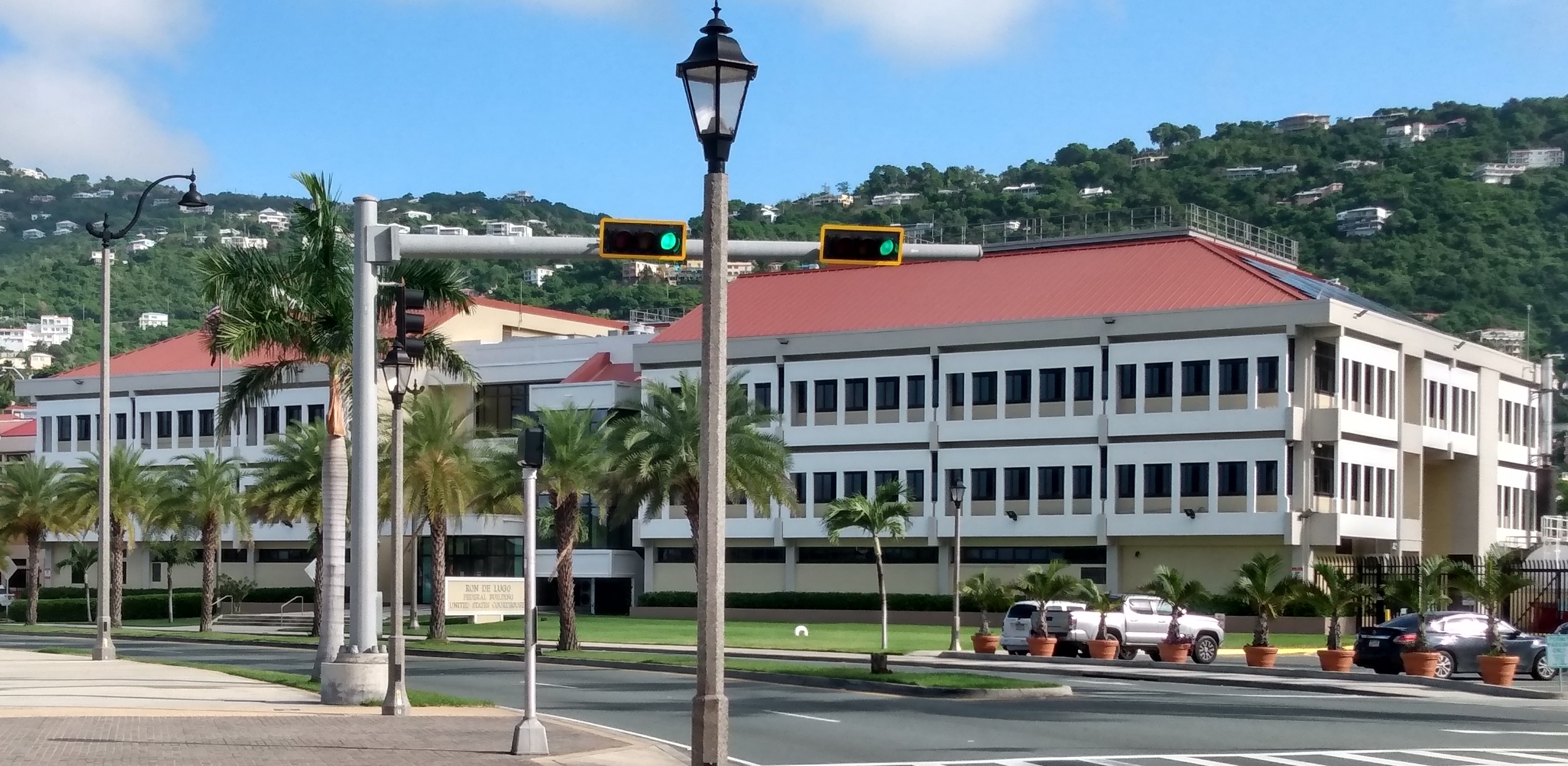
Ron DeLugo Federal Building and US District Court (St. Thomas-St. John)

As the modern day capital of the United States Virgin Islands, the subdistrict is the location for most of the territorial government departments headquarters. The US Virgin Islands Capitol building, is located in downtown Charlotte Amalie. The US Virgin Islands Supreme Court administrative building is located in Charlotte Amalie West while the United States Virgin Islands Superior Court (St. Thomas - St. John courts) and the United States Virgin Islands Department of Justice headquarters are located in downtown Charlotte Amalie in the Alexander A Farrelly Justice Complex. The Governor's St. Thomas Mansion as well as the Lt. Governor's St.Thomas-St. John office are also in downtown Charlotte Amalie. In addition to these portions of the territorial government, the U.S. Virgin Islands Department of Education, U.S. Virgin Islands Department of Human Services and others also have their headquarters in the subdistrict.

The subdistrict also serves as the St. Thomas-St. John hub for many arms of the federal government, including the United States District Court of the Virgin Islands - St. Thomas-St. John District located in the Ron DeLugo Federal Building in downtown Charlotte Amalie.

=== Emergency Services ===
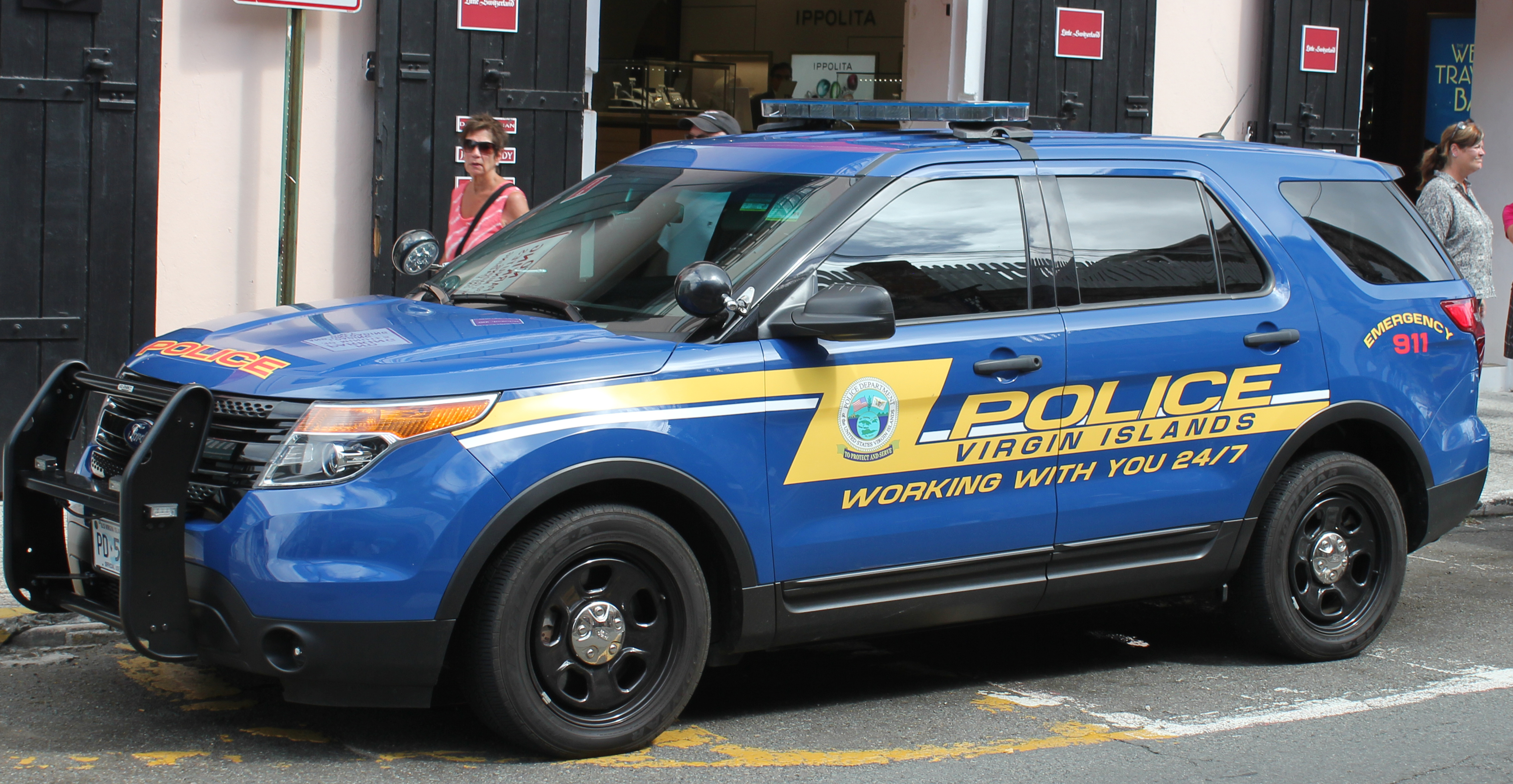
VIPD Ford Police Interceptor Utility on "Main Street" in Charlotte Amalie

The Virgin Islands Police Department (VIPD) serves as the primary law enforcement agency in the subdistrict of Charlotte Amalie. The department is tasked with maintaining public order, enforcing territorial laws, and conducting criminal investigations in the US Virgin Islands. The subdistrict is home to the VIPD's headquarters which operates out of the Alexander A. Farrelly Justice Complex in downtown Charlotte Amalie. The command functions as the central hub for administrative operations, investigations, and coordination of law enforcement activities across the district of St. Thomas-St. John and the entire U.S. Virgin Islands.

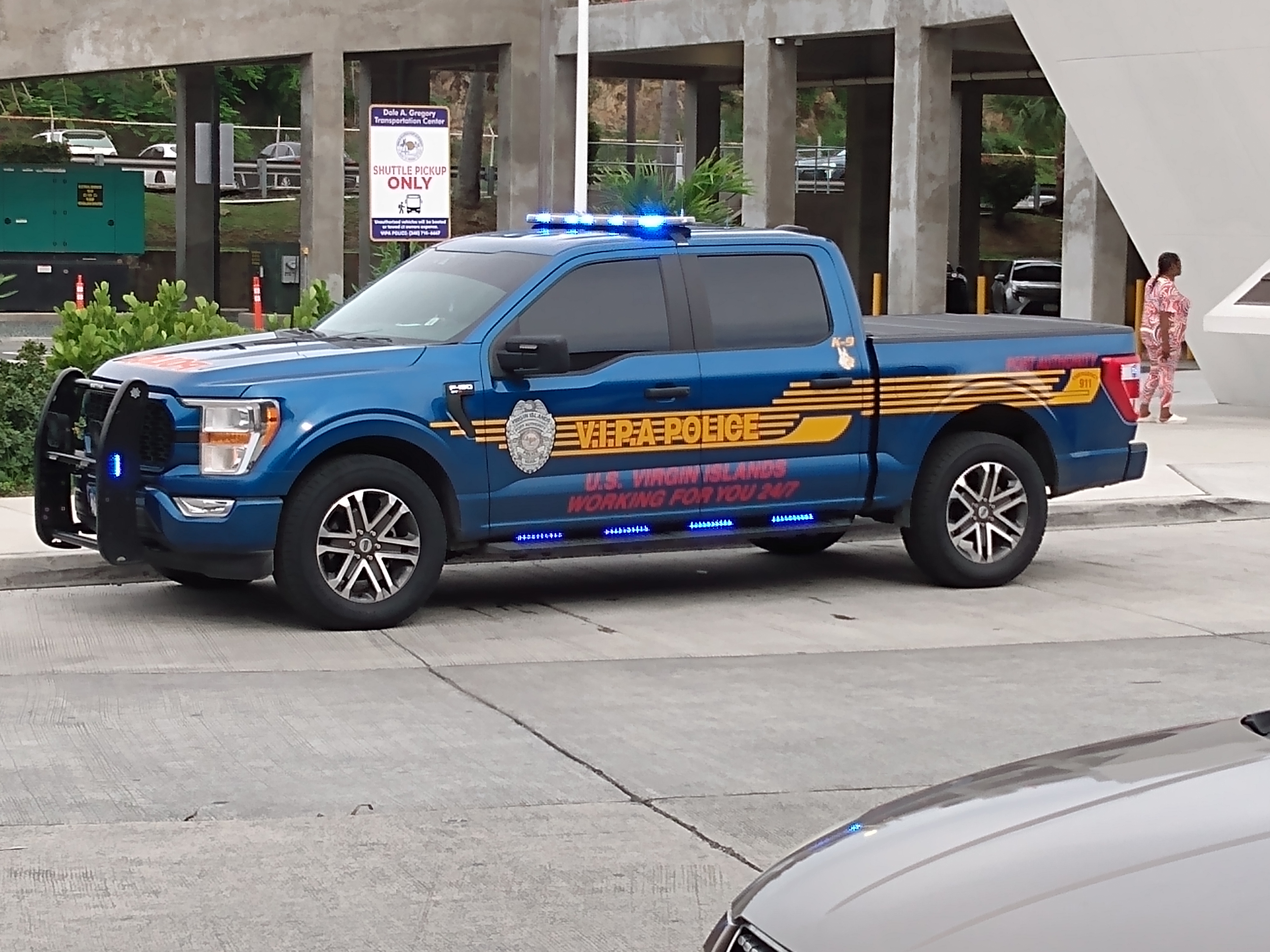
Virgin Islands Port Authority Police vehicle at the Cyril E King Airport

VIPD plays a crucial role in broader security efforts for the harbor and surrounding areas. The department regularly collaborates with federal agencies such as the Federal Bureau of Investigation (FBI), the Customs and Border Patrol (CBP), the Drug Enforcement Administration (DEA), and the United States Coast Guard to combat narcotics trafficking, organized crime, and ensure maritime security.

The Virgin Islands Port Authority Police Department (VIPA-PD) is a public law enforcement agency operated by the VIPA, which is an independent government agency of the U.S. Virgin Islands. They are responsible for maintaining safety and enforcing laws at the territory's seaports, airports, and other properties managed by the Virgin Islands Port Authority. Their jurisdiction includes maritime ports, airports, seaplane ports, and surrounding VIPA-managed facilities across the subdistrict and the US Virgin Islands. Their headquarters is in Charlotte Amalie West in the westside of the subdistrict.

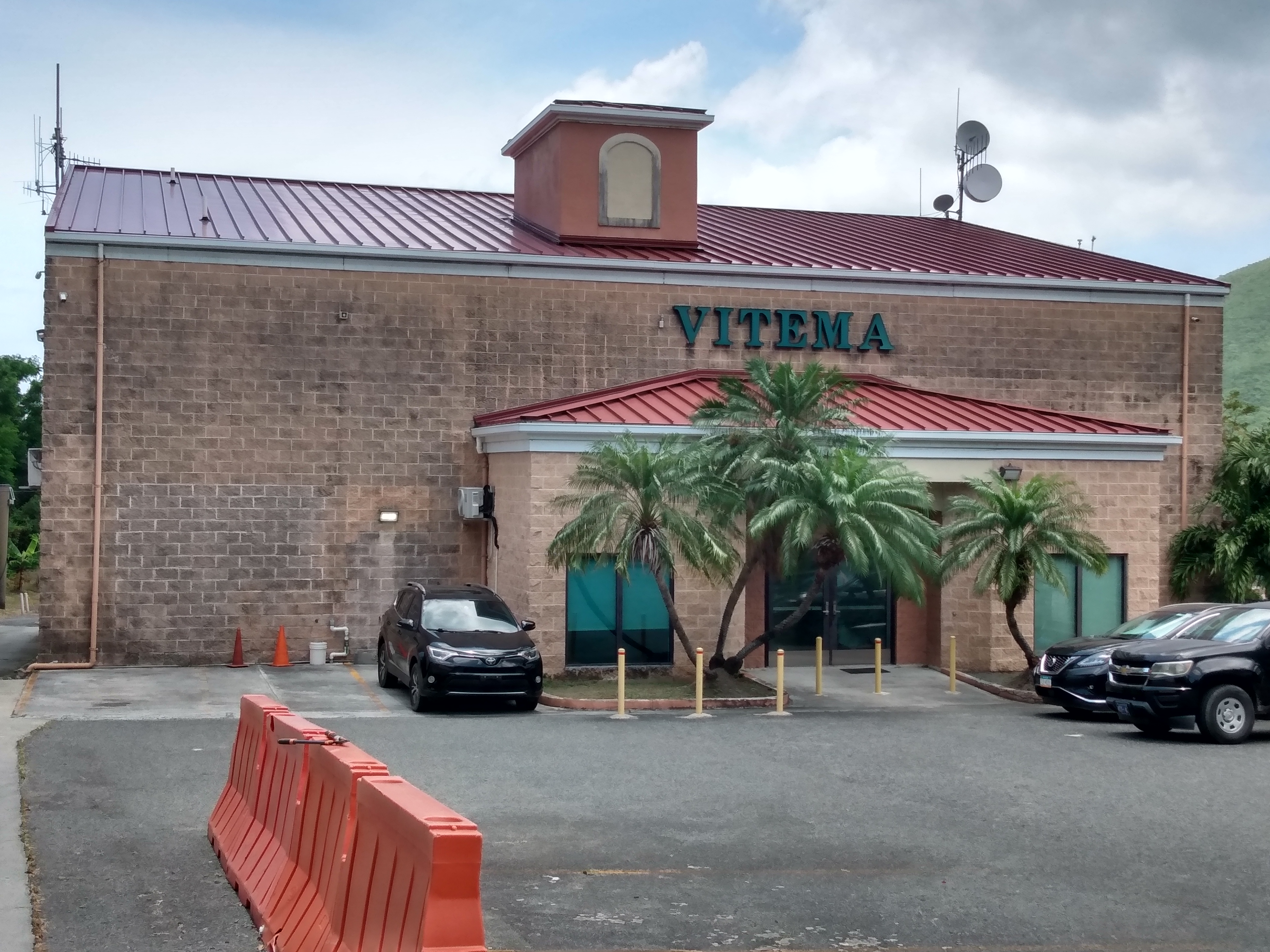
VITEMA Headquarters in Charlotte Amalie West

The Virgin Islands Territorial Emergency Management Agency (VITEMA) is the official emergency management and response agency for the United States Virgin Islands. It is tasked with coordinating disaster preparedness, response, recovery, and mitigation efforts across the territory. Strategically headquartered in Charlotte Amalie West just east of the Cyril E King Airport runway, close to the Crown Bay Container Port and on VI-30, the longest major route on the island on St. Thomas.

VITEMA oversees public alert systems, including the territory's VI-Alert notification platform, which delivers emergency warnings and updates . The agency also manages disaster drills, community training programs such as CERT (Community Emergency Response Teams), and the identification and preparation of emergency shelters.

VITEMA collaborates with the National Weather Service (NWS), U.S. Coast Guard, American Red Cross, and the Federal Emergency Management Agency (FEMA) to ensure a comprehensive, territory-wide approach to disaster readiness and response.

== Healthcare ==
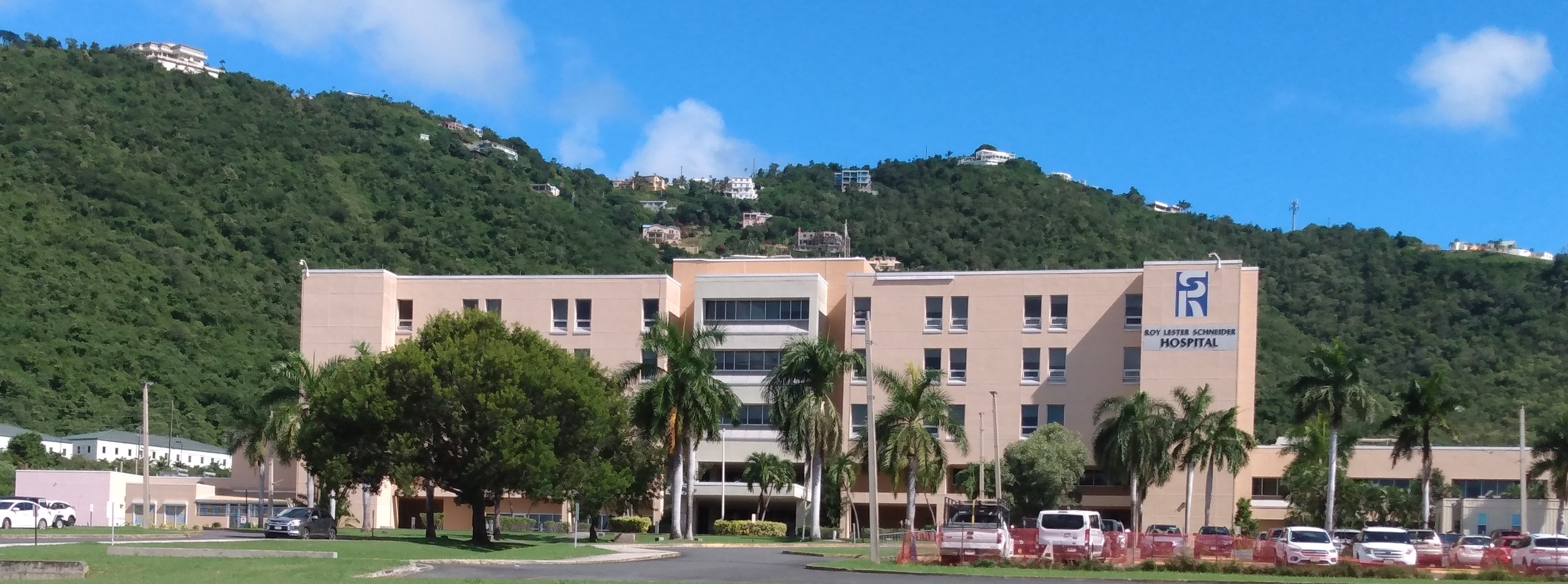
Roy Lester Schneider (RLS) Hospital

The Roy Lester Schneider Regional Medical Center (RLSRMC) is the only healthcare system serving the St. Thomas-St. John district, encompassing a network of three facilities dedicated to comprehensive medical care. The network is a public hospital network.

- Roy Lester Schneider (RLS) Hospital, the centerpiece of the system and located in the Charlotte Amalie subdistrict, is a 169-bed acute care facility, which provides a full range of services including emergency care, inpatient and outpatient treatment, diagnostic imaging, and specialized care in fields such as pediatrics, obstetrics, and surgery.
- Charlotte Kimelman Cancer Institute (CKCI) is also located in the Charlotte Amalie subdistrict. It is a state-of-the-art facility offering advanced oncology services, including diagnostics, chemotherapy, and radiation therapy.
- Myrah Keating Smith Community Health Center (MKSCH) on the island of St. John is the only part of the regional medical center not in the town of Charlotte Amalie.

== Education ==
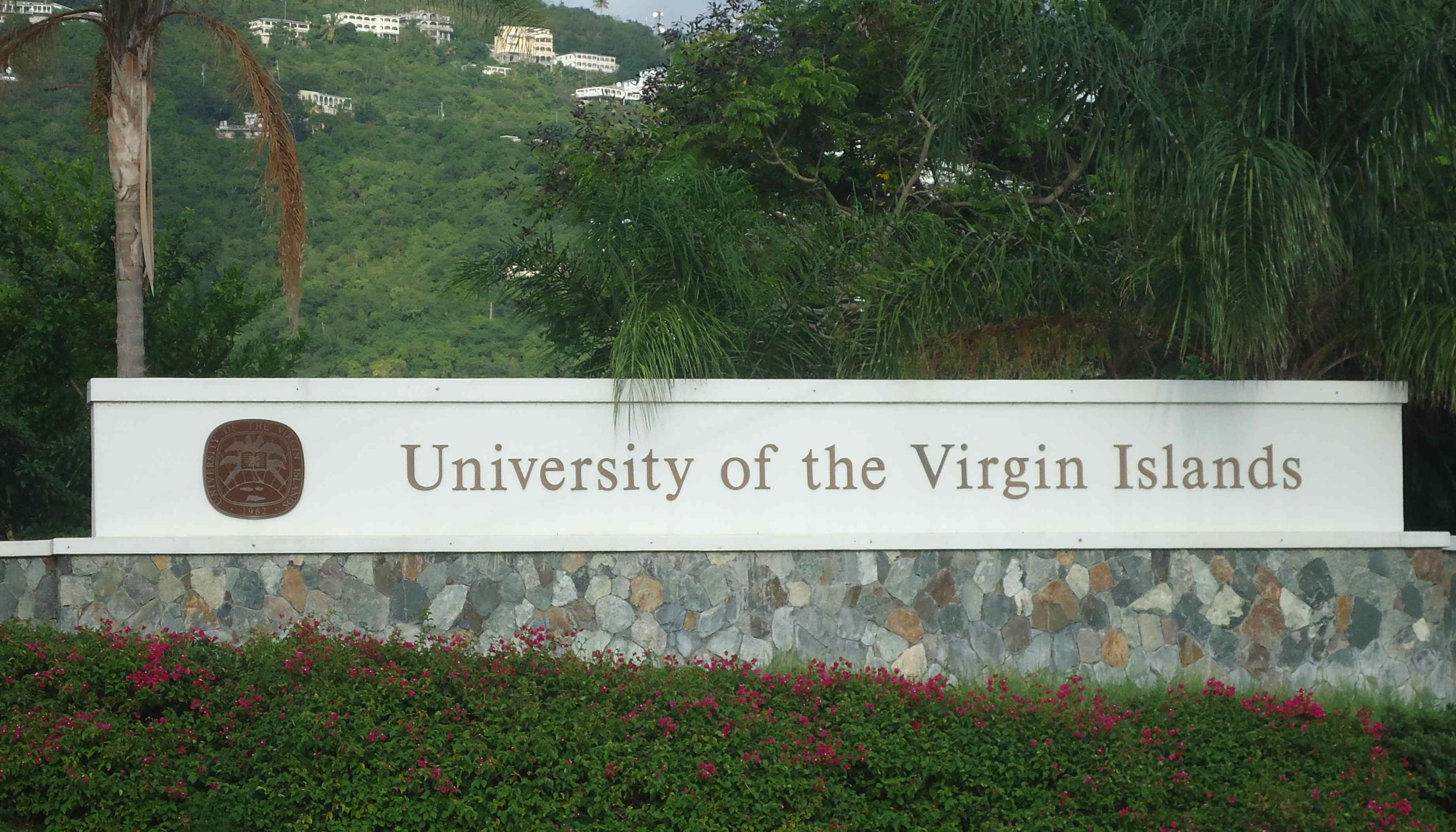
Entrance sign

=== Post Secondary Education ===
The University of the Virgin Islands (UVI) Orville Kean Campus, a 388-acre (1.57 km2) campus, was opened in 1963 in the subdistrict of Charlotte Amalie. At the time, it was named College of the Virgin Islands. The campus is situated on two hills and it has its own beach (John Brewer's Bay beach) which can be directly accessed off the main road which cuts through the campus. For this reason, UVI uses the slogan "Welcome to the Beach" because of this unique college campus feature.

UVI, the only public university serving the U.S. Virgin Islands, offers a diverse range of degree programs at both undergraduate and graduate levels. The institution offers associates, bachelors, and master's degrees. UVI also offers an Ed.D. (Doctor of Education) in Creative Leadership for Innovation and Change. Beyond degree programs, UVI offers certificates, continuing education, and workforce development initiatives tailored to the needs of the Virgin Islands and Caribbean region. UVI is regionally accredited by the Middle States Association of Colleges and Schools, ensuring its degrees meet rigorous academic standards.

=== Primary and Secondary Education ===
The subdistrict of Charlotte Amalie is also home to most of the schools in the St. Thomas-St. John School District and is the headquarters of the Virgin Islands Department of Education. The following schools are located in the subdistrict:

Elementary Schools

- Jane E Tuitt Elementary School
- Ulla F. Muller Elementary School

K-8 Schools

- Lockhart K-8 School

Junior High Schools:

- Addelita Cancryn Junior High School

High Schools

- Charlotte Amalie High School

Adult Education

- Raphael O. Wheatley Skill Center

Parochial and Private schools

- All Saints Cathedral School
- Sts. Peter & Paul Catholic School
- Calvary Christian Academy
- Moravian School

== Media ==
=== Television ===
Television stations licensed in the subdistrict of Charlotte Amalie are:

- WTJX 12.1 (PBS), 12.2 (PBS Kids), 12.3 (WTJX Business)
- WVXF-LD 17.1 (COZI TV), 17.2 (FOX),
- WVGN-LD 19 (NBC).
- WZVI 21 (Independent religious programming)

Note: LD is a low-power digital television stations and are very difficult to watch over-the-air even with a good outdoor antenna. WVXF and WVGN depend heavily on cable and satellite customers in the Virgin Islands instead.

=== Radio ===
The subdistrict of Charlotte Amalie is also home to several of Virgin Islands' major radio stations:

Radio Stations with licensed addresses or physical addresses in Charlotte Amalie
FM Only - Brand (Frequency)	AM Only - Brand (Frequency)	AM and FM - Brand (Frequencies)
WTJX-FM - NPR (93.1)	WVWI - Radio One (1000)	WGOD - WGOD Radio (97.9-FM and 1690-AM)
WWKS - KISS 96 (96.1)	WSTA - Lucky 13 (1340)	
WTJC - WTJC Radio (96.9)		
WZIN - Redentor (104.3)		
WVJZ - 105 JAMZ (105.3)		
WVIE - K-LOVE (107.3)		
WLDV - 107.9 Da Vybe (107.9)		

=== Newspaper ===
The Virgin Islands Daily News is the only daily newspaper in the United States Virgin Islands headquartered in the subdistrict of Charlotte Amalie. In 1995 the newspaper became one of the smallest ever to win journalism's most prestigious award, the Pulitzer Prize for Public Service.

== Sports ==
=== Semi-Professional Sports ===
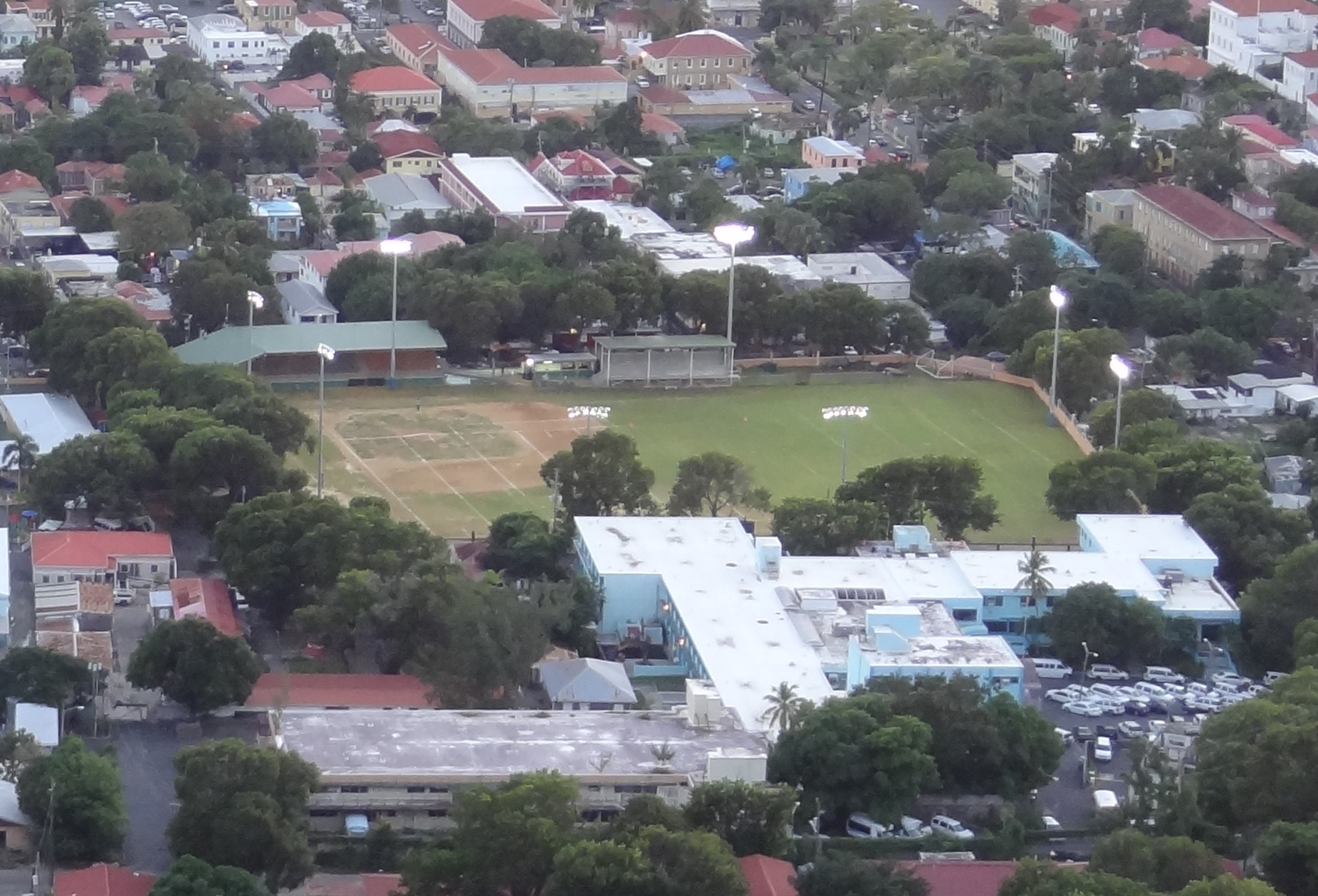
Lionel Roberts Stadium

The subdistrict of Charlotte Amalie serves as a central hub for organized soccer in the U.S. Virgin Islands. Several clubs based in the subdistrict compete in the U.S. Virgin Islands Association Club Championship, the territory's top-tier men's soccer competition. While the league is recognized by CONCACAF and FIFA, it is primarily semi-professional.

Semi-Professional Sports Teams
Team	Sport	League	Venue
New Vibes SC	Soccer	USVISF Premier League	Lionel Roberts Stadium
Raymix SC	Soccer	USVISF Premier League	Lionel Roberts Stadium

=== Collegiate Sports ===
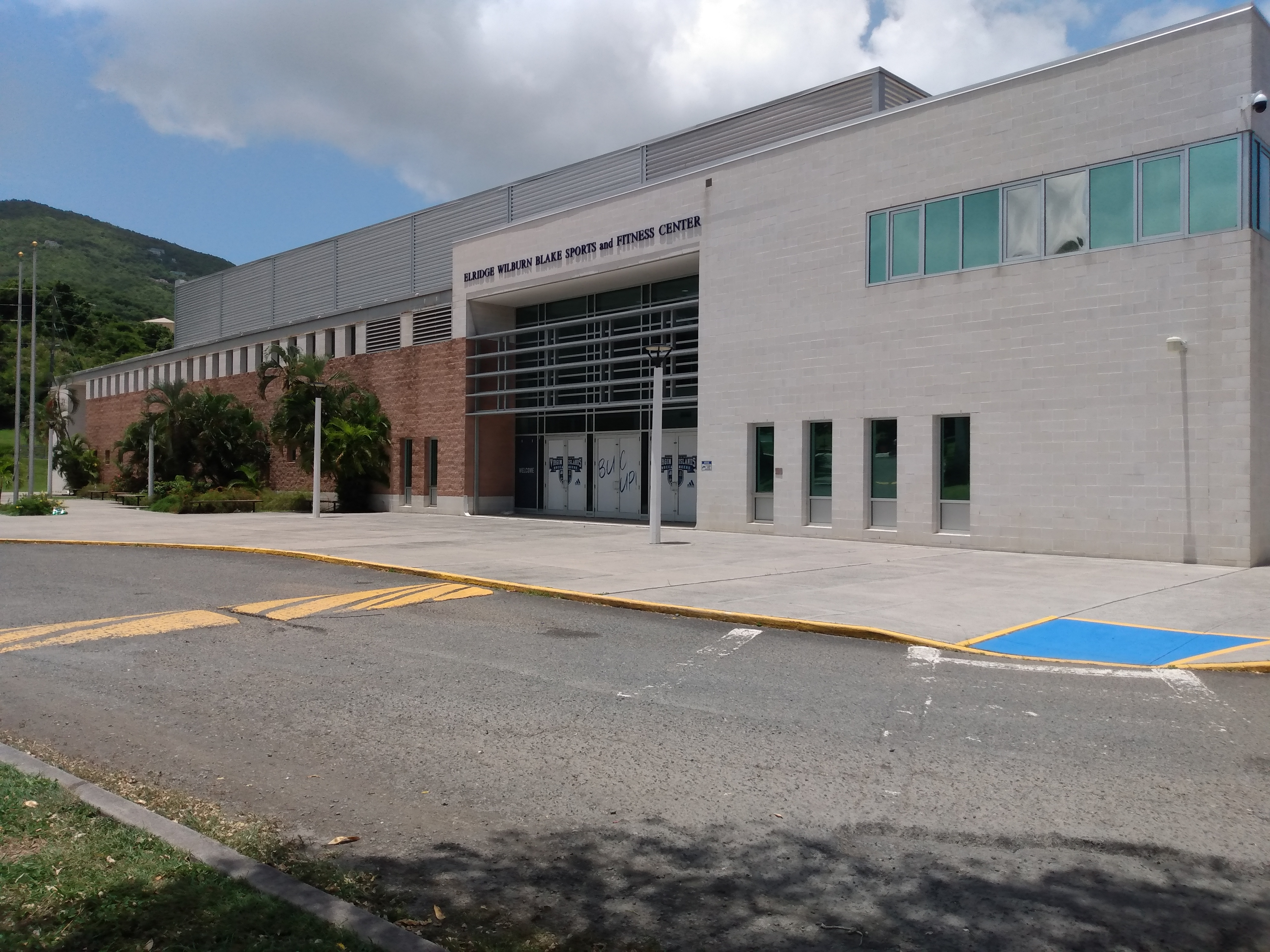
Eldridge Wilburn Blake Sports and Fitness Center

UVI competes in six intercollegiate varsity sports and co-ed sports include eSports.

Collegiate Sports Teams
Club	Affiliation	Conference	Sports	Venues
University of the Virgin Islands; Buccaneers and Lady Buccaneers	NAIA	HBCUAC	Basketball; Track and Field; Cross Country	Elridge Wilburn Blake Sports and Fitness Center; N/A; N/A

Former sports included soccer, tennis, volleyball, cross country, swimming and table tennis.

The U.S. Virgin Islands Paradise Jam is an NCAA Div-I college basketball tournaments that takes place annually in late November. The men's tournament typically takes place the week before Thanksgiving, with the women's tournament occurring during Thanksgiving week. It is held at the Elridge Wilburn Blake Sports and Fitness Center on the campus of the University of the Virgin Islands in Charlotte Amalie, Saint Thomas, U. S. Virgin Islands.

== Transportation ==
=== Airports ===
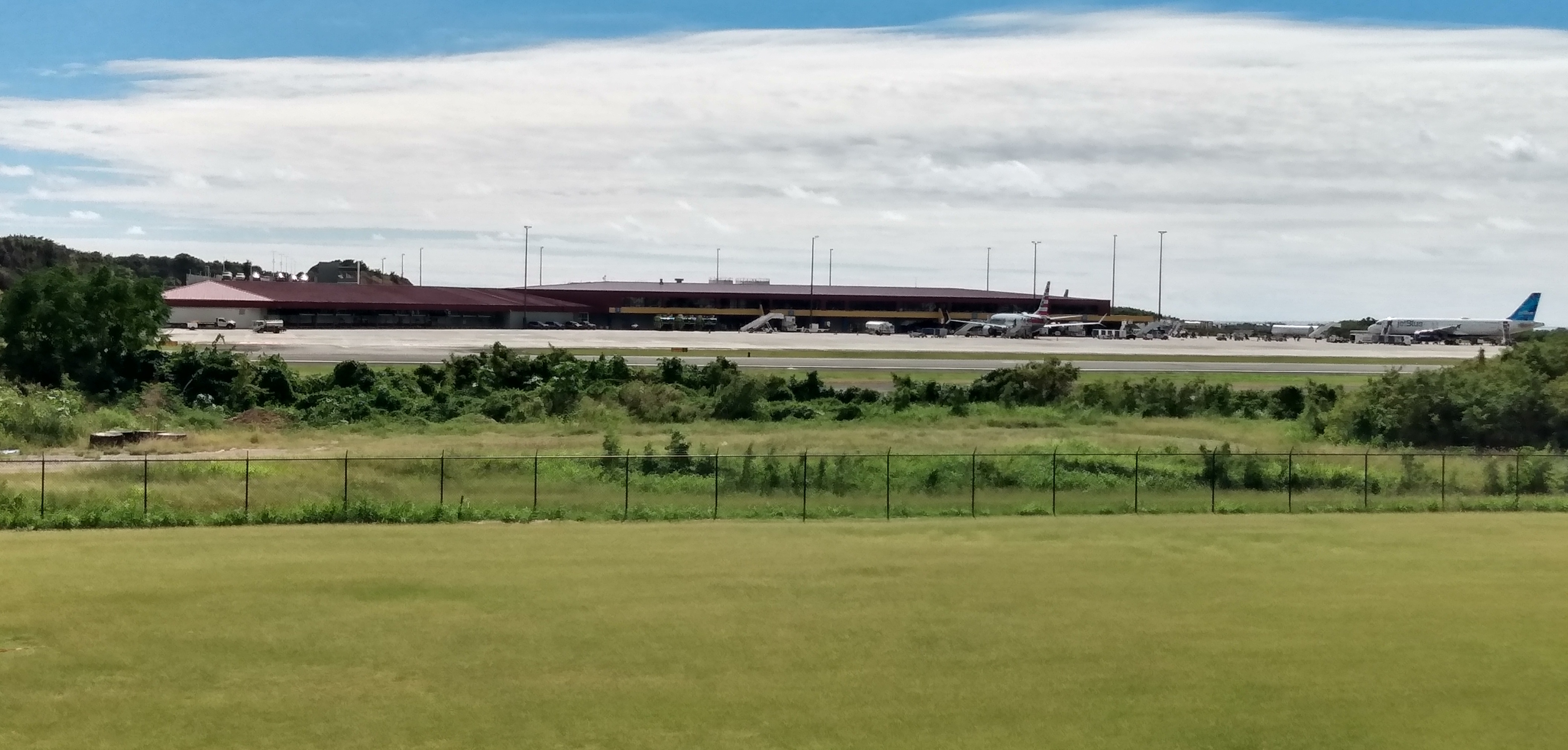
Cyril E King Airport terminal as seen from the UVI campus

Cyril E. King Airport (IATA: STT ICAO: TIST) is the busiest airport in the Virgin Islands archipelago. It offers regular nonstop service to more than 25 destinations in the Virgin Islands archipelago, the Caribbean and the United States.

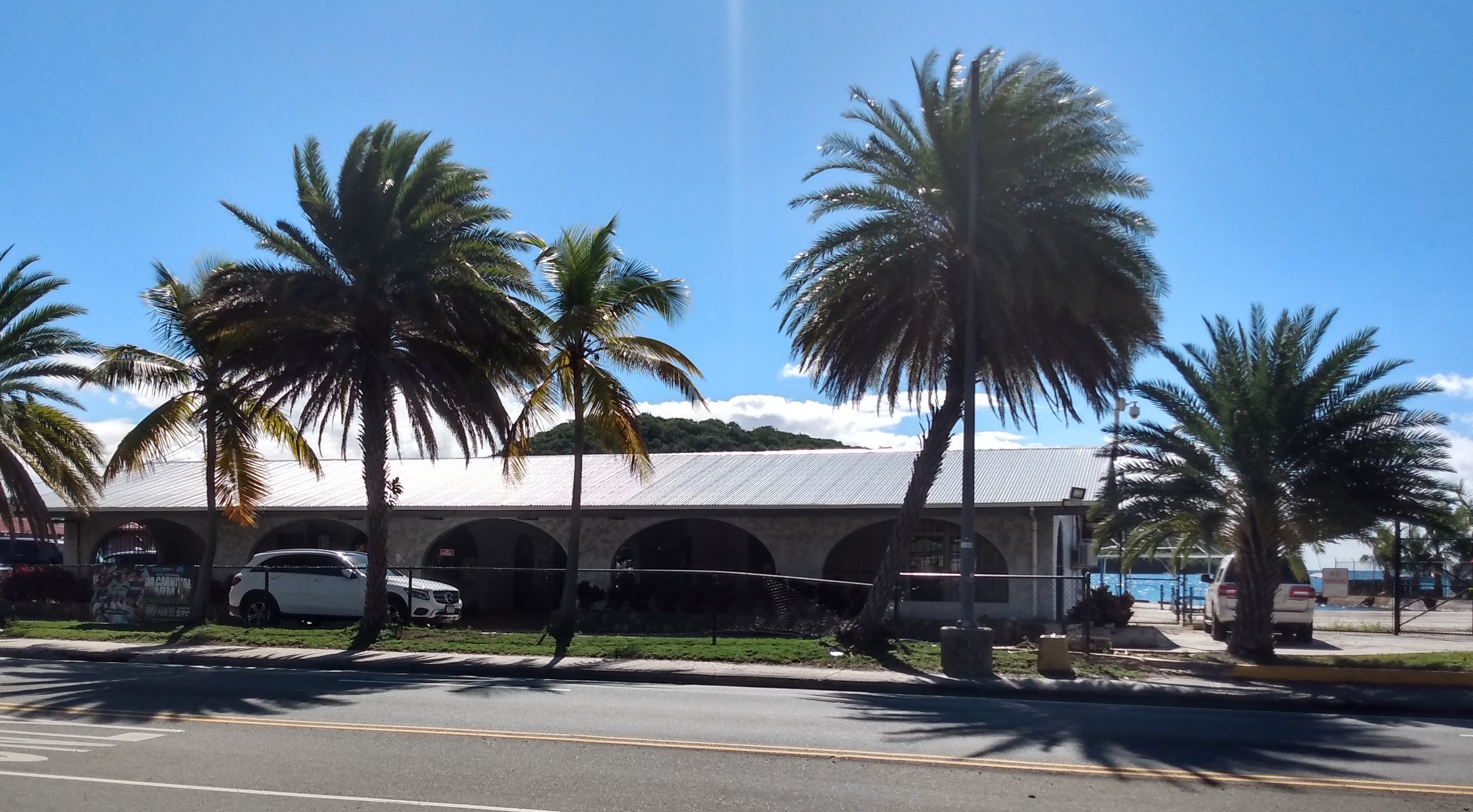
The Charlotte Amalie Harbor Seaplane Base Terminal

Another air transport facility located in the subdistrict of Charlotte Amalie is the Charlotte Amalie Harbor Seaplane Base (IATA: SPB, FAA LID: VI22), also known as St. Thomas Seaplane Base. It is located just east of Frenchtown on Veterans Drive/Waterfront Highway (VI-30). This private-use airport is owned by the Virgin Islands Port Authority. At this base, a seaplane shuttle service is operated between Christiansted, St. Croix and Charlotte Amalie, St. Thomas.

=== Ferry Terminals and Docks ===
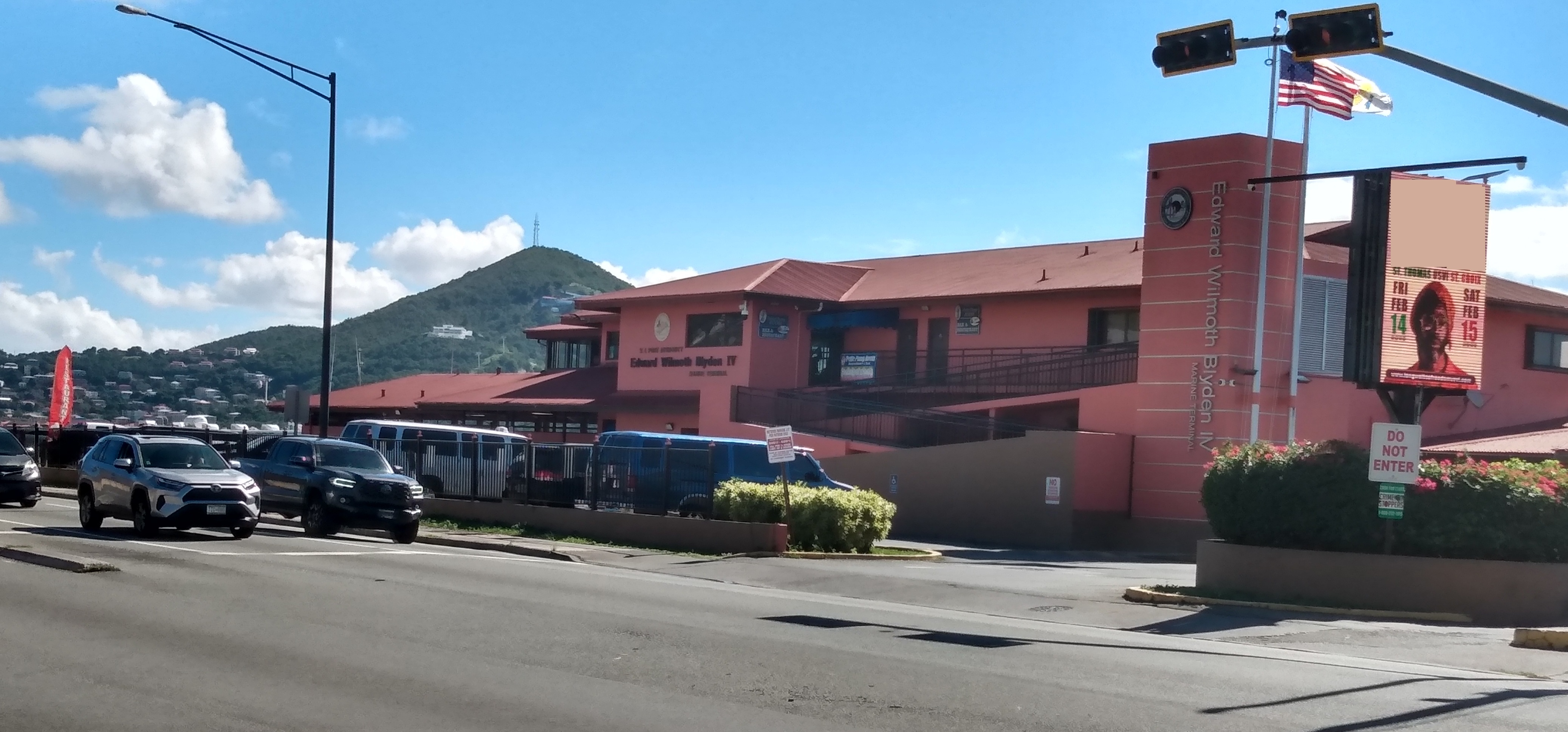
Edward Wilmoth Blyden Marine Terminal

The Edward William Blyden Ferry Terminal serves as the western most official marine port of entry to the U.S. Virgin Islands. To accommodate the entry of foreign travelers entering into US Virgin Islands, the terminal has U S Customs and Border Patrol Offices and officers stationed at the terminal. From the terminal nonstop service to Christiansted, U.S. Virgin Islands, Tortola in the British Virgin Islands, and seasonally to St. John.

For marine access to the other inhabited U.S. Virgin Islands, Crown Bay Marina serves as a key transportation hub, hosting docks for passenger ferries bound for both St. John and Water Island. In addition to regular ferry services, the marina also accommodates private vessels, charter boats, and water taxis, making it an essential gateway for inter-island connectivity within the territory.

=== Public Transit ===
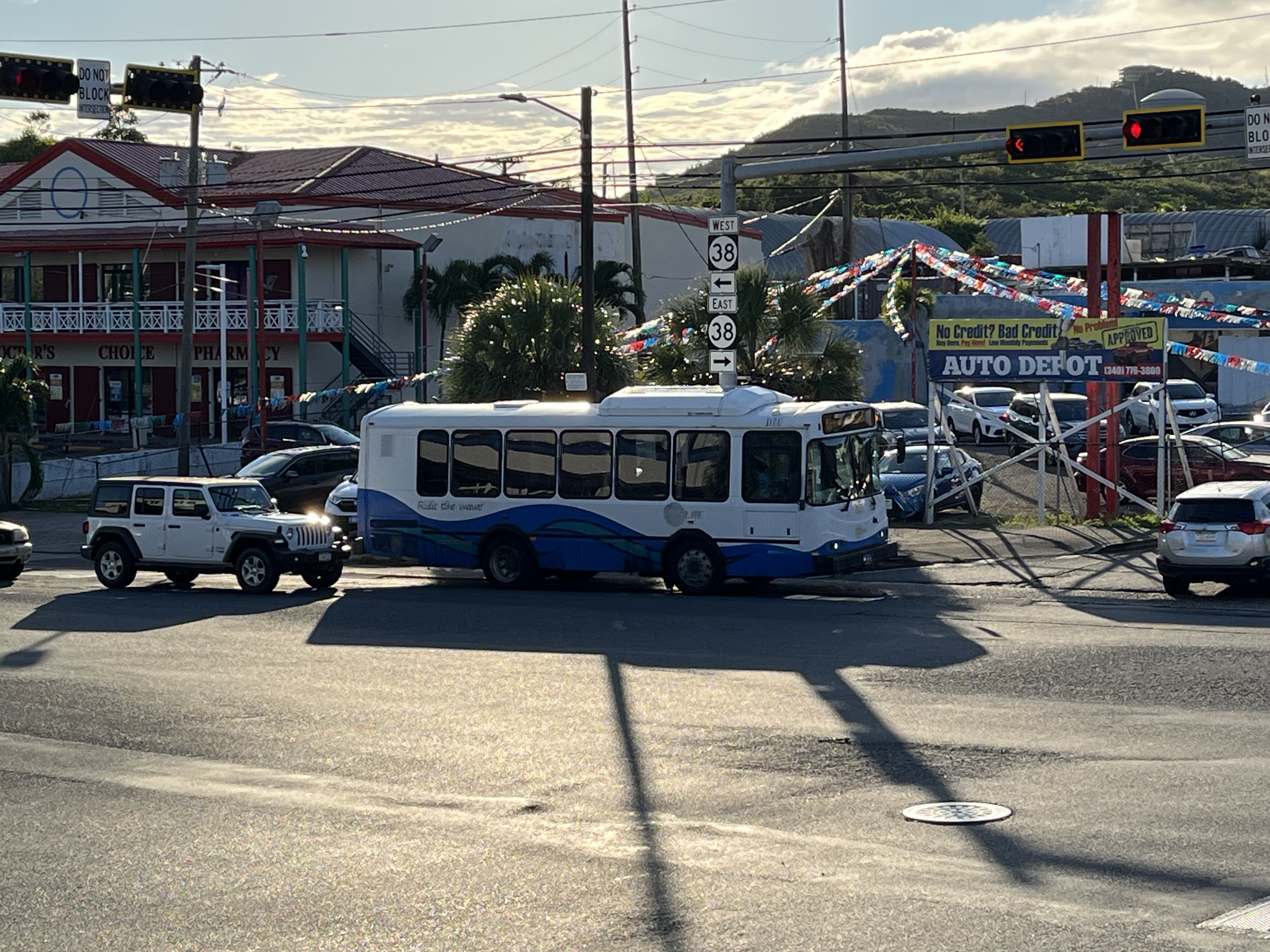
VITRAN bus on St Thomas.

Virgin Islands Transit (VITRAN), the Virgin Islands multi-modal transit system, provides fixed-path bus, paratransit bus, and ferry public transportation throughout the Virgin Islands. Only fixed-path bus and paratransit bus services are available in the subdistrict. Both however, connect to the ferry service portion in Red Hook making it possible for riders on St. John to access the subdistrict. All fixed-path buses on the island of St. Thomas service the subdistrict. The VITRAN bus depot on St. Thomas is located on Harwood Highway (VI-308) in the westside of the subdistrict.

=== Highways and Routes ===
In the USVI, highways and major routes beginning with 3-4 are located on St. Thomas. Many of these highways and routes pass through the subdistrict of Charlotte Amalie. Charlotte Amalie is notable for being the only U.S. capital city (either of a territory or state) where traffic drives on the left side of the road. Some of the major highways and roads through the subdistrict include:

- Highway 30 (VI 30) passes through Charlotte Amalie as Waterfront Highway/Veteran's Drive.
- Route/Highway 33 (VI 33) connects to Highway 30 as Crown Mountain Road.
- Route 35 (VI 35) enters Charlotte Amalie as Maude Proudfoot Drive (Mafolie Rd.) and ends at Highway 30 as Hospital Gade.
- Route 38 (VI 38) Alton Adams Sr. Drive and becomes Dronningens Gade East (not connected to Dronningens Gade).
- Route 40 (VI 40) enters Charlotte Amalie as Theodore Bushelte Dr. and becomes Gamle Nordsidevej in the Charlotte Amalie.
- Route 302 (VI 302) connects to Highway 30 as Airport Road providing access to the Cyril E King Airport Main terminal.
- Route 303 (VI 303) connects to Highway 30 as the Contant Thruway.
- Route 304 (VI 304) connects to Highway 30 and Route 302. It passes through the Crown Bay area the Athniel C. "Addie" Ottley Drive and Sara Hill Road.
- Route 305 (VI 305) connects to Route 304 at both ends and provides access to the Crown Bay Cruise Port as Crown Bay Center Road.
- Route/Highway 308 (VI 308) start in Charlotte Amalie at Route 314 as Norre Gade and becomes Harwood Highway at the west end of Charlotte Amalie.
- Route 313 (VI 313) Rumer Drive connecting Highway 30 to Route 38.
- Route 314 (VI 314) Connects Route 38 on the west side of Bluebeard's Hill to Route 38 on the east side of Bluebeard's Hill.
- Route 316 (VI 316) First Avenue
- Route 332 (VI 332) is a spur route of Highway 33. The road provides a link from Route 33 to Route 40, connecting two major north–south roads out of Charlotte Amalie in the mountains. Route 332 is Scott Free Road and Lower Solberg Road in the mountains.
