= Pirate Radio (disambiguation) =

Pirate radio is illegal or unregulated radio transmission.

Pirate Radio may also refer to:

- Pirate Radio, a 2004 album by Mars Ill
- "Pirate Radio", a 2005 episode of Danny Phantom
- Pirate Radio (box set), a 2006 compilation album by The Pretenders
- The Boat That Rocked, 2009 film retitled Pirate Radio in North America
- "Pirate Radio", a 2026 song by Genesis Owusu from the album Redstar Wu & the Worldwide Scourge
- "Pirate Radio", a song by Jean Dawson from the 2022 album Chaos Now

== Radio stations ==
The "Pirate Radio" name has also been used as branding for several officially licensed radio stations since the early 1980s, such as:

=== Current ===
- KBOX (104.1 FM), licensed to Lompoc, California, known as "Pirate Radio" since 2005
- WDLX (930 AM) / WGHB (1250 AM), licensed to Washington and Farmville, North Carolina, known as "Pirate Radio" since 2003
- WIVI (102.1 FM), licensed to Cruz Bay, U.S. Virgin Islands, known as "Pirate Radio" since 2011
- WKYZ (101.7 FM), licensed to Key West, Florida, known as "Pirate Radio" since 2011
- WOBR-FM (95.3 FM), licensed to Wanchese, North Carolina, known as "Pirate Radio" since 2023
- WSOU (89.5 FM) licensed to Seton Hall University, known as "Pirate Radio" after the school's athletic teams

=== Former ===
- KQLZ (100.3 FM), licensed to Los Angeles, California, used the name from 1989 to 1993, now KKLQ
- KQXR (100.3 FM), licensed to Payette, Idaho, used the name from 1993 to 1995
- KREV (92.7 FM), licensed to Alameda, California, used the name from 2022 to 2023, now KEXC
- KSFE (96.7 FM), licensed to Grants, New Mexico, used the name from 2022 to 2023
- WPPT (94.5 FM), licensed to Panama City, Florida, used the name from 1999 to 2002, now WFLF-FM
- WTBB (97.7 FM), licensed to Bonifay, Florida, used the name from 1992 to 1997, now WBOE
- WIVI (96.1 FM), licensed to Charlotte Amalie, U.S. Virgin Islands, used the name until 2011, now WWKS

== See also ==
- Pirate Radio Four, a 1980s BBC Radio 4 program
- Pirate Radio USA, a 2005 documentary film
- Pirate FM, a British broadcaster covering Cornwall and west Devon
