= WIVI =

Classic rock radio station in Cruz Bay, U.S. Virgin Islands

- Cruz Bay, U.S. Virgin Islands; United States
- Frequency: 102.1 MHz
- Branding: Pirate Radio

Programming
- Format: Classic rock

Ownership
- Owner: News of St. John; (STJ Media, LLC)

History
- First air date: August 24, 1988
- Former call signs: WDCM (1988–1996); WWKS (1996–2017)
- Former frequencies: 96.1 MHz (1988–2017)
- Call sign meaning: Virgin Islands

Technical information
- Licensing authority: FCC
- Facility ID: 31084
- Class: B
- ERP: 50,000 watts
- HAAT: 374 meters (1,227 ft)
- Transmitter coordinates: 18°20′30″N 64°43′59″W

Links
- Public license information: Public file; LMS
- Website: newsofstjohn.com

WIVI (102.1 FM, "Pirate Radio") is a radio station licensed to serve Cruz Bay, U.S. Virgin Islands. The station is licensed to STJ Media, LLC. It airs a classic rock format.

Lonely Planet's 2001 guide to the Virgin Islands described this station as, "probably the most popular rock & roll station" in the USVI.

The station had branded itself as "Pirate Radio" before a flip to the "Hitz 96" moniker on October 1, 2009 and again reverting to the "Pirate Radio" moniker in 2015.

The station swapped call signs and formats with sister station WIVI on July 1, 2017.

== Awards ==
WWKS was chosen as ABC Radio Network's international affiliate of the year for 1999. ABC Radio representatives the station's "commitment to professional broadcasting" and cited "flawless coordination" of two live remote broadcasts of The Tom Joyner Morning Show that originated from the Virgin Islands.

== Ownership ==
GARK LLC, originally a partnership between Gordon Ackley and Randolph Knight, was acquired solely by Gordon Ackley in April 2006 when Ackley bought out Knight's 50% interest for an undisclosed sum. GARK LLC is the licensee of WIVI as well as sister stations WVJZ and WVWI. Local press coverage pegged the sale price "in the neighborhood of $4.3 million" for the three-station combo.
