= Charlotte Amalie East, U.S. Virgin Islands =

Charlotte Amalie East
- Census-Designated Place
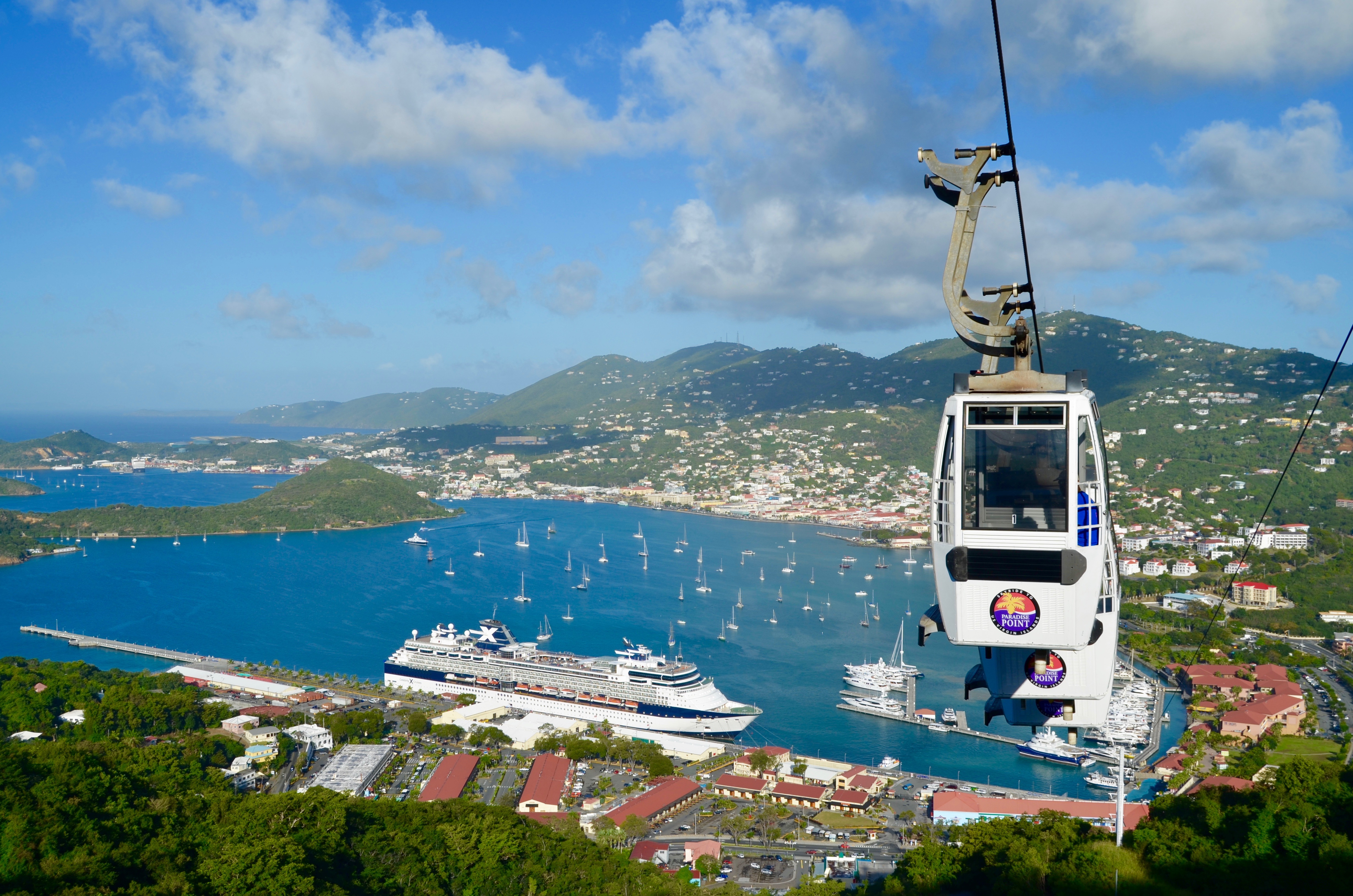

- Location within the United States Virgin Islands
- Coordinates: 18.3383°N 64.9067°W
- Country: United States
- Territory: U.S. Virgin Islands
- Administrative District: Saint Thomas-Saint John
- Island (Census District): Saint Thomas
- Subdistrict(s): Charlotte Amalie, Southside
- Elevation: 203 ft (62 m)

Population (2020)
  - Total: 1,908
- ZIP code: 00801, 00802
- Area code: 340
- GNIS feature ID: 2414007

Charlotte Amalie East is a census-designated place (CDP) in St. Thomas, U.S. Virgin Islands, on the east side of the island. It is the fifth largest town or census-designated place (CDP) in the U.S. Virgin Islands (after Charlotte Amalie, Anna's Retreat, Charlotte Amalie West, and Cruz Bay). Together with the town of Charlotte Amalie and the census-designated place (CDP) Charlotte Amalie West, Charlotte Amalie East make up the subdistrict and "the City" of Charlotte Amalie

St. Thomas, Subdistricts, towns, and CDPs

Charlotte Amalie East is a transportation and shopping area of the island of St. Thomas. Within Charlotte Amalie East is Havensight. Havensight is a community and the busiest cruise port in the world.

The largest shopping facility in Havensight is the Havensight Mall. Havensight Mall was the first shopping center in the U.S. Virgin Islands, and is home to 60 shops. The mall is an outdoor mall featuring numerous tenants and services, including medical, business services, gifts and souvenirs, jewelry, restaurants, apparel, sports, and car rental.

== History ==
Prior to 1912, the area that is the CDP of Charlotte Amalie East was predominantly farm land and estates. That slowly started to change around 1912. The natural geography of Havensight area of Charlotte Amalie East, where the WICO dock is located, provided deeper waters closer to shore than downtown Charlotte Amalie. This made it ideal for accommodating the larger steamships of the 20th century, which needed more draft clearance than the shallow harbor front along the town of Charlotte Amalie's historic waterfront.

Danish Era (1912–1917):

In 1912, Danish shipping magnate Hans Niels Andersen founded The West Indian Company Limited in Copenhagen, Denmark as a subsidiary of the East Asiatic Company. Recognizing the strategic advantage of St. Thomas's deep natural harbor, Andersen established the West Indian Company (WICO) to manage coal bunkering as well as handle the shipping of goods to support maritime commerce in larger quantities, especially the export of sugar, molasses, and rum between the Danish West Indies and Denmark. In the early 20th century, WICO established a dock in the area to accommodate the growing number of steamships and facilitate trade. The company built the original dock and warehouse facilities in what is now an area in Charlotte Amalie East something that would have been tougher to do in the town of Charlotte Amalie given the limited space due to the dense urban development.

When rumors of a finalization of the potential sale of the Danish West Indies to the United States of America became apparent, it is said that Andersen leveraged his personal relationship with Denmark's royal family to influence the Danish government's decision to include WICO and its holdings as one of the concessions in the transfer treaty.

Transition to U.S. Control Through WWII (1917-1940s):

After the U.S. purchased the Virgin Islands from Denmark in 1917, WICO remained a privately held Danish company with, continuing its operations in St. Thomas. The WICO dock became a dedicated commercial port away from the older colonial center (Charlotte Amalie) and because of the concessions agreed to, autonomously operated under corporate control. The WICO dock became increasingly important as St. Thomas evolved even more into a major port for transatlantic shipping and trade.

During this same period of time, the area currently known as Mandela Circle in Charlotte Amalie East became the site of Camp Harwood, a U.S. Navy installation. This facility played a role in the military operations and infrastructure development on the island during the early 20th century. The facility was later decommissioned during this period of time.

Shift to Cruise Tourism (1950s-1980s):

With the decline of the sugar industry and the rise of Caribbean tourism, the WICO dock transitioned from handling cargo ships to accommodating cruise ships. By the 1950s, St. Thomas became a popular stop for cruise liners, and WICO expanded its facilities to handle larger vessels and increased passenger traffic. WICO was the only cruise port on St. Thomas during this period of time and it was not controlled by the local or federal governments.

During this period, other retail and activity facilities catering to cruise ship passengers, not wanting to venture too far from the WICO dock, were developed around the cruise port. This included development of the tram way facility. Also during this period of time, many of the farm lands in the area transitioned to a residential area and shopping facilities for residents.

Government Acquisition of WICO (1993):

In 1993, the Government of the U.S. Virgin Islands purchased the West Indian Company Ltd., including the WICO dock and its associated properties. This allowed the Virgin Islands government to directly control the cruise ship economy, manage docking fees, and further develop the Havensight Mall, located adjacent to the dock.

== Demographics ==
=== 2020 Census ===
Charlotte Amalie East CDP, U.S. Virgin Islands – Racial and ethnic composition Note: the US Census treats Hispanic/Latino as an ethnic category. This table excludes Latinos from the racial categories and assigns them to a separate category. Hispanics/Latinos may be of any race.
Race / Ethnicity (NH = Non-Hispanic)	Pop 2020	% 2020
White alone (NH)	10	0.52%
Black or African American alone (NH)	1,568	82.18%
Native American or Alaska Native alone (NH)	2	0.10%
Asian alone (NH)	5	0.26%
Native Hawaiian or Pacific Islander alone (NH)	0	0.00%
Other race alone (NH)	0	0.00%
Mixed race or Multiracial (NH)	42	2.20%
Hispanic or Latino (any race)	282	14.78%
Total	1,909	100.00%

== Art and Culture ==
=== Museums ===
A list of Museums and Art Galleries in the CDP of Charlotte Amalie East:

- Pirates Treasure Museum
- The Virgin Islands Children's Museum

== Transportation ==
Bird's eye view of Havensight from the Paradise Point Tramway

Charlotte Amalie East also holds one of the two cruise ports in St. Thomas, the West Indian Company (WICO) dock. The other cruise ship port is Crown Bay in Charlotte Amalie West. The WICO dock has space for 3 large cruise ships as well as the on port shopping center of Havensight Mall.

=== Highways and Major Roads ===
In the USVI, highways and major routes beginning with 3-4 are located on St. Thomas. A few of these highways and routes pass through or border the CDP of Charlotte Amalie East. Some of the major highways and roads include:

- Highway 30 (VI 30) passes through Charlotte Amalie East Elmo D. Roebuck Senior Drive.
- Route 38 (VI 38) Weymouth Rhymer Highway.
- Route 313 (VI 313) Rumer Drive connecting Highway 30 to Route 38.

== Climate ==
Climate data for Charlotte Amalie East
Month	Jan	Feb	Mar	Apr	May	Jun	Jul	Aug	Sep	Oct	Nov	Dec	Year
Mean daily maximum °F (°C)	86 (30)	86 (30)	86 (30)	88 (31)	88 (31)	90 (32)	90 (32)	91 (33)	90 (32)	90 (32)	88 (31)	86 (30)	88 (31)
Mean daily minimum °F (°C)	72 (22)	72 (22)	72 (22)	74 (23)	76 (24)	77 (25)	78 (26)	78 (26)	77 (25)	76 (24)	75 (24)	73 (23)	75 (24)
Average precipitation inches (mm)	1.89 (48)	1.51 (38)	1.52 (39)	2.39 (61)	3.36 (85)	2.35 (60)	2.42 (61)	3.50 (89)	5.34 (136)	5.57 (141)	5.28 (134)	2.74 (70)	37.87 (962)
