= Havensight, U.S. Virgin Islands =

Coordinates: 18°19′48″N 64°55′18″W

Bird's eye view of Havensight from the Paradise Point Tramway.

Havensight on Saint Thomas in the U.S. Virgin Islands is a community and the busiest cruise port in the world.

It is located predominantly subdistrict of Charlotte Amalie with a small portion in the Southside census subdistrict (CSD), 1.5 miles from territorial historical capital of Charlotte Amalie's downtown in Charlotte Amalie East. Havensight is mostly known for its deepwater port West Indian Company (WICO) Dock, but is also known for its aerial tramway to Paradise Point on Flag Hill, the Havensight Mall, and many available ocean- and boat trips. The community is home a variety of companies offering boat trips, submarine rides, scuba diving, jet skiing, snorkeling, and more. There are also boat trips available to Red Hook in East End, Saint John, and Water Island.

Havensight Mall was the first shopping center in the U.S. Virgin Islands, and is home to 60 shops. Additional shops and restaurants can be found along Elmo D. Roebuck Senior Drive (Route 30). Yacht Haven Grande is an additional shopping mall, lying between Havensight and downtown Charlotte Amalie. This mall offers a number of upscale shops and boutiques, including Louis Vuitton, Gucci, and others.
