= Kimelman Cancer Institute =

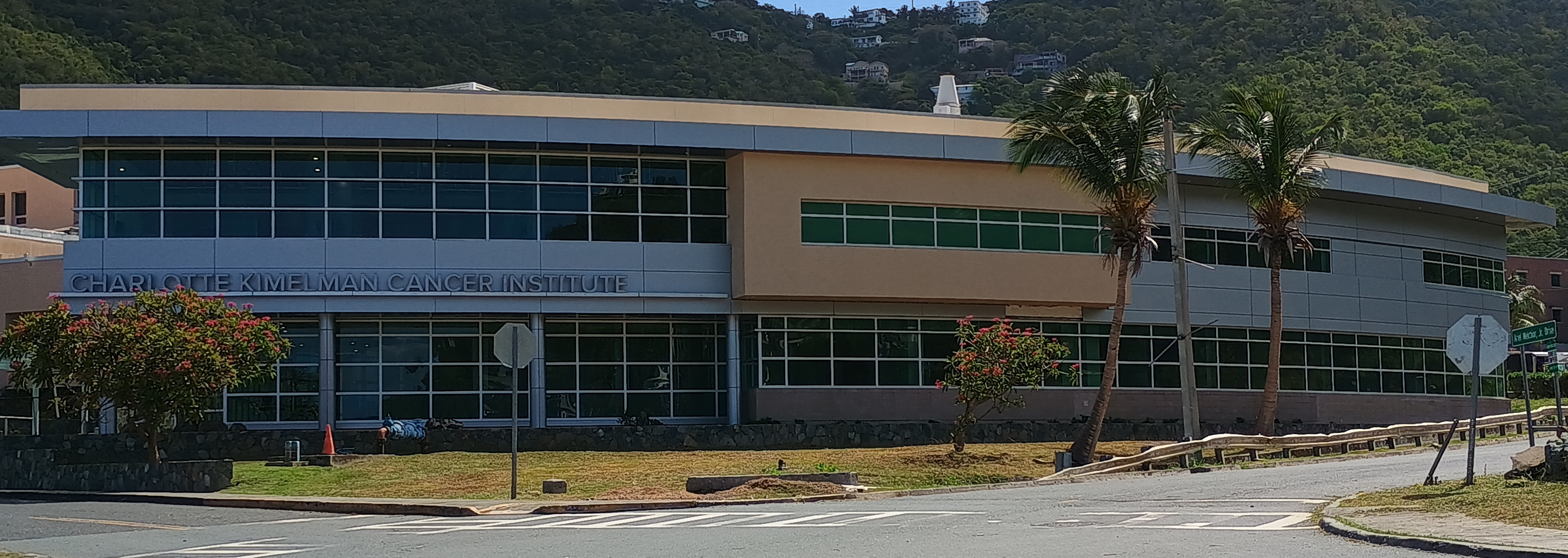
Charlotte Kimelman Cancer Institute (CKCI)

The Kimelman Cancer Institute is a facility specializing in the treatment and study of cancer; it is located in Saint Thomas, U.S. Virgin Islands. It is part of the Schneider Regional Center's (SRC) three-pronged cancer program that includes the Charlotte Kimelman Cancer Institute (CKCI), The Roy Lester Schneider Hospital (RLSH) and the Myrah Keating Smith Community Health (MKSCH) Center., and was founded by Charlotte Kimelman and her late husband, former US Ambassador, Henry L. Kimelman.

SRC's collaborative, comprehensive cancer program is a centralized facility staffed with physicians, specialists, hospital and other support care professionals.

== Size ==
CKCI's 165-bed facility is a, “24,000 square foot state-of-the-art, comprehensive cancer center,” located in St. Thomas, USVI. Providing a variety of healing services from radiation oncology, surgical consultations, clinical research and support housed in a single facility, CKCI's mission is to provide access to, “highly supportive, individualized and holistic care,” to cancer patients throughout the Caribbean. Operating under the direction of medical and administrative leadership, CKCI is a financially autonomous entity, working in conjunction with the overall oncology service line of the SRC.

Serving as a referral center for advanced cancer research, agents and technologies, the Charlotte Kimelman Cancer Institute extends its reach from regional physicians, health care professionals, hospitals and medical centers within the Caribbean to the mainland to find innovations in cancer treatment and research.

== History ==
Dr. Bert Petersen, currently the Director of the Breast Surgery Clinic of St. Barnabas Hospital in the Bronx, New York and Adjunct Associate Professor of Surgery at New York University School of Medicine, collaborated with the Kimelmans in the founding of the institute. In 1998, Dr. Petersen, a native of the U.S. Virgin Islands and a well known breast cancer surgeon, worked closely with the government of the Virgin Islands and other entities to encourage support of and investment in the cancer center. By 2003, the Charlotte Kimelman Cancer Institute honored Dr. Petersen with the designation of "Physician Champion" for his work as a contributing founder, co-project manager, and clinical medical adviser from 1998 to 2005.
