= Pirate Radio USA =

- Pirate Radio USA cover art
- Directed by: Jeff Pearson
- Written by: Jeff Pearson
- Produced by: Mary Jones
- Narrated by: Jeff Pearson
- Cinematography: Mary Jones; Jeff Pearson
- Edited by: Dex Manley
- Production company: Deface the Nation Films
- Distributed by: B-side Entertainment
- Release dates: March 22, 2006 (Bermuda); July 31, 2006 (United States)
- Running time: 84 minutes
- Country: United States
- Language: English

Pirate Radio USA is a 2006 documentary film written and directed by Jeff Pearson, with musical director Mary Jones. Its running time is 82 minutes.

== Summary ==
The film showcases illegal radio, or pirate radio in America. DJs Him and Her (Pearson and Jones respectively) travel throughout the country meeting and interviewing radio pirates, taking action against the FCC and the World Trade Organization's 1999 Seattle conference.

== Cast ==
- Jeff Pearson, DJ Him
- Mary Jones, DJ Her
- Stephen Dunifer, himself
- Mark Alan, himself
- Oregon Senator Ron Wyden, himself
- Pam Hairston, lawyer, FCC Compliance and Information Bureau
- Petri Dish
- DJ Realtime
- DJ Sara Zia

== Production ==
=== Soundtrack ===
As well as starring in the film, Mary Jones was also the music director. The soundtrack featured songs from Jello Biafra and Utah Phillips.

== Release ==
While using low-budget and basic filming technology, this film was a success internationally, and was shown at the Bermuda International Film Festival, the Victoria Independent Film Video Festival, and the Austin Film Festival. It also won "Most Original Documentary" at the Wine Country Film Festival and "Best Feature-Judges Award" at the Zion Independent Film Festival.
