= WVJZ =

- Charlotte Amalie, U.S. Virgin Islands; United States
- Frequency: 105.3 MHz
- Branding: 105 Jamz

Programming
- Format: Mainstream Urban/reggae, Calypso music

Ownership
- Owner: Victor Webster; (Vic Web Radio, LLC)
- Sister stations: WWKS

History
- First air date: December 23, 1985
- Former call signs: WVGN (1985–1998)
- Call sign meaning: Jamz

Technical information
- Licensing authority: FCC
- Facility ID: 62113
- Class: B
- ERP: 30,200 watts
- HAAT: 483 meters (1,585 ft)
- Transmitter coordinates: 18°21′33″N 64°58′18″W

Links
- Public license information: Public file; LMS
- Website: vicwebradio.com

WVJZ (105.3 FM) is a radio station licensed to serve Charlotte Amalie, U.S. Virgin Islands. The station is licensed to Vic Web Radio, LLC which is wholly owned by Victor Webster. It airs a Mainstream Urban and reggae music format.

Lonely Planet's guide to the Virgin Islands describes this station as "the station for continuous R&B" in the USVI.

The Federal Communications Commission assigned the WVGN call letters to this station on December 23, 1985. It held this call sign until switching to the current WVJZ call letters on June 15, 1998.

== Ownership ==
GARK LLC, originally a partnership between Gordon Ackley and Randolph Knight, was acquired solely by Gordon Ackley in April 2006 when Ackley bought out Knight's 50% interest for an undisclosed sum. GARK LLC is the licensee of WVJZ as well as sister stations WVWI and WIVI. Local press coverage pegged the sale price "in the neighborhood of $4.3 million" for the three-station combo.

== Translator stations ==
Broadcast translator for WVJZ
Call sign	Frequency	City of license	FID	ERP (W)	FCC info
W276CH	103.1 FM	Frederiksted, U.S. Virgin Islands	139997	10	LMS
