= U.S. Virgin Islands Governor's Mansion =

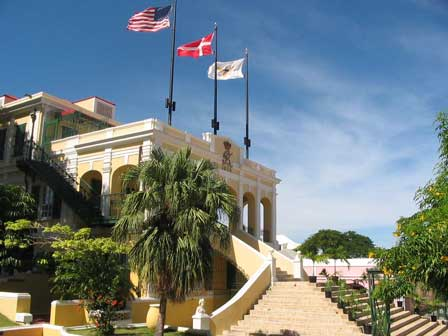
Government House, Saint Croix

U.S. Virgin Islands Governor's Mansion may refer to any one of the three official residences owned by the government of the U.S. Virgin Islands and provided to the Governor of the United States Virgin Islands. One residence is located on each of the three largest inhabited islands of this U.S. territory in the Caribbean. The U.S. Virgin Islands maintains more official gubernatorial residences than any other state or territory of the United States.

== Three Governor's Mansions ==
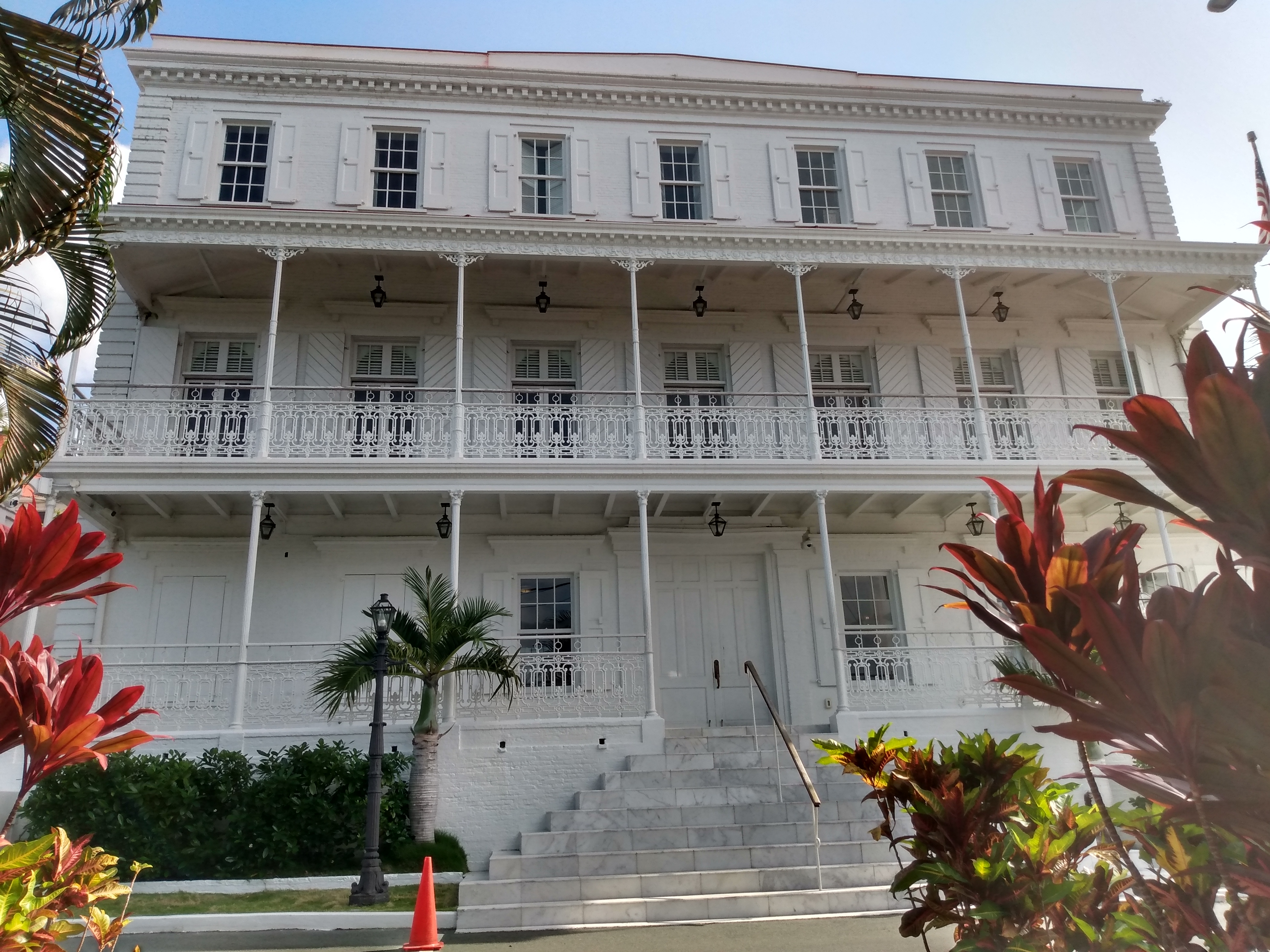
Governor's Mansion in the Government House complex on St. Thomas.

The following properties serve as gubernatorial residences:

- Government House, Saint Thomas; located in the territory's capital city of Charlotte Amalie at 18°20′34.35″N 64°55′45.27″W
- Government House, Saint Croix; located in the island's largest town and chief port, Christiansted, within the Christiansted National Historic Site at 17°44′47.07″N 64°42′12.76″W.
- The Battery, Saint John, designed by Puerto Rican architect Francisco Valinés Cofresí (1878-1949); located in the island's main town of Cruz Bay at 18°19′56.33″N 64°47′42.71″W.

In 2019, incoming governor Albert Bryan announced that he and his wife would use Government House, Saint Croix as their primary family residence and that the other two properties would be used whenever the governor stayed on those islands. This marked the first time in 30 years that a governor's family chose to make their principal home in the Saint Croix residence.

The historic Estate Catherineberg, a former sugar plantation outside Charlotte Amalie on St. Thomas, had previously served as a residence for the Governor on that island while the Governor's working offices remained in Government House, Saint Thomas. Catherineberg is no longer used as a residence, however, and Government House is again the Governor's residence when staying in the territory's capital. In 2017 the government announced that the Catherineberg property would be opened to the public as a museum.

== See also ==
- National Register of Historic Places listings in the United States Virgin Islands
- Government House, British Virgin Islands, residence of the Governor of the British Virgin Islands
