= WVWI =

- Charlotte Amalie, U.S. Virgin Islands; United States
- Frequency: 1000 kHz
- Branding: Radio One AM 1000

Programming
- Format: Talk radio
- Affiliations: Fox News Radio; Fox Sports Radio; Atlanta Braves Radio Network

Ownership
- Owner: Alma Francis Heyliger; (Infinity Broadcasting, LLC)

History
- First air date: October 6, 1962
- Former call signs: WBNB (1962–1970); WVWI (1970–2017); WWKS (2017)
- Call sign meaning: Welcomed Voice of the West Indies

Technical information
- Licensing authority: FCC
- Facility ID: 66976
- Class: B
- Power: 5,000 watts (day); 1,000 watts (night)
- Transmitter coordinates: 18°20′11″N 64°56′41″W

Links
- Public license information: Public file; LMS
- Webcast: Listen live
- Website: radio1000.net

WVWI (1000 AM) is a radio station licensed to serve Charlotte Amalie, U.S. Virgin Islands. The station is licensed to Infinity Broadcasting, LLC which is wholly owned by Alma Francis-Heyliger. It airs a talk radio format.

== Programming ==
In addition to its regular programming, this station airs the "dLife Diabetes Minute" health advisory program and Major League Baseball games as an affiliate of the Atlanta Braves radio network.

== Ownership ==
The station began operations in October 1962 as WBNB (the callsign stood for Bob aNd Bob, as in Bob Noble and Bob Moss, the station's co-founders) co-owned with the now-defunct WBNB-TV, the Virgin Islands' first television station. After founding owners Island Teleradio Service, Inc. sold the TV outlet in 1970, WBNB's call letters were changed to the present WVWI in order to comply with an FCC rule in place then that required TV and radio stations in the same market, but with different ownership to use different call signs. The station's co-founder, Robert Noble, acquired sole control of WVWI that same year, renaming his new company Thousand Islands Corporation. After its facilities were destroyed by Hurricane Marilyn in September 1995, Noble sold the station in 1996 to Randolph Knight, who proceeded to rebuild the station;. its former TV cousin, WBNB-TV was forced off the air when Hurricane Hugo destroyed its transmitter six years earlier in 1989, and unlike WVWI, WBNB-TV's owners, Benedek Broadcasting, did not have the financial means to rebuild the station, and stayed dark as a result.

Local businessman Gordon Ackley purchased WVWI and its FM sister station, WWKS, from Knight in 2006. The two men were partners in another radio station, WVJZ, and Ackley also bought out Knight's 50 percent interest in that outlet. On July 1, 2017, the station changed its callsign to WWKS but on July 6, the station reverted to its prior callsign WVWI.

Effective January 1, 2021, Ackley sold WVWI to Alma Francis Heyliger's Infinity Broadcasting, LLC for $160,000.
