= WWKS =

- Charlotte Amalie, U.S. Virgin Islands; United States
- Frequency: 96.1 MHz
- Branding: Kiss 96.1

Programming
- Format: Urban adult contemporary

Ownership
- Owner: Victor Webster; (Vic Web Radio, LLC)
- Sister stations: WVJZ

History
- First air date: May 17, 1988
- Former call signs: WIVI (1988-2017)
- Call sign meaning: Kiss

Technical information
- Licensing authority: FCC
- Facility ID: 57787
- Class: B1
- ERP: 2,400 watts
- HAAT: 457 meters (1,500 feet)
- Transmitter coordinates: 18°21′33″N 64°58′18″W

Links
- Public license information: Public file; LMS
- Website: www.vicwebradio.com

WWKS (96.1 FM, "Kiss 96") is a radio station licensed to serve Charlotte Amalie, U.S. Virgin Islands. The station is owned by Victor Webster through Vic Web Radio, LLC. It airs an urban adult contemporary music format.

== Ownership ==
In May 2007, WIVI was sold by Rox Radio Enterprises Inc. (Jason Ackley, president, CEO) to Gordon P. Ackley. Rox Radio, 60% owned by Gordon Ackley, assigned WIVI to GARK LLC, which is 100% owned by Ackley, for a reported $300,000.
