= Charlotte Amalie, U.S. Virgin Islands =

Capital city of the United States Virgin Islands

Charlotte Amalie
- Town
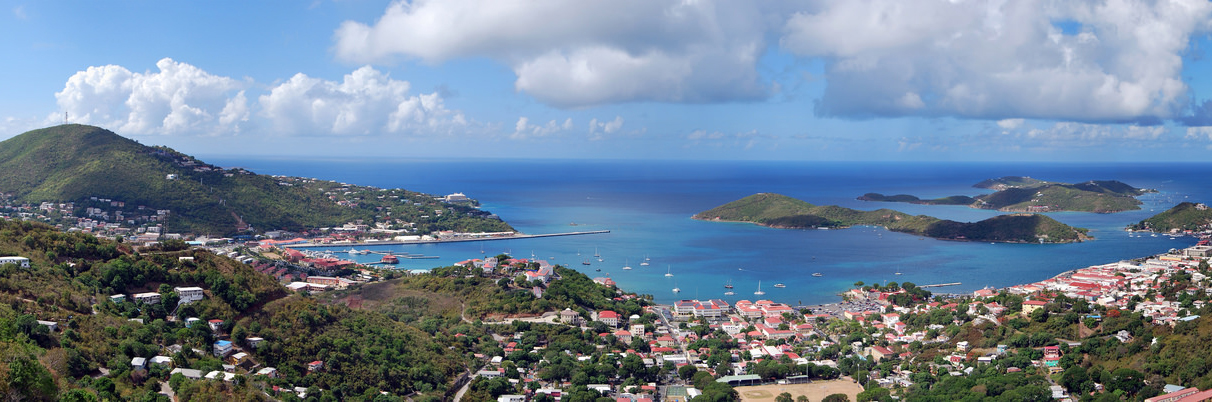
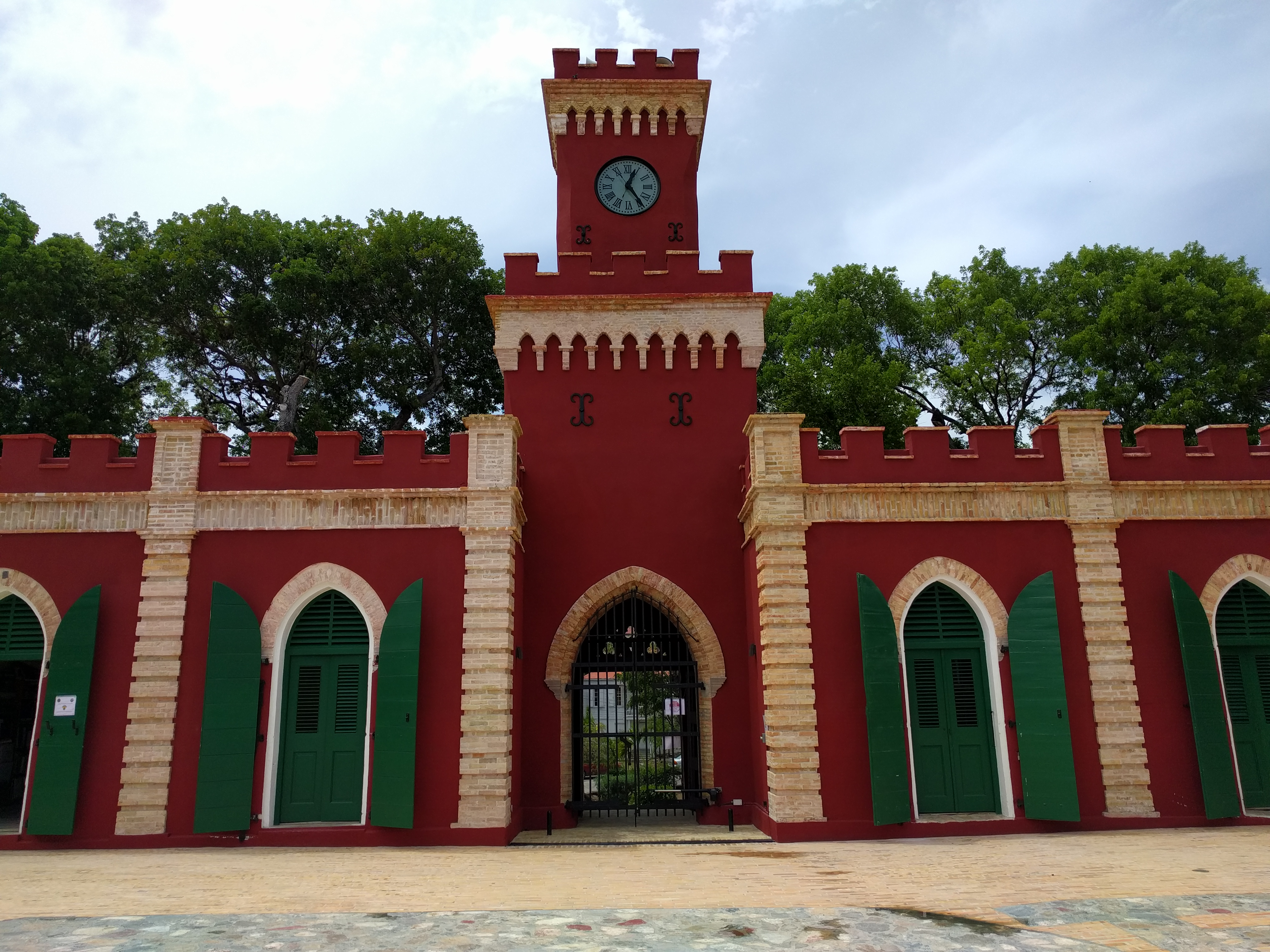
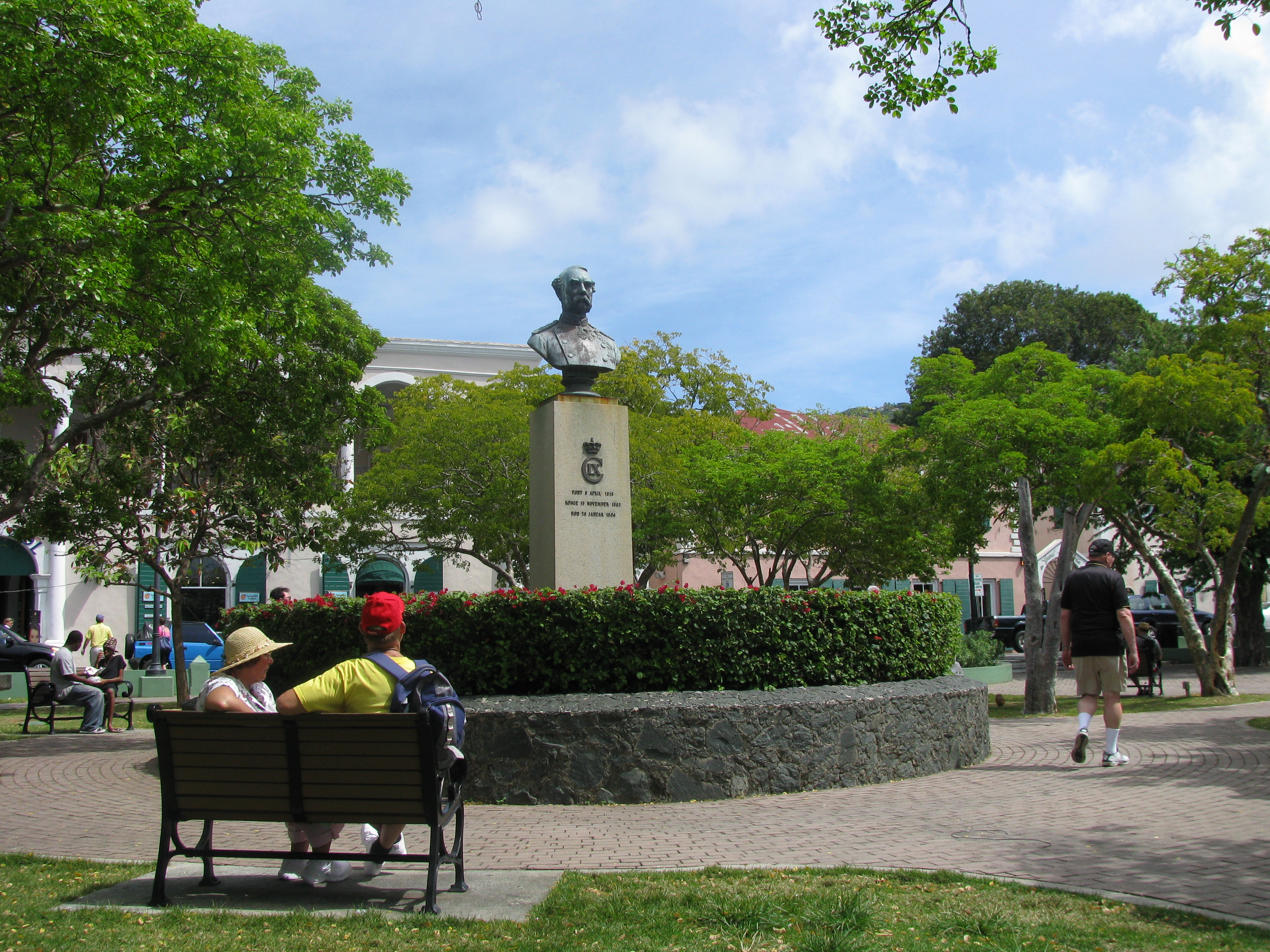
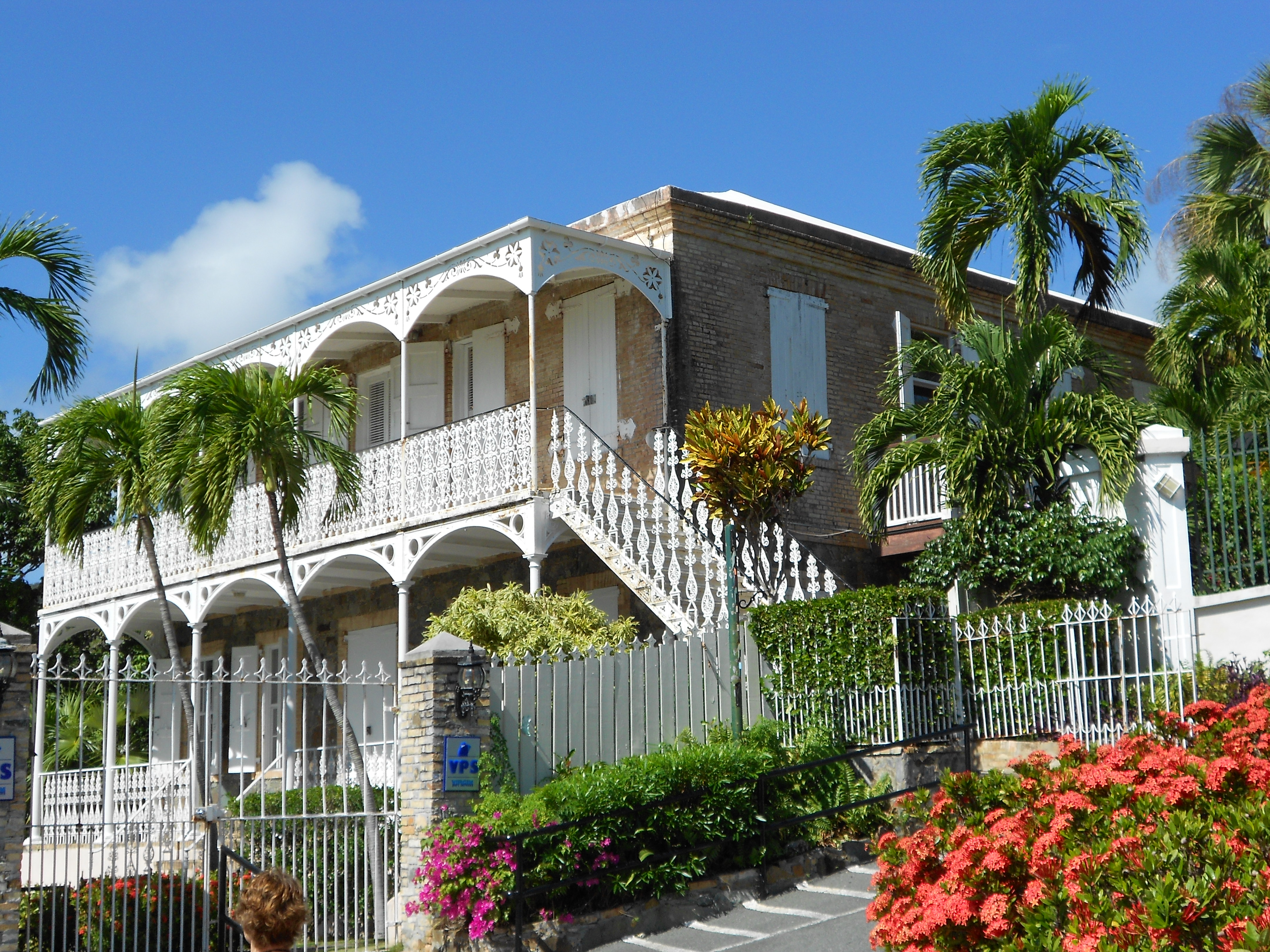
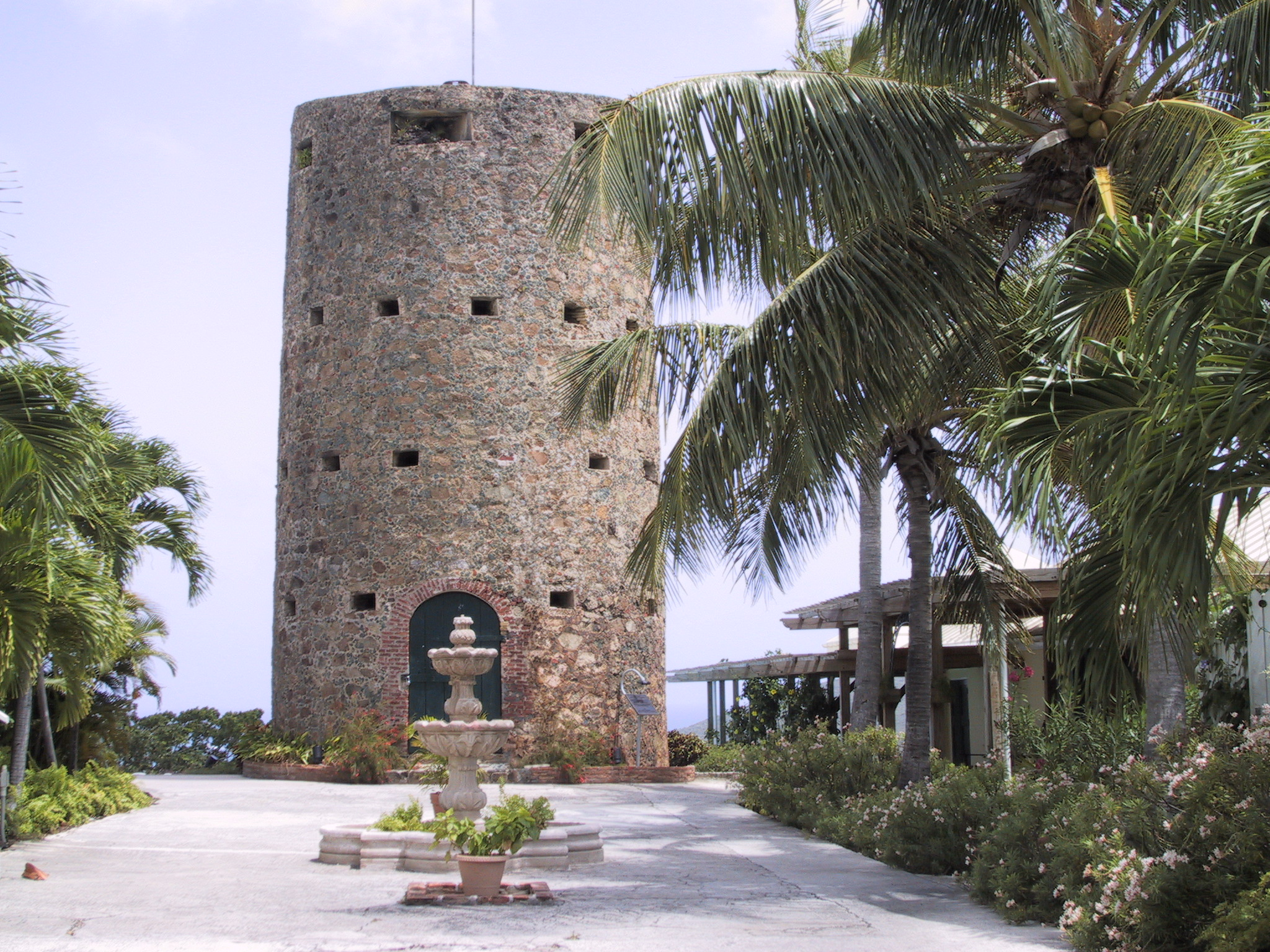
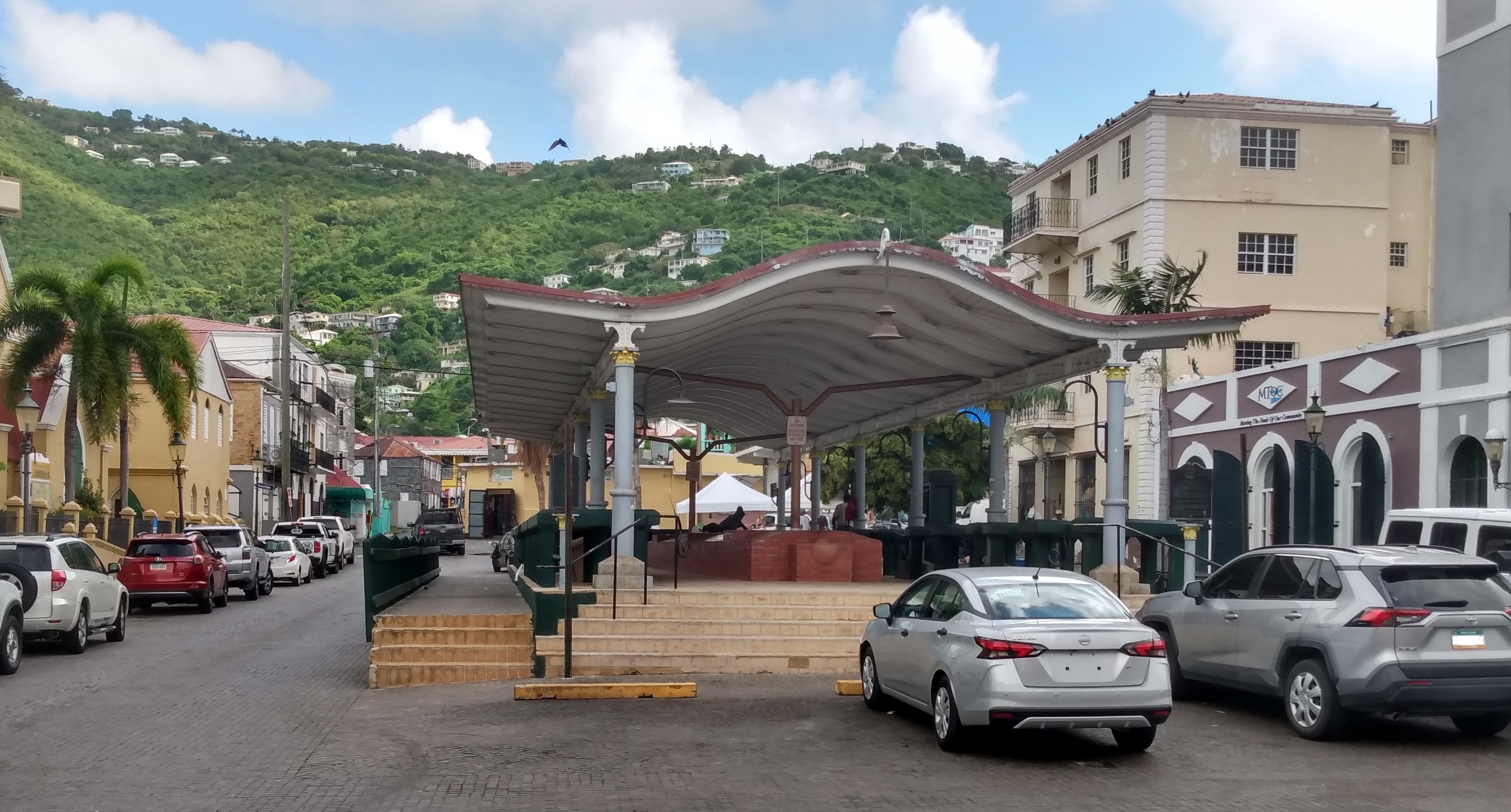
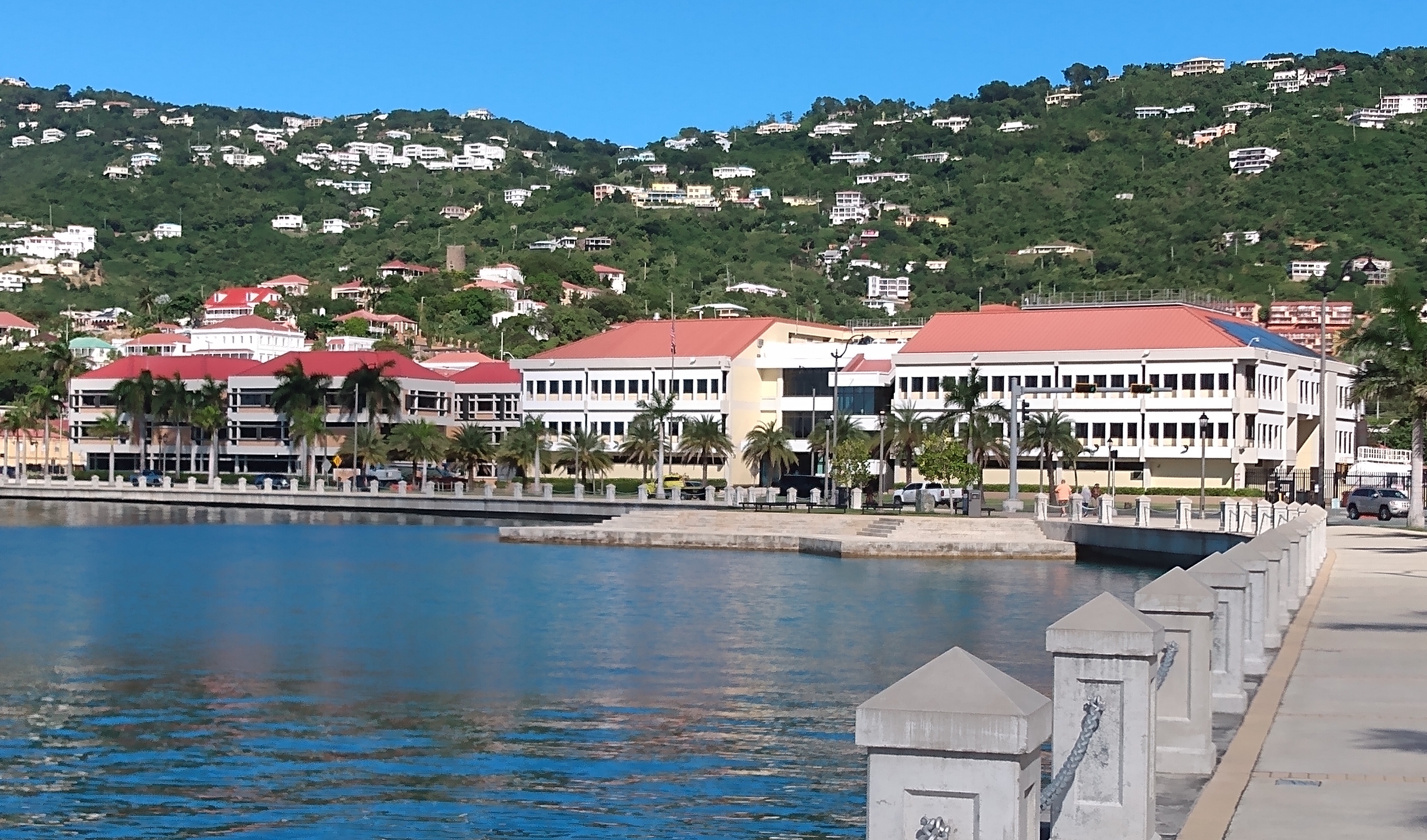
- Top: Lookout View of Charlotte Amalie; Upper Middle: Fort Christian, Emancipation Garden; Lower Middle: Villa Nottman, Blackbeard's Castle; Bottom: Rothschild Francis Square, Waterfront promenade with the VI Alexander A Farrelly Justice Complex and Ron De Lugo US Federal Building in the background.
- Nicknames: Downtown; Town; Charlotte Amalie Town
- Location within the United States Virgin Islands Charlotte Amalie (North America)
- Coordinates: 18°21′N 64°57′W
- Country: United States
- Territory: U.S. Virgin Islands
- Administrative District: Saint Thomas-Saint John
- Island (Census District): Saint Thomas
- Subdistrict(s): Charlotte Amalie
- Named for: Charlotte Amalie of Hesse-Kassel

Government
  - Mayor: None

Area
  - Town: 1.213 sq mi (3.14 km^{2})
  - Urban: 3.36 sq mi (8.7 km^{2})
- Elevation: 23 ft (7.0 m)

Population (2020)
  - Town: 8,194
  - Density: 6,755/sq mi (2,608/km^{2})
  - Urban: 14,477 (subdistrict)
- Time zone: UTC-04:00 (AST)
- ZIP code(s): 00801, 00802, 00803, 00804
- Area code: 340
- FIPS code: 78-16300
- GNIS feature ID: 2414184

Charlotte Amalie (/ˈʃɑːrlət əˈmɑːli(ə)/ SHAR-lət ə-MAH-lee(-ə); Danish: [ʃɑˈlʌtʰə ɑˈmɑːljə]), on Saint Thomas, is the capital and largest town of the U.S. Virgin Islands. It is on the island's southern shore at the head of Charlotte Amalie Harbor. The town is known for its historic sites, Danish colonial architecture, harbor, and shopping. In 2020, it had a population of 8,194, making it the most densely populated town in the U.S. Virgin Islands.

It has a deep-water harbor that was once a haven for pirates (including Blackbeard) and is now one of the busiest ports of call for cruise ships in the Caribbean. About 1.5 million cruise ship passengers land there annually, and hundreds of ferries and yachts pass by each week. Protected by Hassel Island, the harbor has docking and fueling facilities, machine shops, and shipyards and was a U.S. submarine base until 1966.

== Name ==
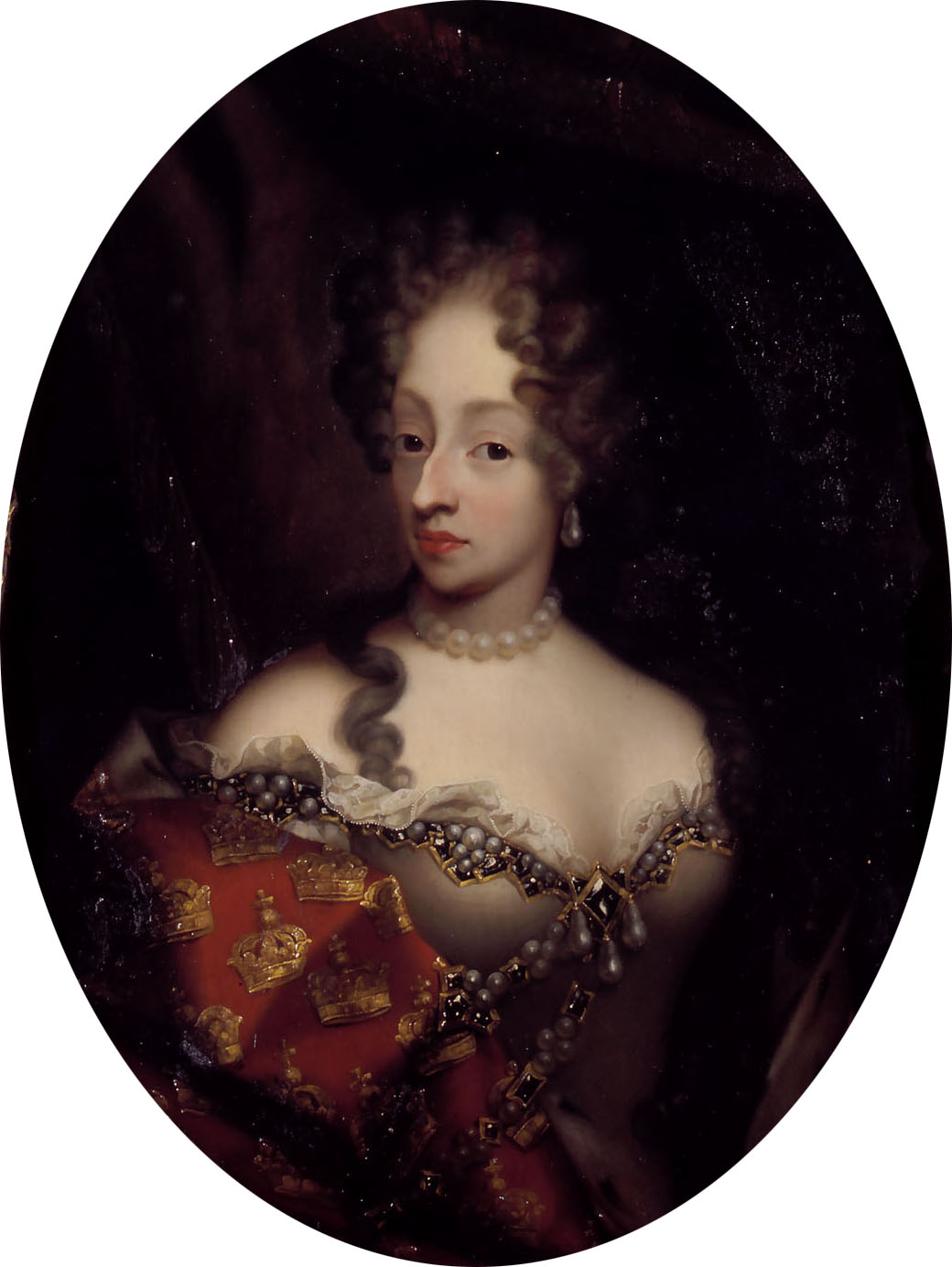
The town was named Charlotte Amalie in honor of Charlotte Amalie of Hesse-Kassel in 1691.

Known for its many beer halls, the town was founded in 1666 as Taphus (Danish for "beer house" or, literally, "tap house"). In 1691 the town was renamed Charlotte Amalie in honor of Danish King Christian V's wife, Charlotte Amalie of Hesse-Kassel. Between 1921 and 1936, the town was called St. Thomas by the United States. In 1936, the capital was recognized as Charlotte Amalie.

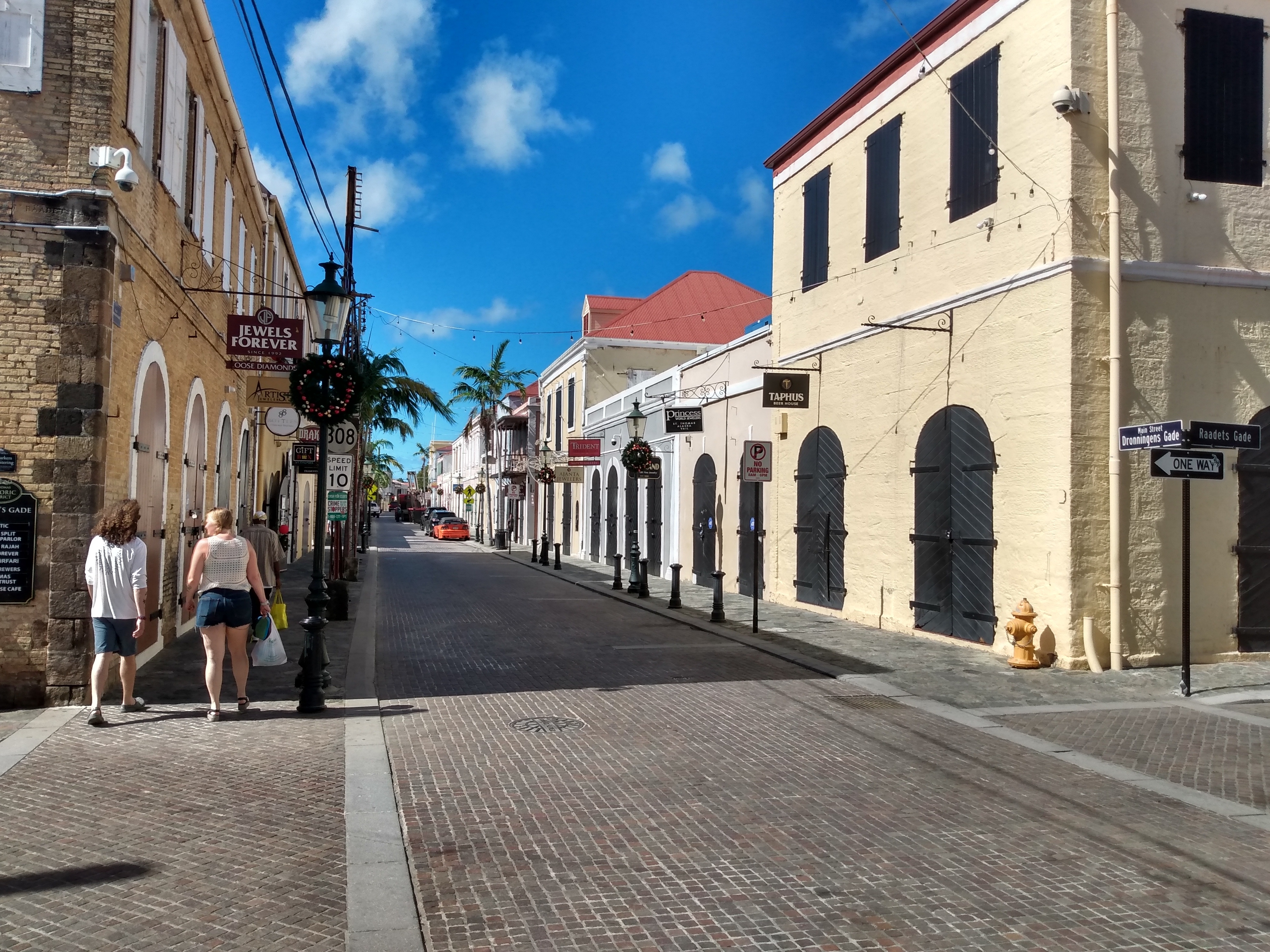
Intersection of Dronningens Gade (English: The Queen's Street aka Main Street) and Raadets Gade (Council's Street) early Sunday morning.

== Official designation ==
Like the rest of the U.S. Virgin Islands, the town of Charlotte Amalie has no local government and is directly administered by the territorial government. Its boundaries are defined by the Virgin Islands Code, and it is recognized as a town by the U.S. Census Bureau. Charlotte Amalie sits between the CDPs of Charlotte Amalie West and Charlotte Amalie East; together, these three CDPs comprise the subdistrict of Charlotte Amalie (or "the City").

== Neighborhoods ==
=== Downtown Charlotte Amalie ===
Downtown Charlotte Amalie is divided into three historical quarters, reflecting its Danish colonial past:

- Kongens Kvarter (English: The King's Quarter): This area contains many historic government buildings, Charlotte Amalie harbor defense structures and landmarks. It is central to administrative activities during the colonial period and today. Government House, the Virgin Islands Capitol Building, Superior Court of the Virgin Islands (in the Alexander A Farrelly Justice Complex) and United States District Court of the Virgin Islands (in the Ron Delugo Federal Building), Emancipation Garden, and Fort Christian are in this quarter.
- Dronningens Kvarter (English: The Queen's Quarter): This quarter features residential areas as well as the downtown commercial shopping district.
- Kronprinsens Kvarter (English: The Crown Prince's Quarter): This area historically housed various community as well as merchant activities like the sale of slaves and produce at the Rothschild Francis Square. It also includes a mix of residential and business spaces.

The transitions between the quarters in downtown Charlotte Amalie are not always clearly marked. The best way to identify them is by following Virgin Islands Route 308. This road, which passes through all three quarters, provides a practical guide to their boundaries.

- In Kongens Kvarter, Route 308 is known as Nørre Gade (English: North Street). It begins at the easternmost side of the quarter, at the intersection with Bjerge Gade (English: Mountain Street) Route 314. Here, the road is a two-lane street.
- As you enter Dronningens Kvarter, the road becomes Dronningens Gade (English: The Queen's Street) and transitions into a one-way street heading west.
- In Kronprinsens Kvarter, Route 308 changes its name to Kronprindsens Gade (English: The Crown Prince's Street) and returns to being a two-lane road.

Finally, as Route 308 exits downtown Charlotte Amalie, it becomes Harwood Highway, marking the end of the historic downtown district at the west end.

Downtown Charlotte Amalie is primarily bordered on the south by Virgin Islands Highway 30, commonly known as Veterans Drive or the Waterfront Highway. The northern boundary is less clearly defined, but a useful rule of thumb is that once the street names transition from Danish to English, you are likely outside of downtown Charlotte Amalie, as downtown Charlotte Amalie is the only area of St. Thomas with street names in Danish.

=== Frenchtown ===
Frenchtown is a distinctive neighborhood and fishing community within the Charlotte Amalie town limits, southwest of downtown and just south of Highway 30. Originally settled by French immigrants from Saint-Barthélemy in the late 19th and early 20th centuries, it has retained a strong French-Caribbean influence evident in its traditions, cuisine, and way of life. Frenchtown is known for its vibrant French heritage, with many families in the area tracing their ancestry to Saint-Barthélemy. The community celebrates French traditions, including culinary and religious practices. Historically, Frenchtown was a fishing village, and fishing remains an important part of its identity. It stands out with its French-named streets, reflecting its rich French-Caribbean heritage.

St. Thomas, Subdistricts, towns, and CDPs

== Landmarks ==
Charlotte Amalie has many buildings of historical importance and other important landmarks:

- St. Thomas Synagogue, the second-oldest synagogue in the western hemisphere and oldest under the United States flag;
- Frederick Lutheran Church;
- Blackbeard's Castle, a U.S. National Historic Landmark, built in the 17th century by the Danes;
- Fort Christian, the oldest standing structure in the Virgin Islands Archipelago;
- Emancipation Park, which has a copy of the Liberty Bell and a statue of a freed slave blowing a conch shell.

== History ==
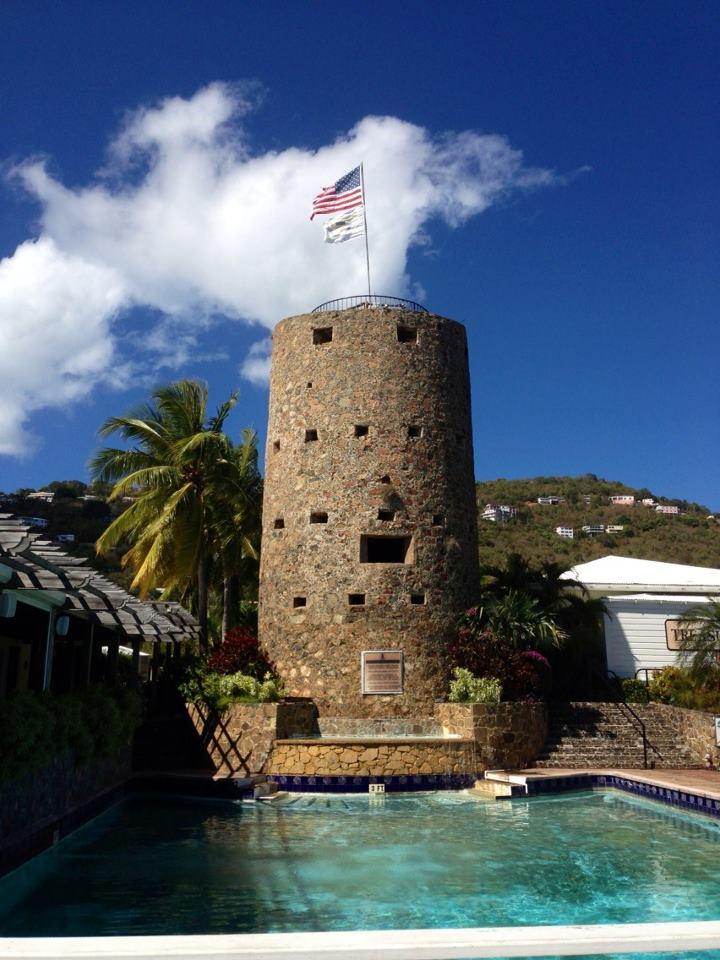
Blackbeard's Castle (Skytsborg) was built on Government Hill in 1679 and is today a U.S. National Historic Landmark.

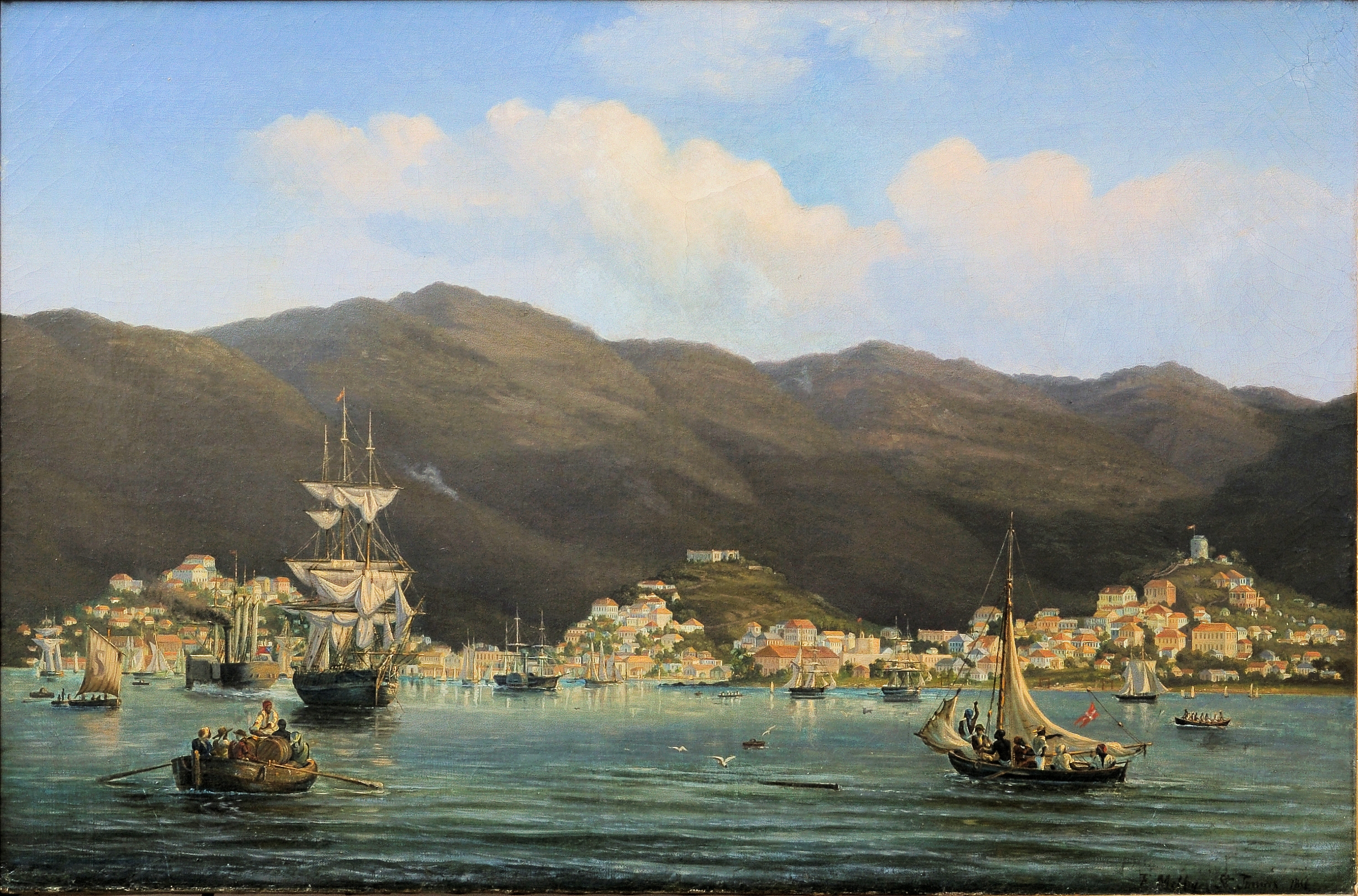
Charlotte Amalie in 1851, painted by Fritz Melbye

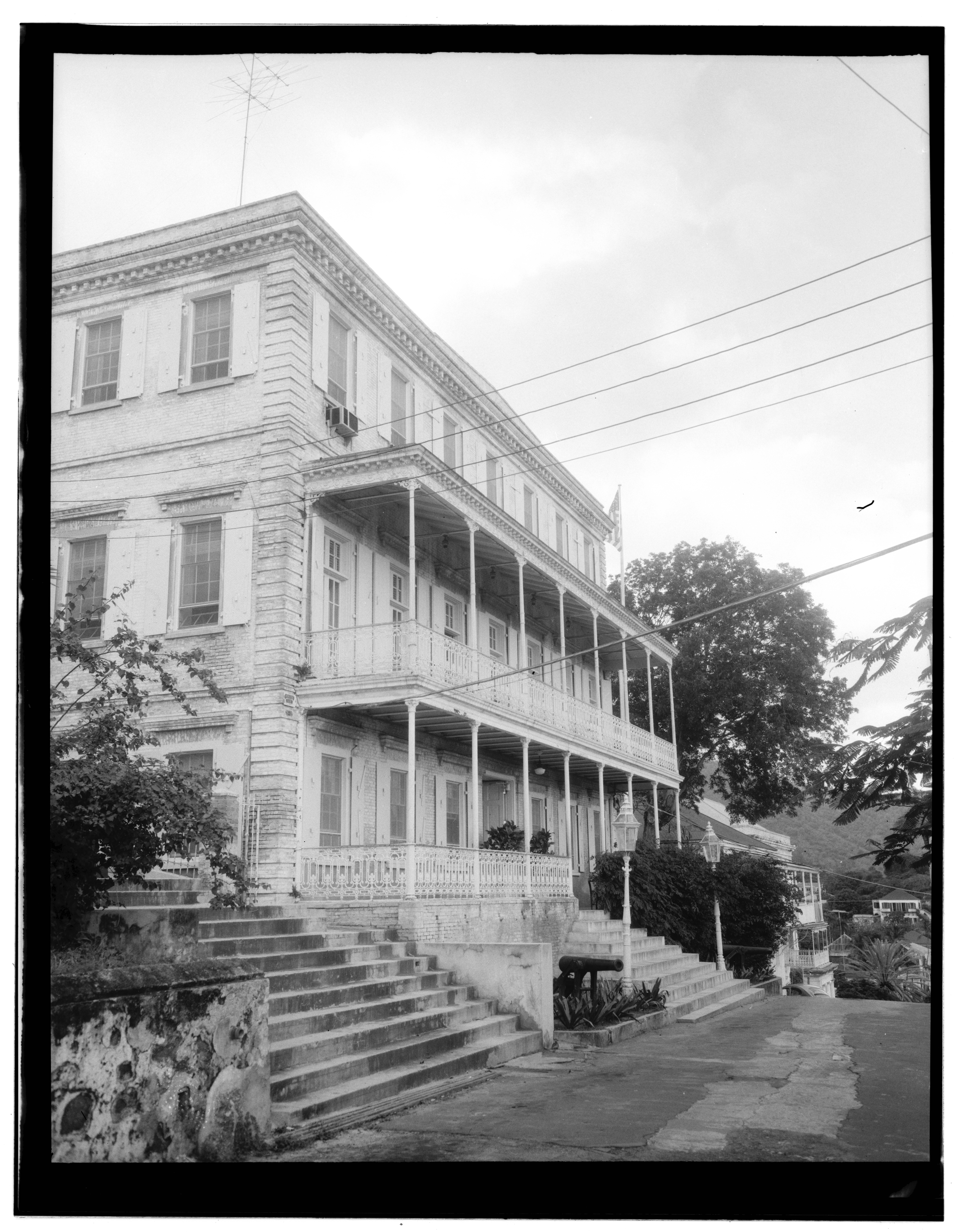
Government House in the 1950s

=== Early history ===
Archaeological records indicate that the present-day U.S. Virgin Islands have been home to native people groups, including the Taíno, Arawak, Kalinago/Carib, and the Ciboney people. Several of these lived in present-day Charlotte Amalie in small fishing communities. When Christopher Columbus arrived in 1493, during his second voyage to the Americas, the archipelago was still inhabited by Carib, Arawak, Ciboney, and Taíno peoples. As was the case in most of the Americas, these native populations died relatively quickly from disease when the Europeans settled.

While Columbus claimed the present-day U.S. Virgin Islands for Spain, early Spanish settlers focused more on Puerto Rico and other Caribbean islands. As a result, St. Thomas remained unprotected by the Spanish for many years, which left Charlotte Amalie's sheltered coves to be frequented by pirates, like Blackbeard, as well as mariners and other European settlers.

=== 17th century ===
The Danish West India Company chartered Charlotte Amalie in 1671 after King Christian V decided to secure them for plantations. As early as in 1672, the Danish government began building Fort Christian on Saint Thomas Harbor in Charlotte Amalie. In 1675, the Danes constructed four pubs near the water's edge on the Fort's western side. The Danish government supplied convicts to work the plantations but soon allowed colonists from neighboring islands to settle there and allowed the importation of slaves from Africa. In 1680, there were more black African slaves than white European settlers. Adjacent Water and Buck Islands served as pasture lands for the town, and Taphus was renamed Charlotte Amalie in 1691 after King Christian V's wife. It was the main port of the Virgin Islands Archipelago and was connected to about 50 plantations by one road, which remains the main highway today.

=== 18th century ===
In the early 18th century, more than 3,000 white settlers lived in town, and sugar production and slave trading were the economic mainstay. After the Danish government wanted direct administration of the archipelago in 1754, the capital was moved from Charlotte Amalie to Christiansted on the Island of Saint Croix. That partly made Charlotte Amalie's economy transition from slave trading and agriculture to general commerce. The slight did not hamper the town's growth, as merchants profiteered in arms and rum trades to belligerent countries.

In 1764, Charlotte Amalie was declared a free port by King Frederick V, and it became the busiest harbor in the Caribbean. The American Revolution in the 1770s was good news for the town, as it was thriving times for the local businessfolk. The town began to be filled by immigrants from Europe, Africa, and the Caribbean, most of them from other islands of the Lesser Antilles. By 1778, the Danish government had strengthened its military position by building Bluebeard's Castle and Blackbeard's Castle, lookout towers on the crests of the two hills in the town. The town prospered as a free port and U.S., Danish, Sephardic, German, French, British, Italian, and Spanish importing houses operated here. At the end of the 18th century, U.S. founding father and future architect of the U.S. Constitution Alexander Hamilton decided the town was so wealthy that "gold moved through the streets in wheel-barrows". At one point, Charlotte Amalie was the second-largest city in the Danish Realm, smaller only than Copenhagen.

=== 19th century ===
A growing share of the West Indian trade passed through the port in the beginning of the 1800s, and the rise of steamships made Charlotte Amalie an ideal coaling station for ships sailing between North and South America. In 1804, a major fire struck Charlotte Amalie, destroying more than 1,200 homes and stores. Two more fires came in 1805 and 1806, and the town lost another thousand buildings. Neighboring islands gradually began importing coal directly from producers, and Charlotte Amalie was sidestepped in trade in the early 1800s. The abolition of slavery in 1848 further diminished Charlotte Amalie's commercial role and the town suffered a brutal recession, as did most of the Caribbean following abolition.

During the American Civil War in the early 1860s, the town evolved into a smuggling center for ships running the federal blockade of ports in the Confederacy. As an acknowledgment of the port's smuggling success, the Danish government moved the archipelago's capital back to Charlotte Amalie in 1871. The latter half of the 1800s saw a cholera epidemic that killed thousands. Charlotte Amalie fell into an unsuccessful dormancy until the United States purchased the islands from Denmark in 1917.

=== 20th century ===
In 1915, concerned about German infiltration in the Lesser Antilles, the United States became interested in buying the U.S. Virgin Islands. The U.S. purchased the Danish West Indies in 1917 for $25 million. Charlotte Amalie was under U.S. Navy rule until 1931. The United States made Charlotte Amalie the main headquarters of the renamed United States Virgin Islands.

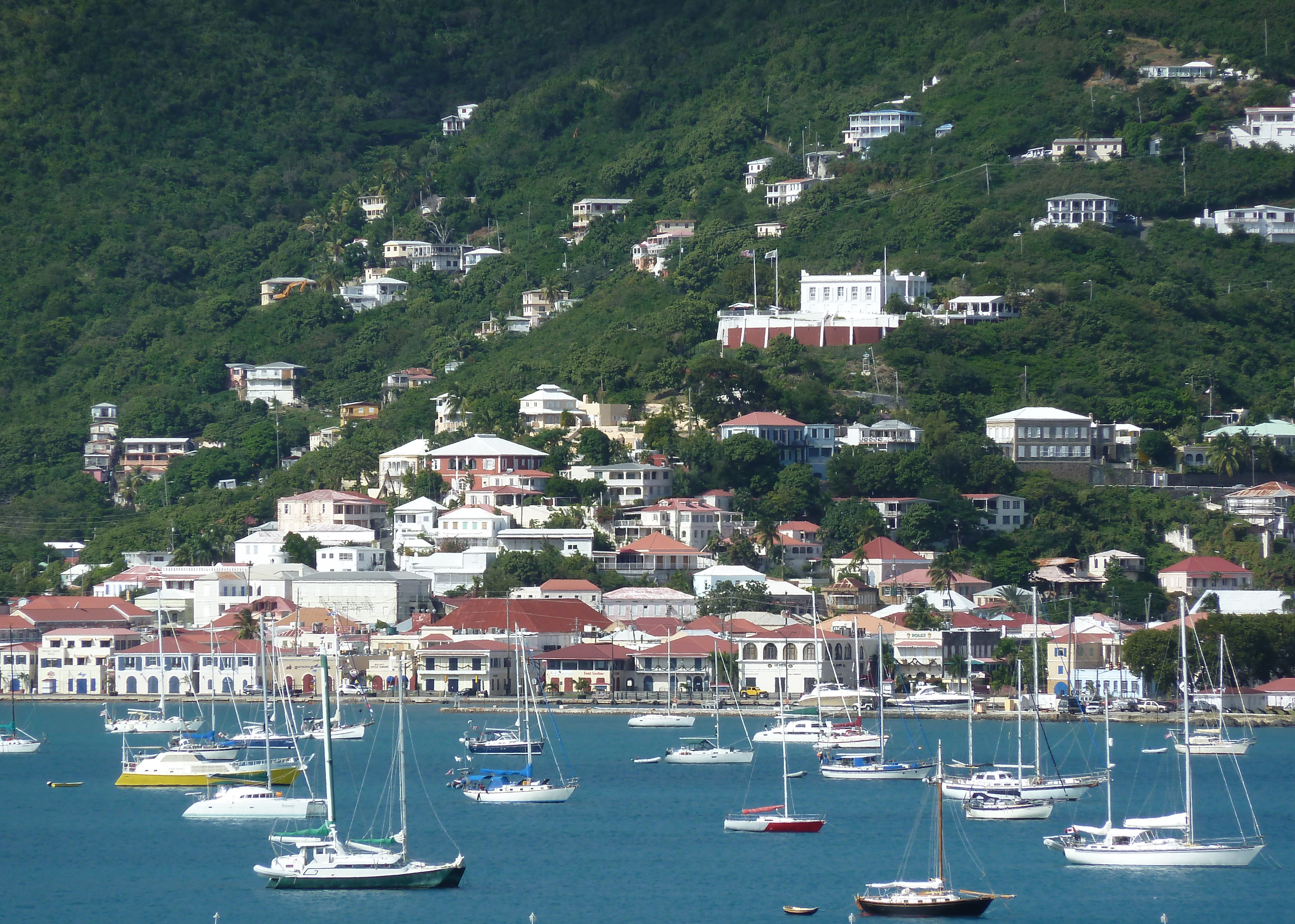
Charlotte Amalie Waterfront, 2011

When American tourists were barred from Cuba in 1960, some began visiting Charlotte Amalie instead. As an unincorporated U.S. territory, the U.S. Virgin Islands became a haven for U.S. citizens seeking luxury vacations or a second home in the Caribbean. During the mid-20th century, resorts began to be built and direct flights from the U.S. to Charlotte Amalie increased tourism. During the last half of the century, Charlotte Amalie experienced extraordinary economic growth, largely as a consequence of being a U.S. territory with growing U.S. tourism. The tourism has also led to preservation and conversion of historic buildings and homes. Many ancient commercial buildings were made into restaurants and shops. During the 1980s and '90s, many buildings were restored to how they looked 200 years earlier.

The tourism industry has thrived on the island, driving the economy of the U.S. Virgin Islands, but limited flatland space in the mountainous terrain constrains Charlotte Amalie's economic and population growth. The spread of hilltop homes overlooking the Caribbean crystal blue waters began trending in the 1960s as well.

== Geography ==
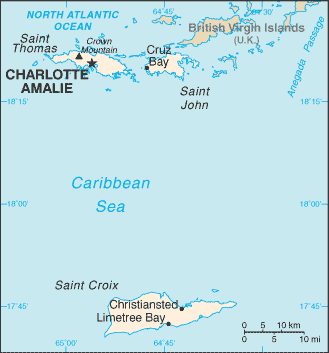
Map of the U.S. Virgin Islands

Mid-island, on the south shore of Saint Thomas, Charlotte Amalie stretches about 1.5 miles (2.4 km) around Saint Thomas Harbor from the Havensight district, where the cruise ships dock in Charlotte Amalie East, to the Crown Bay (Sub Base) area in Charlotte Amalie West. The red walls of Fort Christian and the open space of Emancipation Garden and the Vendor's Market are the center of downtown. Many of the town's historic buildings and businesses stand on the slopes of Government Hill just north of Emancipation Garden. This is "Kongens Quarter". To the west, spanning the area between Waterfront Dr and Dronningens Gade (Main Street), are a score of alleys, each lined with colonial warehouse buildings that have been turned into stores and urban malls. Protected by the peaks of Water Island and Hassel Island, Saint Thomas Harbor makes a deep indentation in the island. The bay affords vistas from lookout points as high as 1,500 feet (460 m), including Drake's Seat.

Charlotte Amalie is built on three low volcanic spurs: Frenchman Hill (Foretop Hill), Berg Hill (Maintop), and Government Hill (Mizzentop). Charlotte Amalie is located at coordinates 18°21' north and 64°57' west.

== Climate ==
Charlotte Amalie has a tropical savanna climate (Köppen Aw), characterized by very warm to hot temperatures year‑round and relatively low rainfall. The annual mean temperature is approximately 81 °F or 27 °C, with average monthly highs ranging from about 84 to 88 °F or 29 to 31 °C and average monthly lows around 73 to 77 °F or 23 to 25 °C.

Nighttime temperatures remain relatively high throughout the year, contributing to the city’s reputation as one of the hottest inhabited settlements under U.S. jurisdiction. While some sources describe Charlotte Amalie as the hottest inhabited location in the United States, no comprehensive climatological study has definitively ranked all inhabited locations to confirm this.

The city receives modest rainfall, averaging around 35 to 37 inches or 900 to 950 millimeters per year, with a wetter season from May through November and a drier period from December through April. Rainfall amounts and seasonal distribution are consistent with a tropical savanna climate.

According to WeatherSpark, Charlotte Amalie averages relatively few rainy days for a tropical climate, with the driest months from January to April typically seeing only about 3–5 days with measurable rainfall each, and the wettest months of September and October averaging around 10–11 rainy days. Overall, most months receive fewer than 10 days of rain, making precipitation less frequent than is typical for many tropical areas.

Climate data for Charlotte Amalie Airport (1991–2020 normals, extremes 1953–present)
Month	Jan	Feb	Mar	Apr	May	Jun	Jul	Aug	Sep	Oct	Nov	Dec	Year
Record high °F (°C)	93 (34)	93 (34)	94 (34)	96 (36)	97 (36)	99 (37)	98 (37)	99 (37)	98 (37)	97 (36)	95 (35)	92 (33)	99 (37)
Mean daily maximum °F (°C)	84.1 (28.9)	84.3 (29.1)	84.5 (29.2)	85.7 (29.8)	87.2 (30.7)	88.9 (31.6)	89.7 (32.1)	89.8 (32.1)	89.2 (31.8)	88.4 (31.3)	86.6 (30.3)	85.2 (29.6)	87.0 (30.6)
Daily mean °F (°C)	78.8 (26.0)	78.9 (26.1)	79.1 (26.2)	80.6 (27.0)	82.3 (27.9)	84.1 (28.9)	84.5 (29.2)	84.7 (29.3)	84.4 (29.1)	83.3 (28.5)	81.6 (27.6)	80.1 (26.7)	81.9 (27.7)
Mean daily minimum °F (°C)	73.6 (23.1)	73.5 (23.1)	73.8 (23.2)	75.5 (24.2)	77.5 (25.3)	79.3 (26.3)	79.3 (26.3)	79.6 (26.4)	79.5 (26.4)	78.3 (25.7)	76.6 (24.8)	74.9 (23.8)	76.8 (24.9)
Record low °F (°C)	63 (17)	62 (17)	60 (16)	62 (17)	66 (19)	67 (19)	66 (19)	64 (18)	64 (18)	64 (18)	61 (16)	62 (17)	60 (16)
Source: NOAA

== Population ==
=== Demographics ===
Population history of Charlotte Amalie town
Year	Pop.	±%
1870	11,681	—
1880	11,764	+0.7%
1890	9,455	−19.6%
1901	8,540	−9.7%
1911	8,247	−3.4%
1917	7,747	−6.1%
1930	7,036	−9.2%
1940	9,801	+39.3%
1950	11,469	+17.0%
1960	12,880	+12.3%
1970	12,200	−5.3%
1980	11,842	−2.9%
1990	12,331	+4.1%
2000	11,044	−10.4%
2010	10,354	−6.2%
2020	8,194	−20.9%
Source: US Census Bureau

=== 2020 Census ===
Charlotte Amalie town, U.S. Virgin Islands – Racial and ethnic composition Note: the US Census treats Hispanic/Latino as an ethnic category. This table excludes Latinos from the racial categories and assigns them to a separate category. Hispanics/Latinos may be of any race.
Race / Ethnicity (NH = Non-Hispanic)	Pop 2020	% 2020
White alone (NH)	334	4.08%
Black or African American alone (NH)	5,675	69.26%
Native American or Alaska Native alone (NH)	28	0.34%
Asian alone (NH)	167	2.04%
Native Hawaiian or Pacific Islander alone (NH)	1	0.01%
Other race alone (NH)	36	0.44%
Mixed race or Multiracial (NH)	179	2.18%
Hispanic or Latino (any race)	1,774	21.65%
Total	8,194	100.00%

Age:

- 21.8% under age 20
- 30.0% age 20 to 44
- 29.3% age 45 to 64
- 18.9% age 65 and over

=== Religion ===
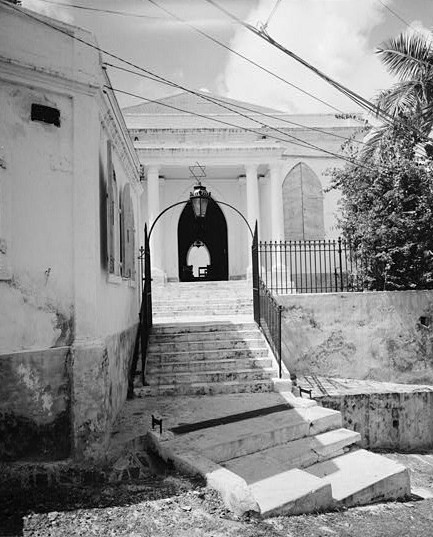
St. Thomas Synagogue

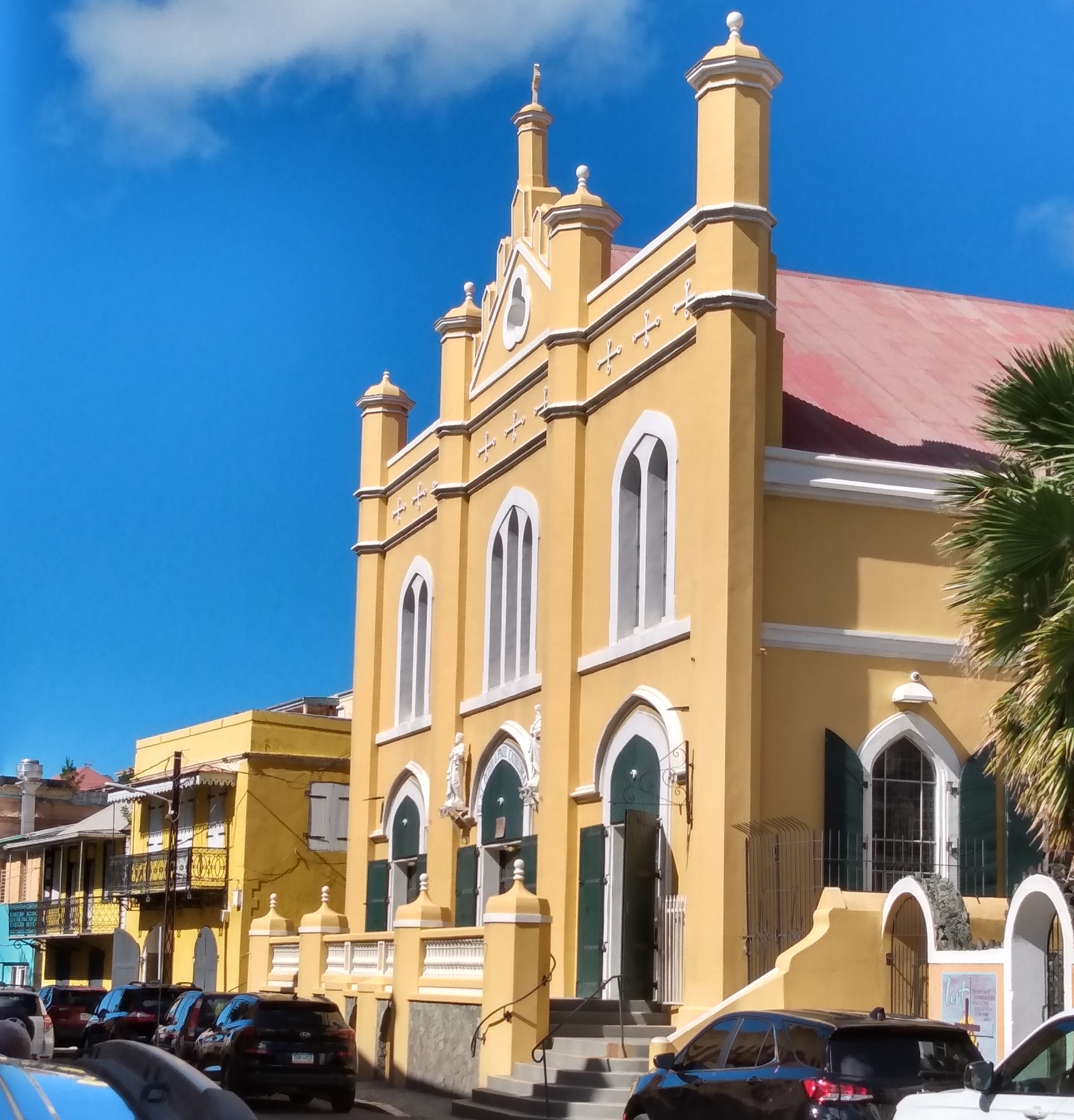
Saint Peter and Paul Cathedral

According to the CIA World Factbook, more than 95% of the people describe themselves as Christians. 42% are Baptist, 34% Catholic and 17% Episcopalian. There are also Jewish, Hindu and Muslim populations of European, Middle Eastern, and Caribbean origin.

=== Historic places of worship ===
The town's Saints Peter and Paul Cathedral is the episcopal see of the Roman Catholic Diocese of Saint Thomas, which covers the American Virgin Islands and is the sole suffragan of the Archdiocese of Washington.

Saint Thomas is home to one of the oldest Jewish communities in the Western Hemisphere as Sephardic Jews began to settle the island in the 18th century as traders and merchants. The St. Thomas Synagogue in Charlotte Amalie is the second oldest synagogue in the western hemisphere and oldest under the United States flag.

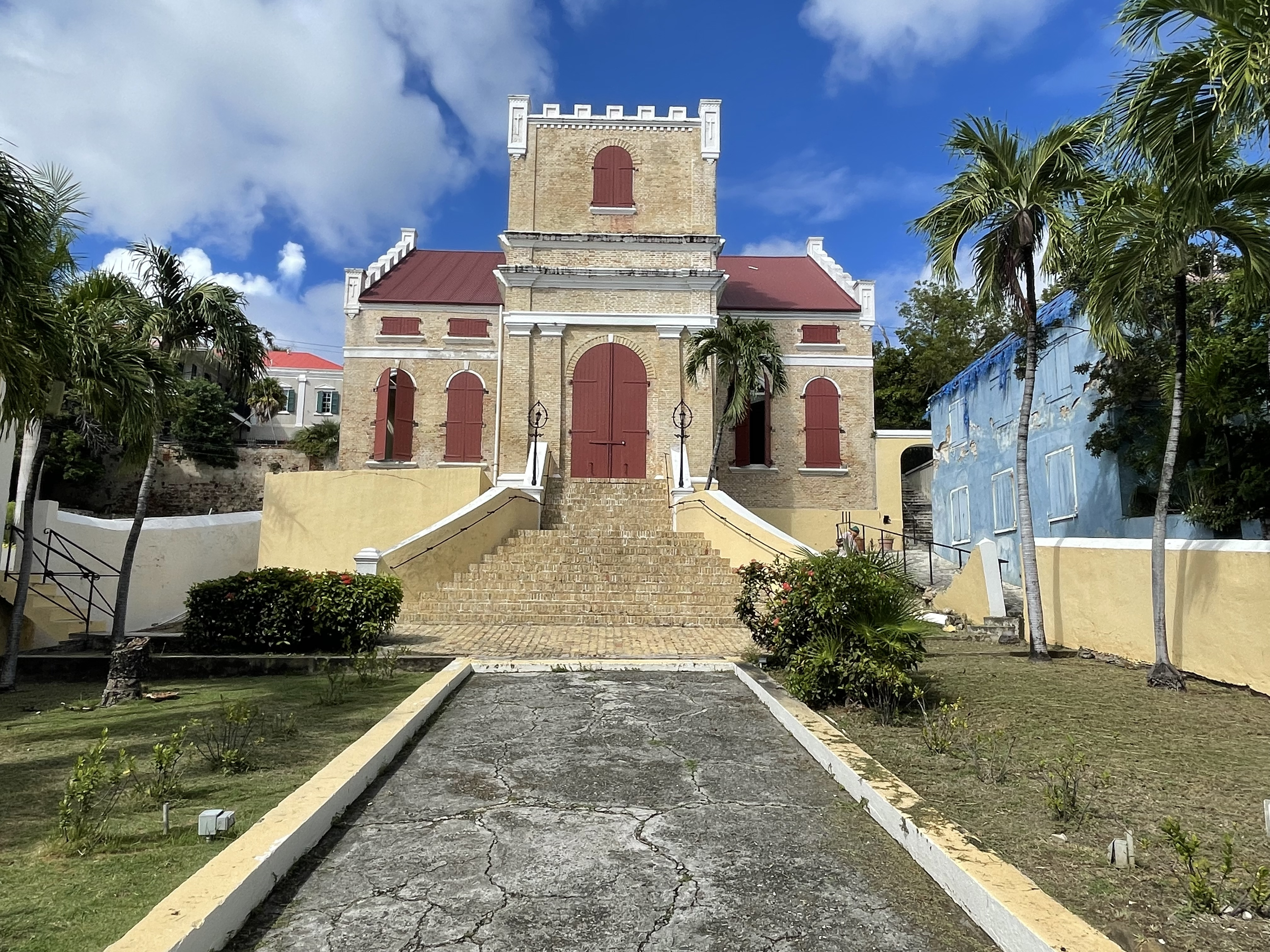
Frederick Evangelical Lutheran Church

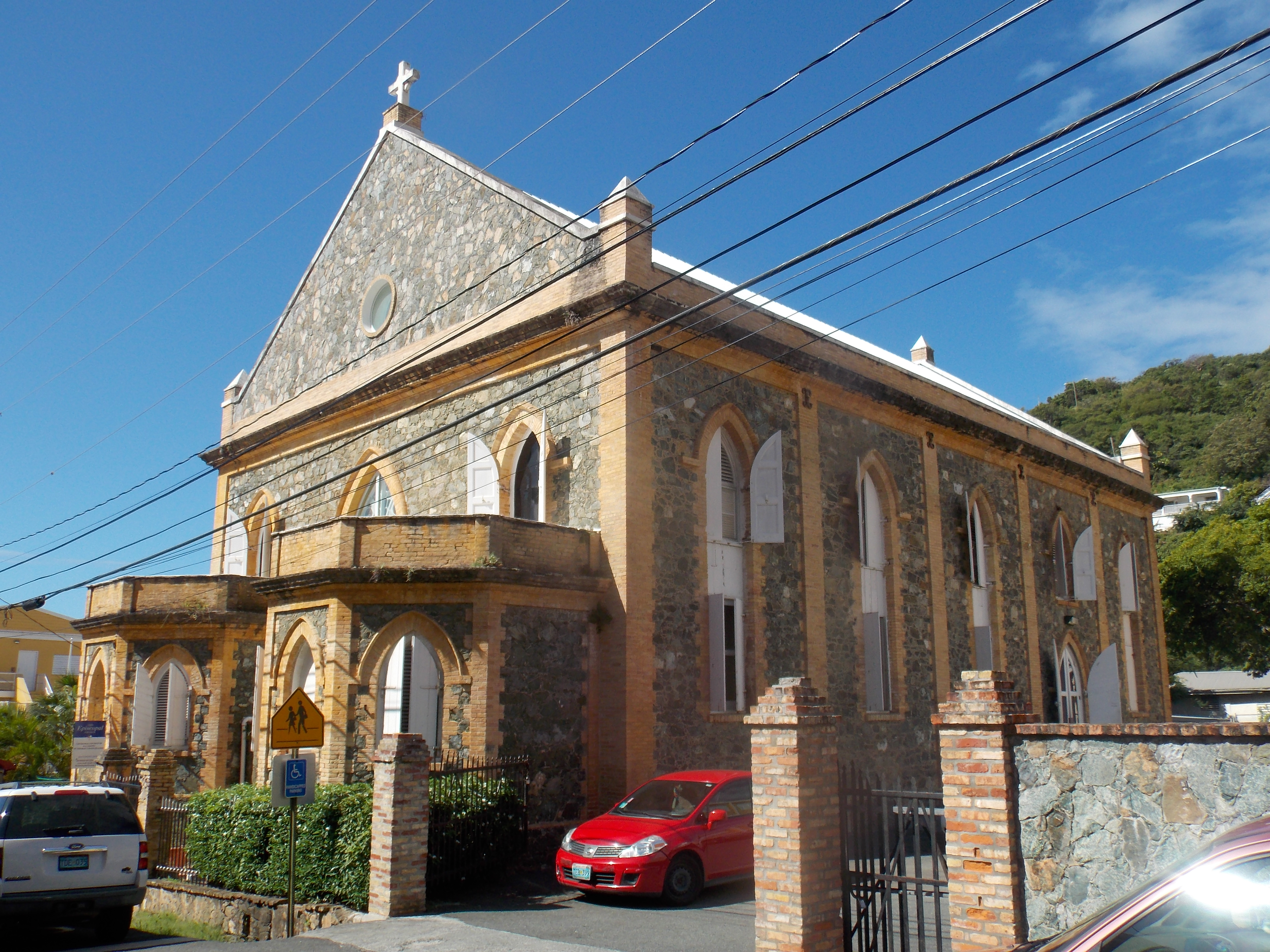
Anglican Church

US Virgin Islands, Frederick Evangelical Lutheran Church was founded in 1666. The present structure was completed in 1793.

The Episcopal Diocese of the Virgin Islands (Anglican Church) is a diocese of the Episcopal Church in the United States of America (ECUSA/T.E.C) which includes both the United States Virgin Islands and the British Virgin Islands. The diocese is a part of Province II of the Episcopal Church.

=== Languages and literacy ===
More than 95% of the population is literate.

Although English is the official language, most people speak a dialect called Virgin Islands Creole, which differs from standard English in many ways. Virgin Islands Creole is used informally and standard United States English (spoken with a Virgin Islands accent) is usually preferred in school, at work, and in more formal conversations. Most older children and adults can quickly switch between Virgin Islands Creole and United States English. Spanish is spoken by 16.8% and French Patois is spoken by 6.6% of the town's population. While Spanish is spoken by migrants from Puerto Rico and immigrants from the Dominican Republic, creoles are spoken by immigrants from St. Barthelemy, Dominica, and Haiti; Dutch and Papiamento are spoken by immigrants from Saba, Aruba, St. Maarten and Curaçao.

== Economy ==
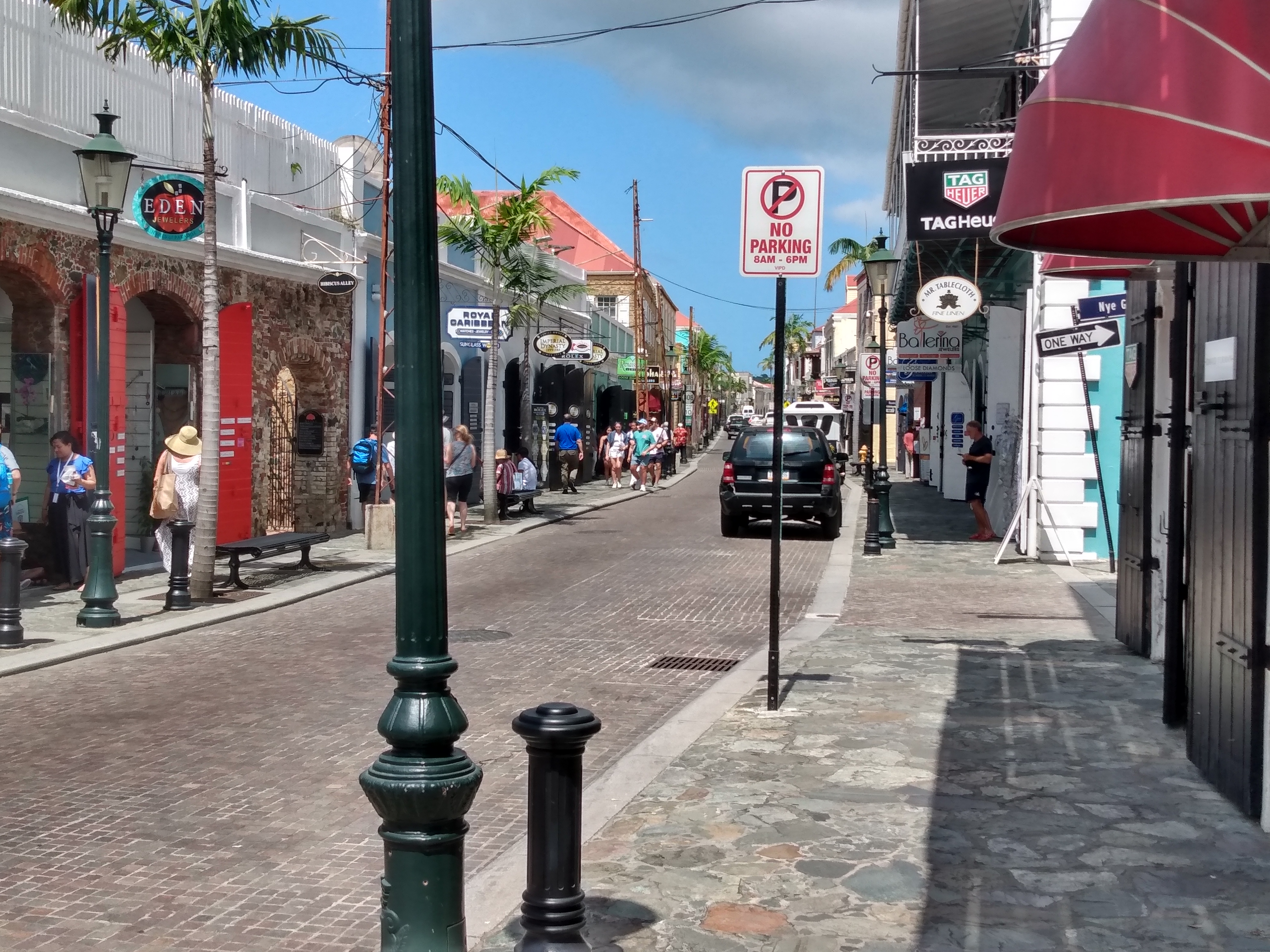
Dronningens Gade (English: The Queen's Street aka Main Street) and Nye Gade (English: New Street)

The economy is based on tourism, handicrafts, jewelry, and the production of rum, bay rum, and jams. As well as being the USVI's political capital, "the City" is the port capital of the U.S. Virgin Islands. Charlotte Amalie is the third most popular cruise ship destination in the Caribbean Sea. Up to eleven cruise ships can occupy the harbor on any given day, though usually there are about five.

=== Tourism ===
About 1.5 plus million cruise ship passengers visit on average per year.

Tourist attractions include Blackbeard's Castle, one of the most visited attractions in the town, Bluebeard's Castle, Fort Christian, the Legislature Building, the 99 Steps Stairway, Emancipation Garden, Market Square, Seven Arches Museum, St. Thomas Synagogue, Frederick Lutheran Church, and the Weibel Museum. Tourists arrive by airplane at the Cyril E. King Airport, about 2 miles (3.2 km) west of Charlotte Amalie, the Crown Bay cruise ship port, or the Havensight cruise port. In the 21st century, Charlotte Amalie has benefited from proximity to San Juan, Puerto Rico, where passengers from larger aircraft can transfer to smaller aircraft for a 30-minute flight to Charlotte Amalie. The town has also become a jumping-off place for other islands in the U.S. and British Virgin Islands. In this century, more high-speed ferries have left Charlotte Amalie for St. Croix, St. John, and Tortola. A seaplane wharf is near the west end of the inner harbor; the planes take passengers to St. Croix.

Because of its duty-free policies, the Territory is sometimes called "the duty-free capital of the world". Charlotte Amalie has more jewelry shops and perfume vendors than anywhere else in the Caribbean and is known for its outdoor shopping Vendors' Plaza. Main Street (Dronningens Gade) has many major shops, including Tiffany, Breitling, Rolex, and Fresh Produce.

Havensight and Crown Bay docks are other shopping areas, with a number of stores adjacent to the cruise ship docks. Along Dronningens Gade are more than 400 shops, most of them selling jewelry and in the Havensight Mall. The western end (near the intersection with Strand Gade) is called "Market Square." Once the site of the biggest slave market auctions in the Caribbean Basin, today it is an open-air cluster of stalls where resident farmers and gardeners gather occasionally to sell their produce.

== Culture ==
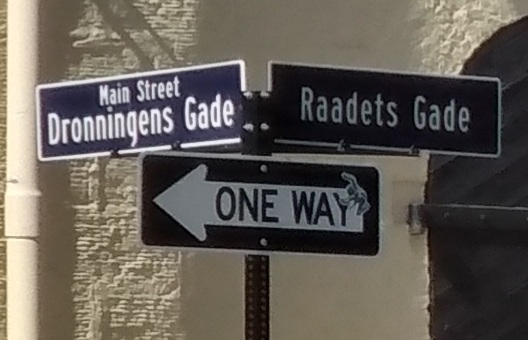
Street sign at the corner of Dronningens Gade (English: The Queen's Street aka Main Street) and Raadats Gade (English: Council's Street) in Charlotte Amalie St. Thomas

The culture is a mixture of U.S. socioeconomic activities and Afro/Latino-Caribbean culture, with a Danish influence. There are American fast food chains in the town, as well as local restaurants serving only Caribbean cuisine. Grocery stores contain items from the US mainland, and local items such as rum. Seafood and local produce can be found at open-air markets.

=== Danish influence ===
Named in honor of the wife of Danish King Christian V, Charlotte Amalie has a strong Danish influence. The Danes left castles, cemeteries, churches, forts, town homes, sugar mills, and plantation houses that are still standing. Many geographical names are in Danish and many locals have Danish heritage. The most widely spoken language, Virgin Islands Creole, has many words and expressions from Danish; for instance, Danish words like "skål" (toast), "bjerg" (mountain) and "frikadeller" (meatballs) are commonly used. Much of the historic colonial architecture still stands and some words, like "street", are commonly replaced by their Danish equivalents.

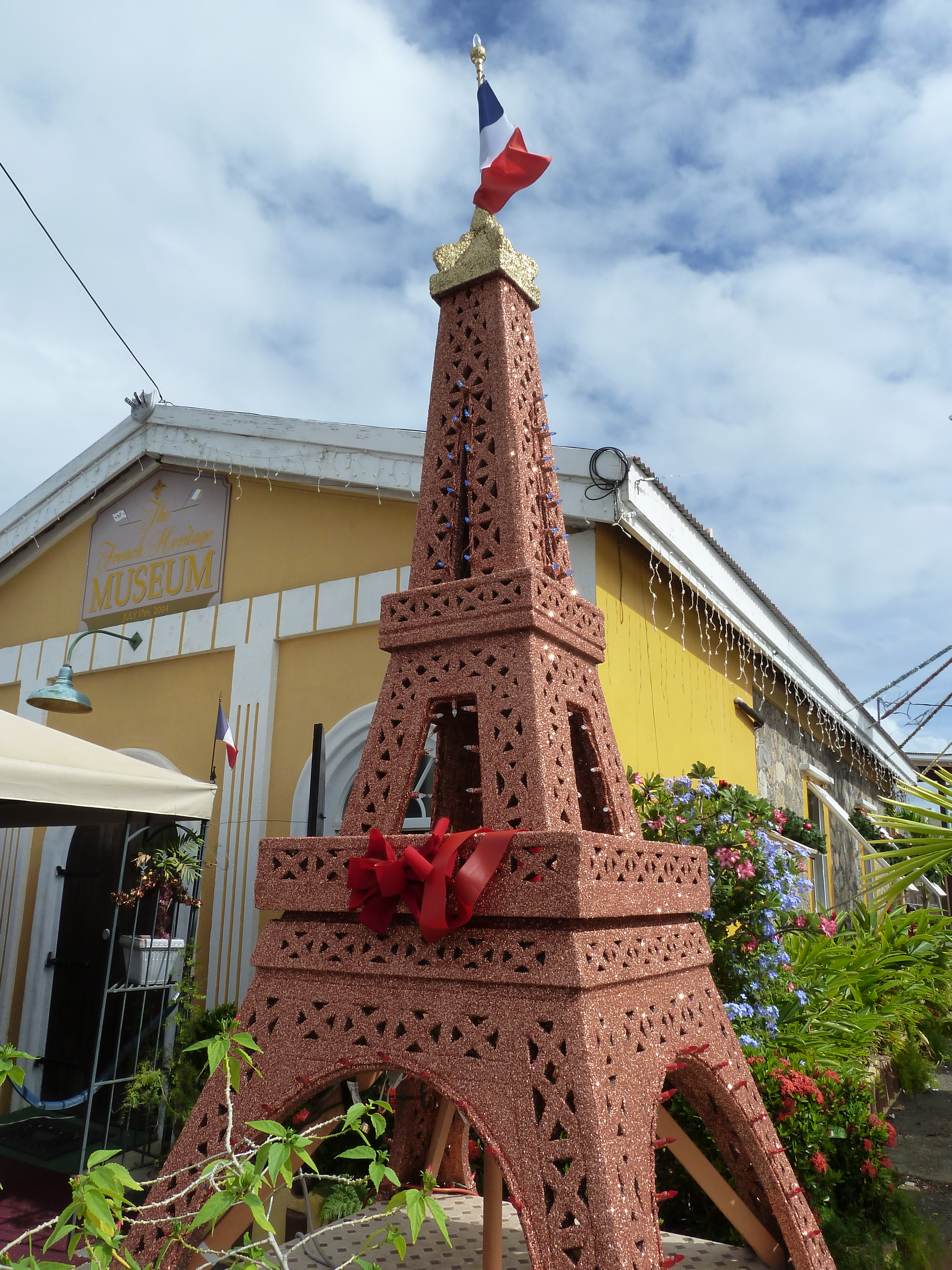
French Heritage Museum

=== Architecture ===
Charlotte Amalie has the Caribbean's largest collection of colonial buildings. Most of them are classic Caribbean adaptions of English Georgian architecture built by the Danes, dating to the 1830s.

=== Museums and art galleries ===
Museums and art galleries in Charlotte Amalie include:

- Fort Christian
- Saint Thomas Historical Trust Museum
- Camille Pissarro Gallery
- Seven Arches Museum
- Weibel Memorial Museum
- French Heritage Museum
- 81C Contemporary Art Gallery

== Transportation ==
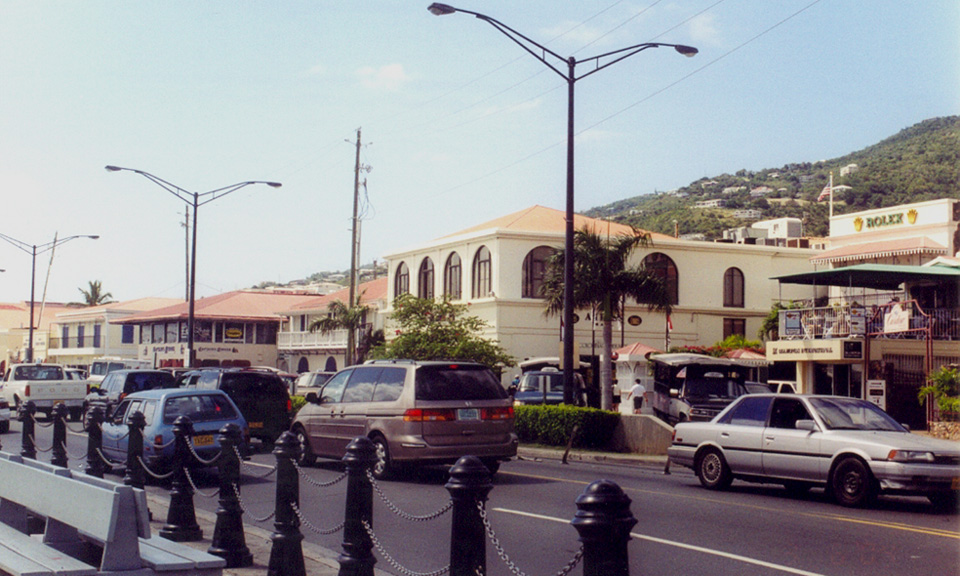
Waterfront Drive

There are three main roads in Charlotte Amalie. Waterfront Drive, also called Veteran's Drive, fronts the harbor and extends from Havensight Mall to Frenchtown. This four-lane road is best navigated by car or taxi. Dronningens Gade, also called "Main Street", Norre Gade, run parallel to the waterfront. Wimmelskafts Gade or "Back Street", is one block farther inland, parallel to the shoreline. Street names in the town are remnants of the Island's Danish past.

Charlotte Amalie is notable for being the only U.S. capital city (either of a territory or state) where traffic drives on the left side of the road, despite a 14-year period of attempting to conform to the United States' right-side principle, which was abandoned by popular demand. The United States Virgin Islands (USVI) is the only United States jurisdiction of any kind where the rule of the road is to drive on the left. But virtually all passenger vehicles are left-hand drive due to imports of U.S. vehicles. making the driving experience in the USVI very similar to that in The Bahamas, and for largely the same reasons.

=== Airports ===
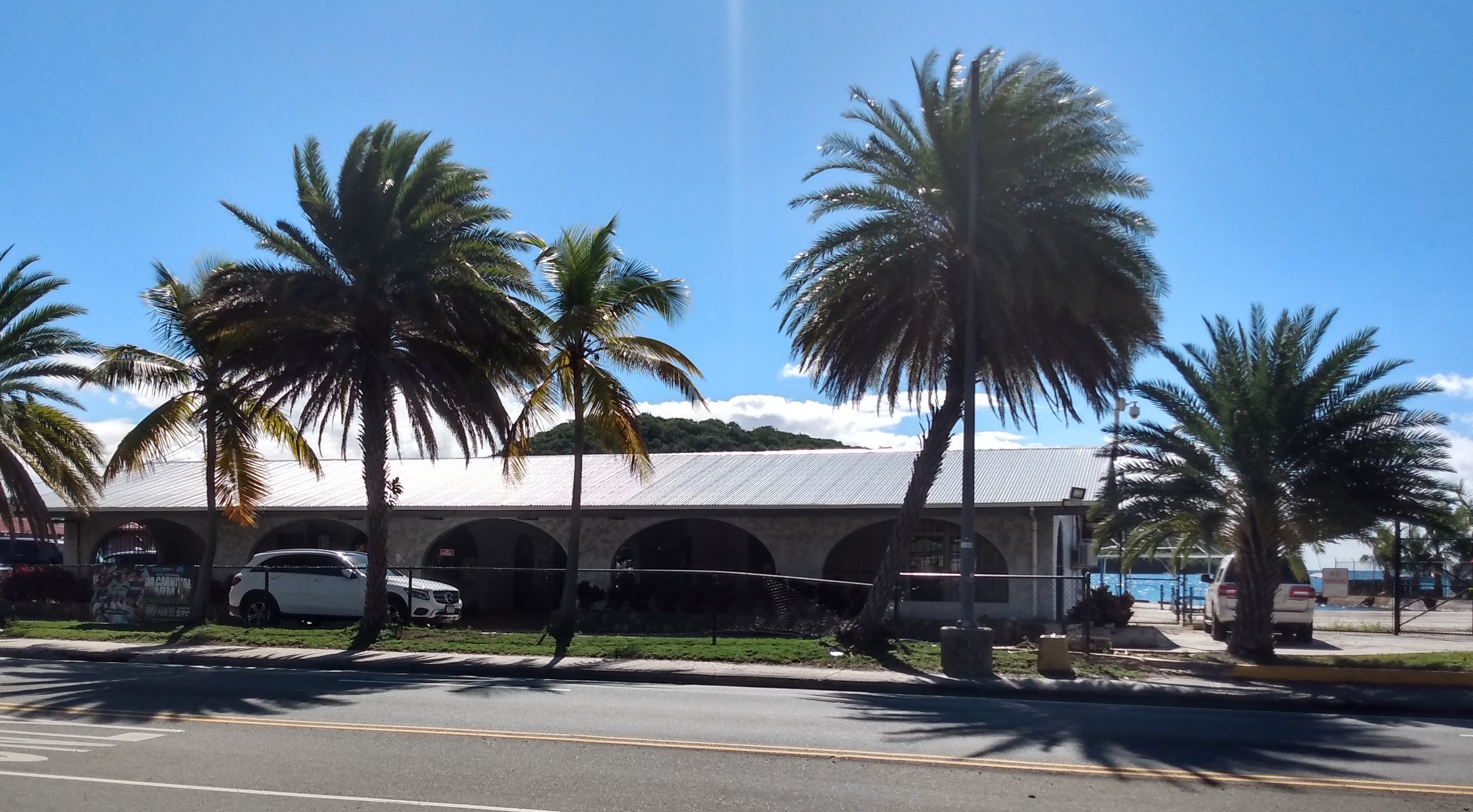
The Charlotte Amalie Harbor Seaplane Base Terminal

The Cyril E. King Airport serves Charlotte Amalie but is in Charlotte Amalie West. The only air transport available in the town of Charlotte Amalie is the Charlotte Amalie Harbor Seaplane Base (IATA: SPB, FAA LID: VI22), also known as St. Thomas Seaplane Base. It is just east of Frenchtown on Highway 30. This private-use airport is owned by the Virgin Islands Port Authority. At this base, a seaplane shuttle service is operated between Christiansted, U.S. Virgin Islands, St. Croix and Charlotte Amalie, St. Thomas

=== Ferry terminals ===
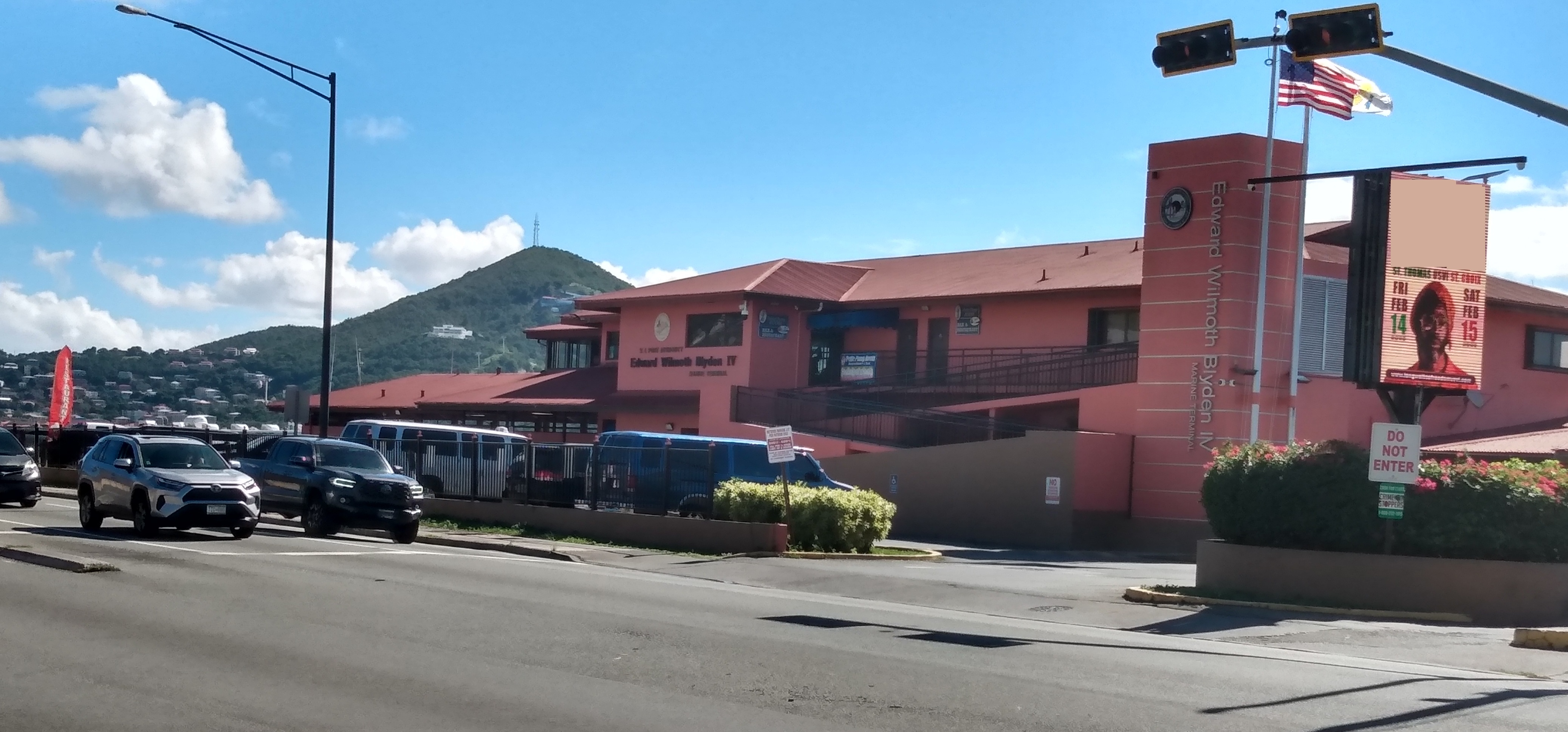
Edward Wilmoth Blyden Marine Terminal

The Edward William Blyden Ferry Terminal, located next to the Charlotte Amalie Harbor Seaplane Base, serves as the only ferry terminal to surrounding islands from the town of Charlotte Amalie. From the terminal nonstop service to Christiansted, U.S. Virgin Islands, Tortola and Virgin Gorda in the British Virgin Islands, and Cruz Bay, U.S. Virgin Islands (seasonal). To accommodate the entry of foreign travelers entering into US Virgin Islands, the terminal has U S Customs and Border Patrol Offices and officers stationed at the terminal.

=== Public transit ===
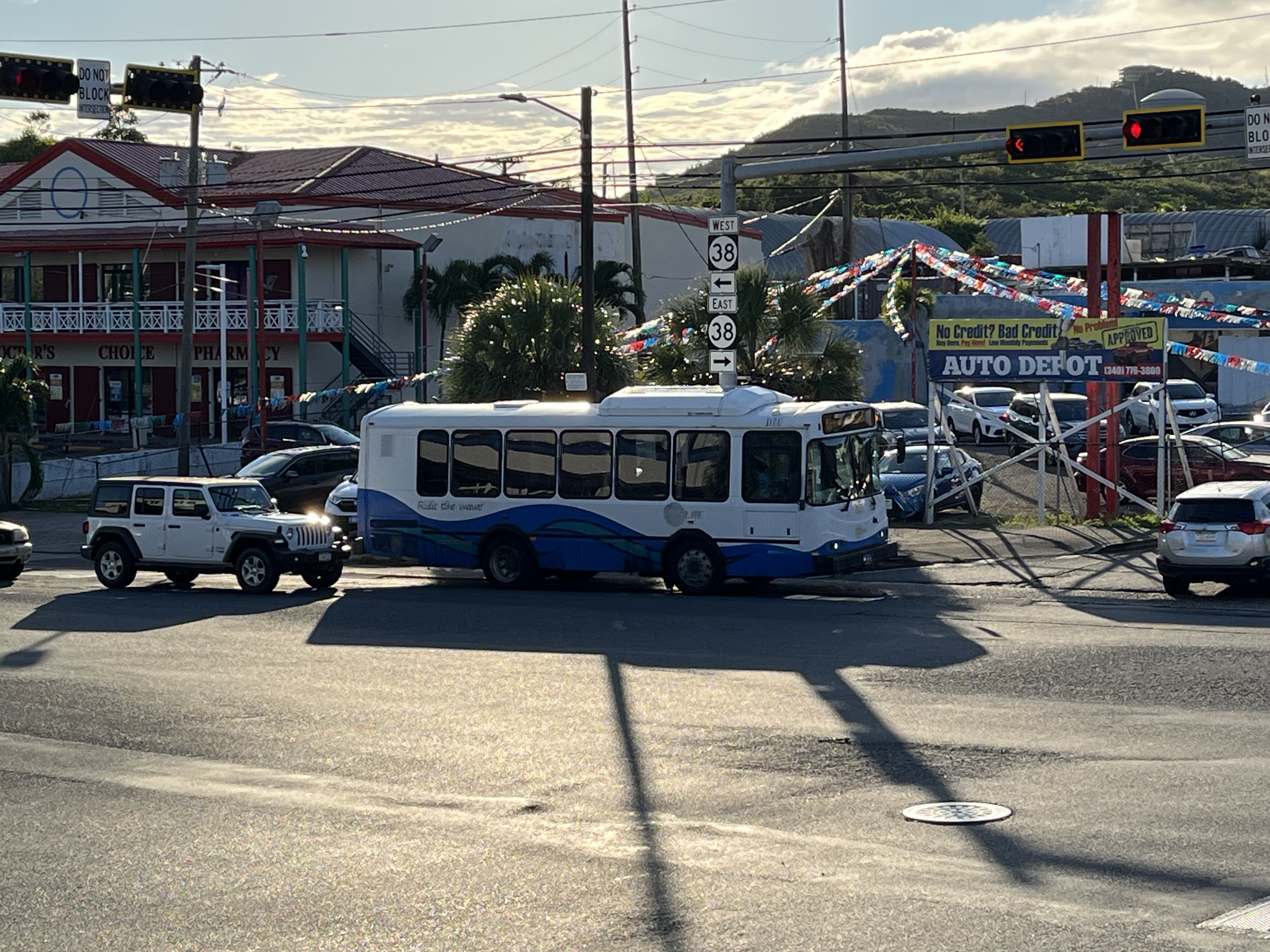
VITRAN bus on St Thomas.

The VITRAN (Virgin Islands Transit) system is a comprehensive public transportation system serving the U.S. Virgin Islands. It encompasses various modes of transportation, including buses, paratransit services and ferries. The buses and paratransit services are the only modes of transport available within Charlotte Amalie. All VITRAN bus routes on St. Thomas serve the town of Charlotte Amalie.

=== Alternative Fixed Path Transit ===
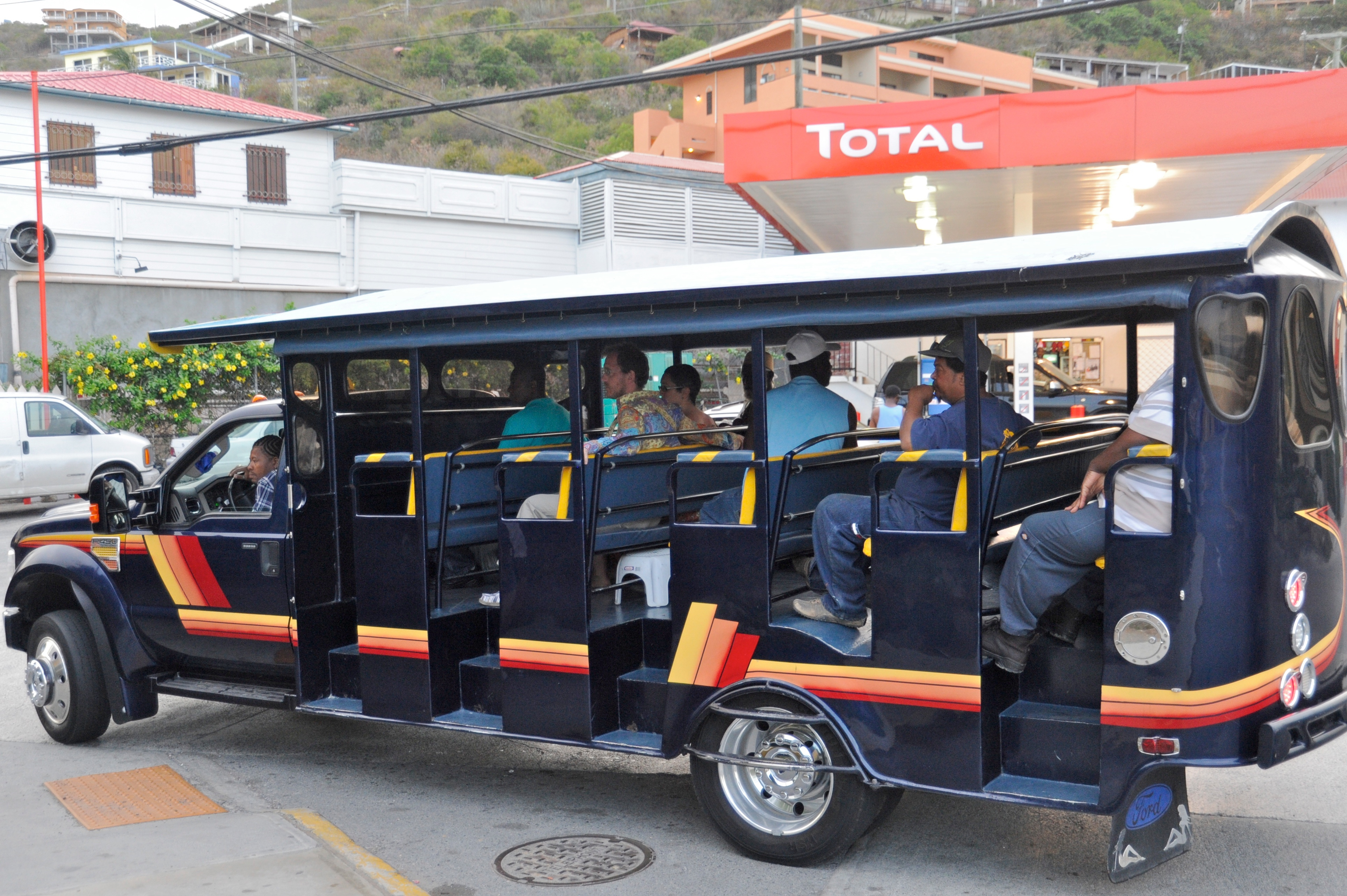
Safaris

"Safaris", as they are called locally, are open air taxis mounted onto the back of a pickup truck. Some "safari" drivers operate on several VITRAN bus fixed paths including the suspended VITRAN 101 route. Those that do are locally called "Dollar Ride", a term used to describe the original fare charged that matched the old VITRAN fee. Those following a VITRAN fixed path, charge the same amount as VITRAN buses (plus bag/luggage fee) as they are required to do by the rate set by the Taxi Cab Commission. Before entering a "safari", riders should verify with the driver that they are "dollar ride" and the path.

On days when there are many cruise ships in the harbor however, utilizing these fixed path safaris are difficult to catch as most drivers suspend their fixed path service to serve cruise passengers because they make more money doing so.

=== Highways and routes ===
In the USVI, highways and major routes beginning with 3-4 are on St. Thomas. Many of them pass through or border the town of Charlotte Amalie. Major highways and roads include:

- Highway 30 (VI 30) passes through Charlotte Amalie as Waterfront Highway/Veteran's Drive.
- Route 35 (VI 35) enters Charlotte Amalie as Maude Proudfoot Drive (Mafolie Rd.) and ends at Highway 30 as Hospital Gade.
- Route 38 (VI 38) Alton Adams Sr. Drive and becomes Dronningens Gade East (not connected to Dronningens Gade).
- Route 40 (VI 40) enters Charlotte Amalie as Theodore Bushelte Dr. and becomes Gamle Nordsidevej in the Charlotte Amalie.
- Route/Highway 308 (VI 308) start in Charlotte Amalie at Route 314 as Norre Gade and becomes Harwood Highway at the west end of Charlotte Amalie.
- Route 313 (VI 313) Rumer Drive connecting Highway 30 to Route 38.
- Route 314 (VI 314) Connects Route 38 on the west side of Bluebeard's Hill to Route 38 on the east side of Bluebeard's Hill.
- Route 316 (VI 316) First Avenue

=== Step streets ===
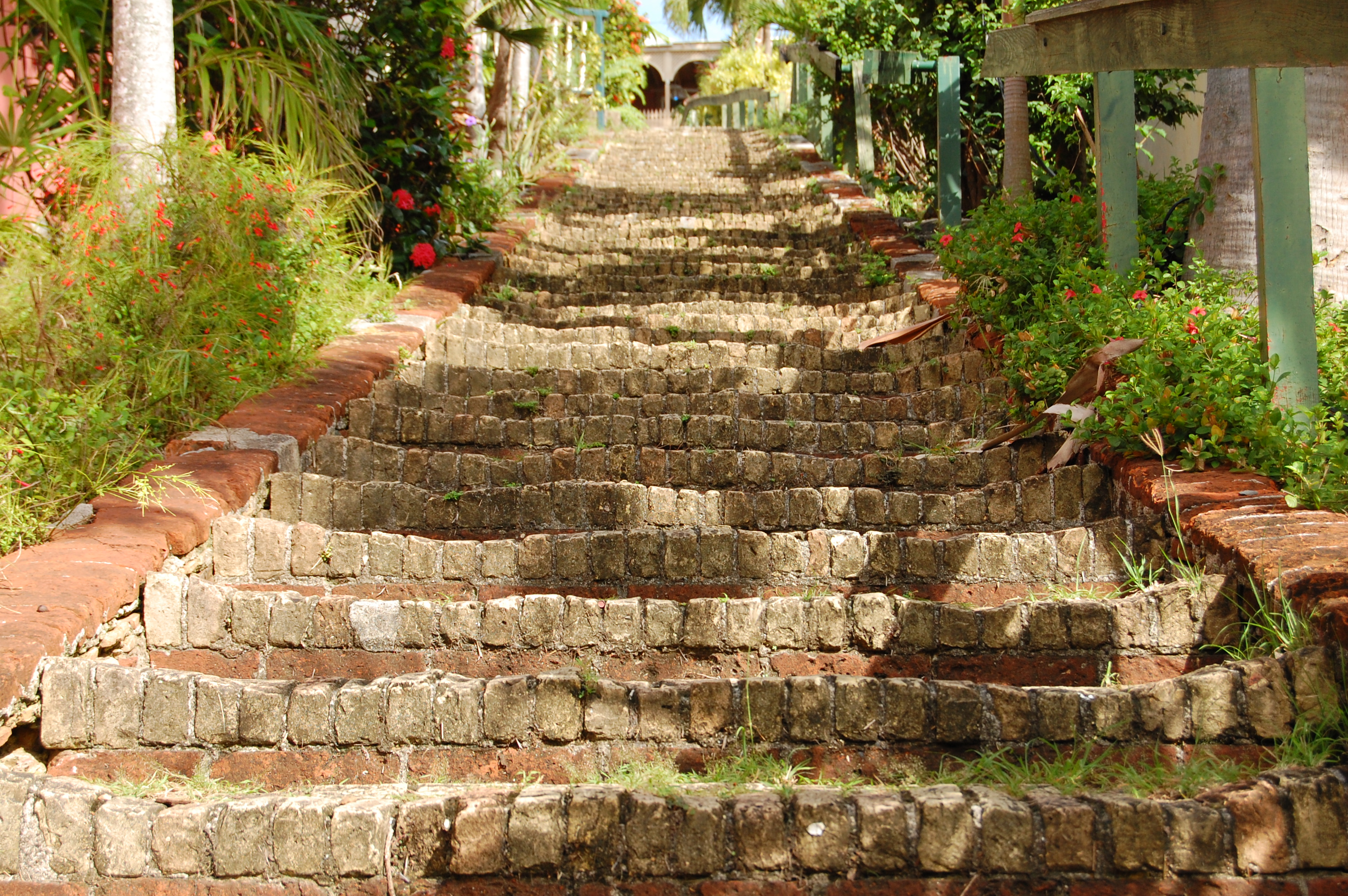
Steps made from the ballast bricks of the tall ships coming from the Old World

Charlotte Amalie is renowned for its historic staircases (or “step streets”), a unique feature of its architectural and cultural heritage. The 45 step streets date to the Danish colonial era and were built to help residents and visitors navigate the steep hills. They serve as a network of pedestrian pathways connecting different levels of the hilly terrain of Charlotte Amalie. These "step streets", like the actual streets in Charlotte Amalie, have names that end with "Gade". For example, Store Taarne Gade (English: Great Tower Street) is the famed 99 Steps and Bred Gade (English: Broad Street or Wide Street) are two of the most famous "step streets". Many of the staircases remain functional and in use today, offering not only utility but also a glimpse into the town's history. The steps reflect the ingenuity of Danish urban planning during colonial times, allowing for the development of a town in a challenging, hilly environment. The steps are a functional part of the town's layout and a symbol of the architectural ingenuity and cultural legacy of Charlotte Amalie.

== Education ==
St. Thomas-St. John School District operates public schools.

Elementary Schools:

- Jane E Tuitt Elementary School

K-8 Schools: Lockhart K-8 School

Junior High Schools:

- Addelita Cancryn Junior High School

High Schools

- Charlotte Amalie High School

Adult Education

- Raphael O. Wheatley Skill Center

Parochial and Private schools:

- All Saints Cathedral School
- Sts. Peter & Paul Catholic School
- Calvary Christian Academy

Universities and Colleges: The University of the Virgin Islands, Orville E. Kean Campus, serves the residents of Charlotte Amalie but is located in Charlotte Amalie West.

== Notable people ==
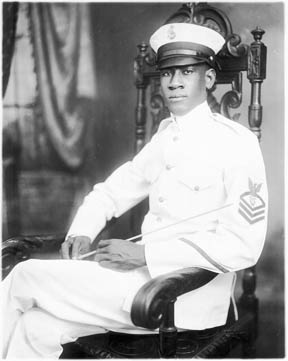
Alton Augustus Adams was the first African-American bandmaster in the United States Navy.

- Alton Adams − lyrics writer of the Virgin Islands National Anthem and first band master of Afro-Caribbean heritage for the United States Navy
- Edward Wilmot Blyden − ambassador and is credited by some as having laid the foundation of West African nationalism or Pan-Africanism
- Callix Crabbe − Major League Baseball player
- Hannah Davis − fashion model
- Kelsey Grammer − actor, director and producer
- Emile Griffith − boxer who won world championships in the Welterweight and Middleweight divisions
- Alexander Hamilton − born in neighboring island of Nevis; moved to the Danish West Indies (present-day U.S. Virgin Islands), where he grew up
- Elrod Hendricks − Major League Baseball player
- Julian Jackson − boxer
- J. Raymond Jones − political activist
- Al McBean − Major League Baseball player
- Alonzo G. Morón (1909–1971) – university president, educator, and civil servant; born in Charlotte Amalie, Danish West Indies (present-day U.S. Virgin Islands)
- Ralph Moses Paiewonsky − governor
- Calvin Pickering − Major League Baseball player
- Jasmin St. Claire − former pornographic actress
- Charles Sainte-Claire Deville − French geologist
- Henri Sainte-Claire Deville − French chemist
- Camille Pissarro − a key member of the French Impressionist painters
- Rashawn Ross − trumpeter who tours with Dave Matthews Band
- Roy Lester Schneider − governor and physician
- Morris Simmonds − German physician and pathologist
- Karrine Steffans − New York Times best-selling author
- Terence Todman − ambassador
- Denmark Vesey − leader of planned slave uprising in Charleston, South Carolina
- Peter von Scholten − governor general
- David Levy Yulee − first Jewish member of the United States Senate

== Gallery ==
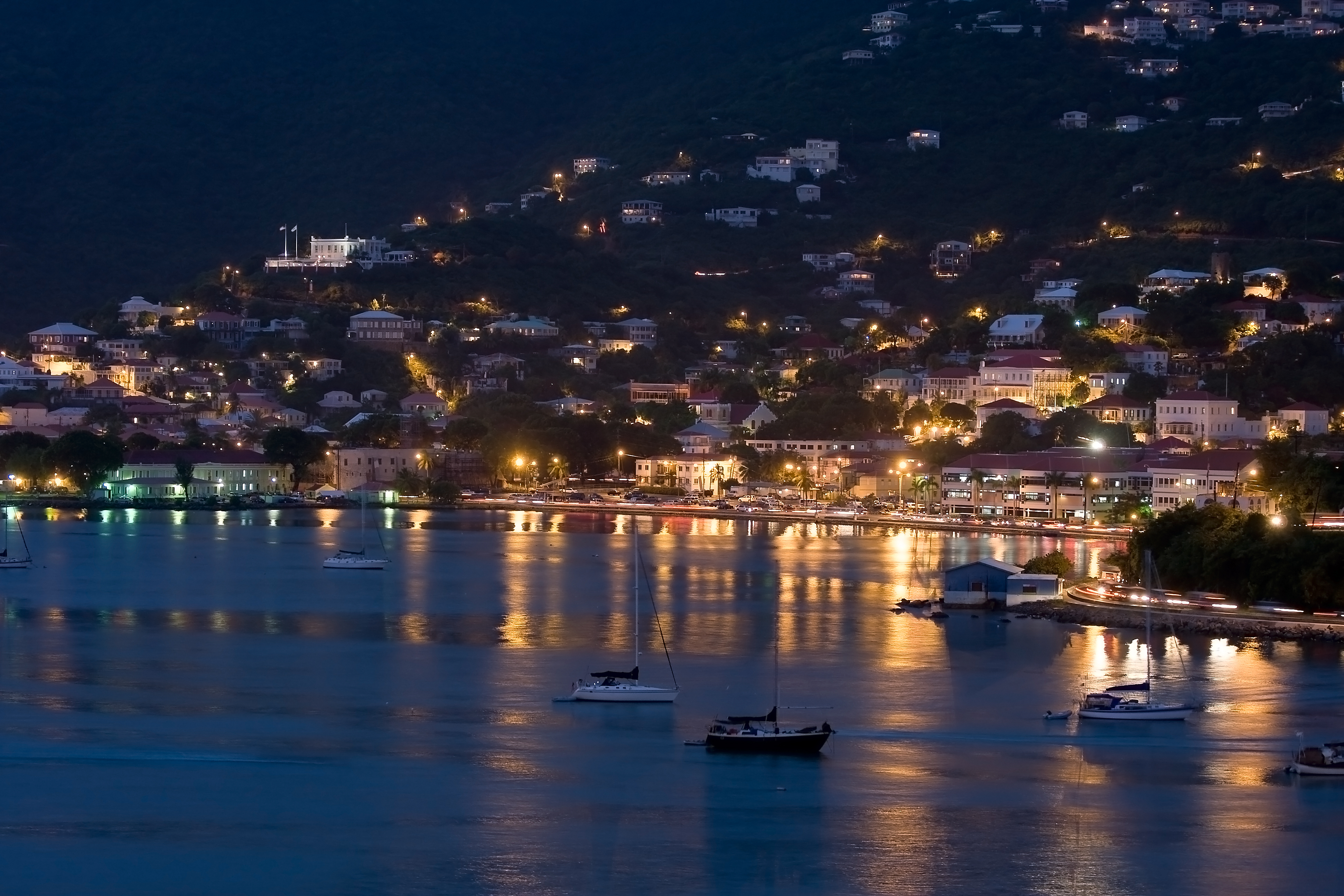
Saint Thomas Harbor at night

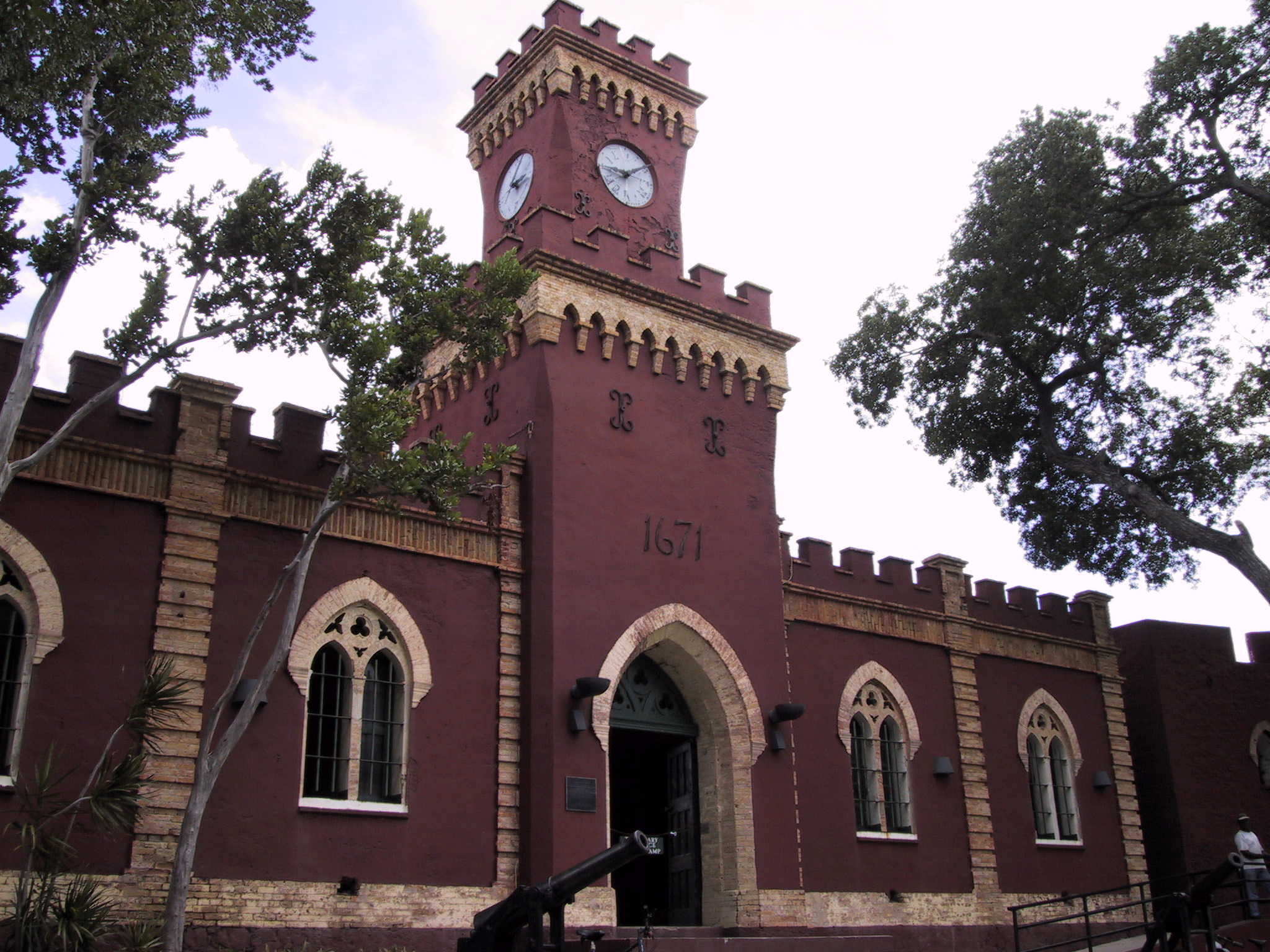
Fort Christian

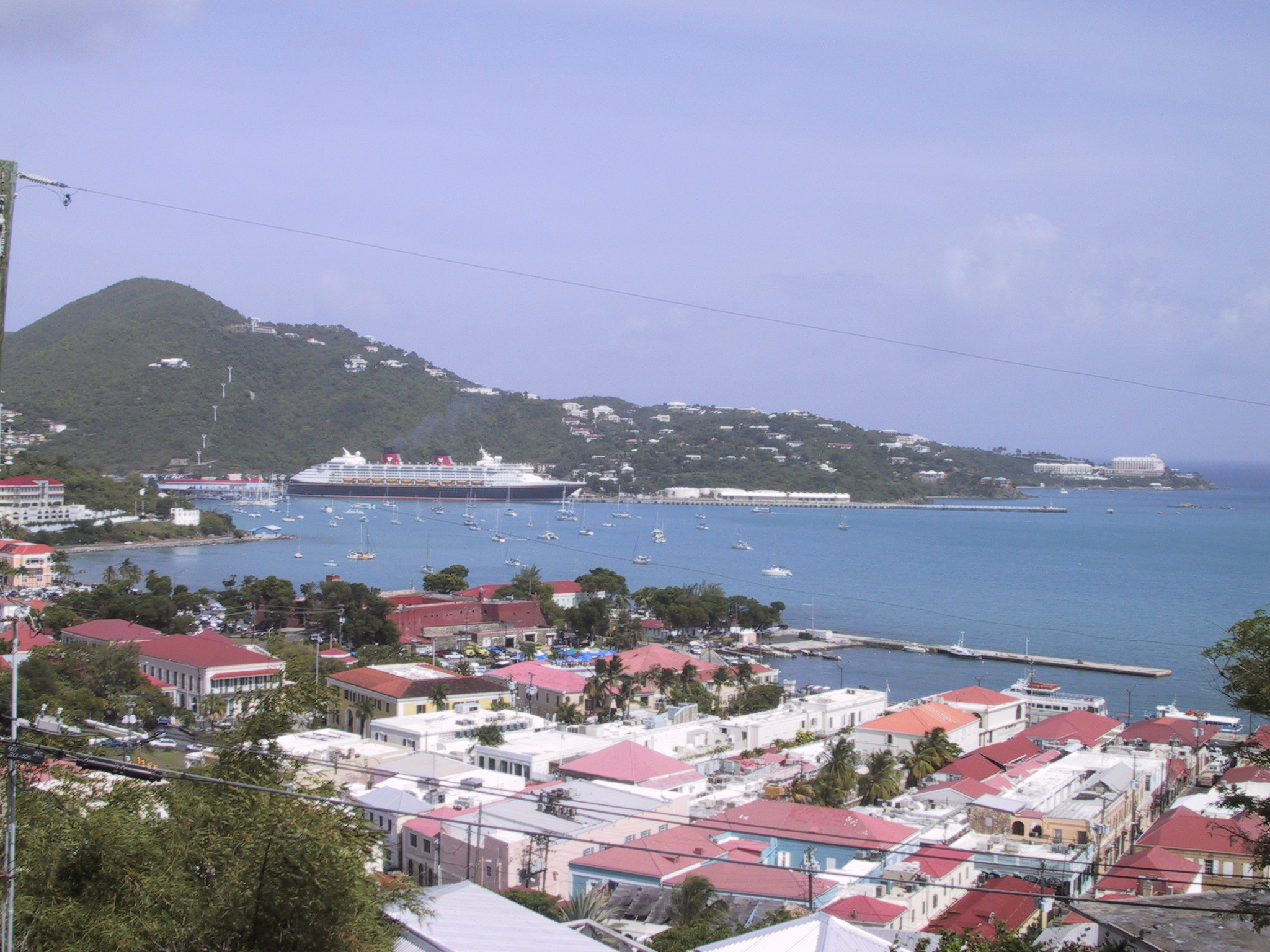
Charlotte Amalie from a Dronningens Quarter overlook

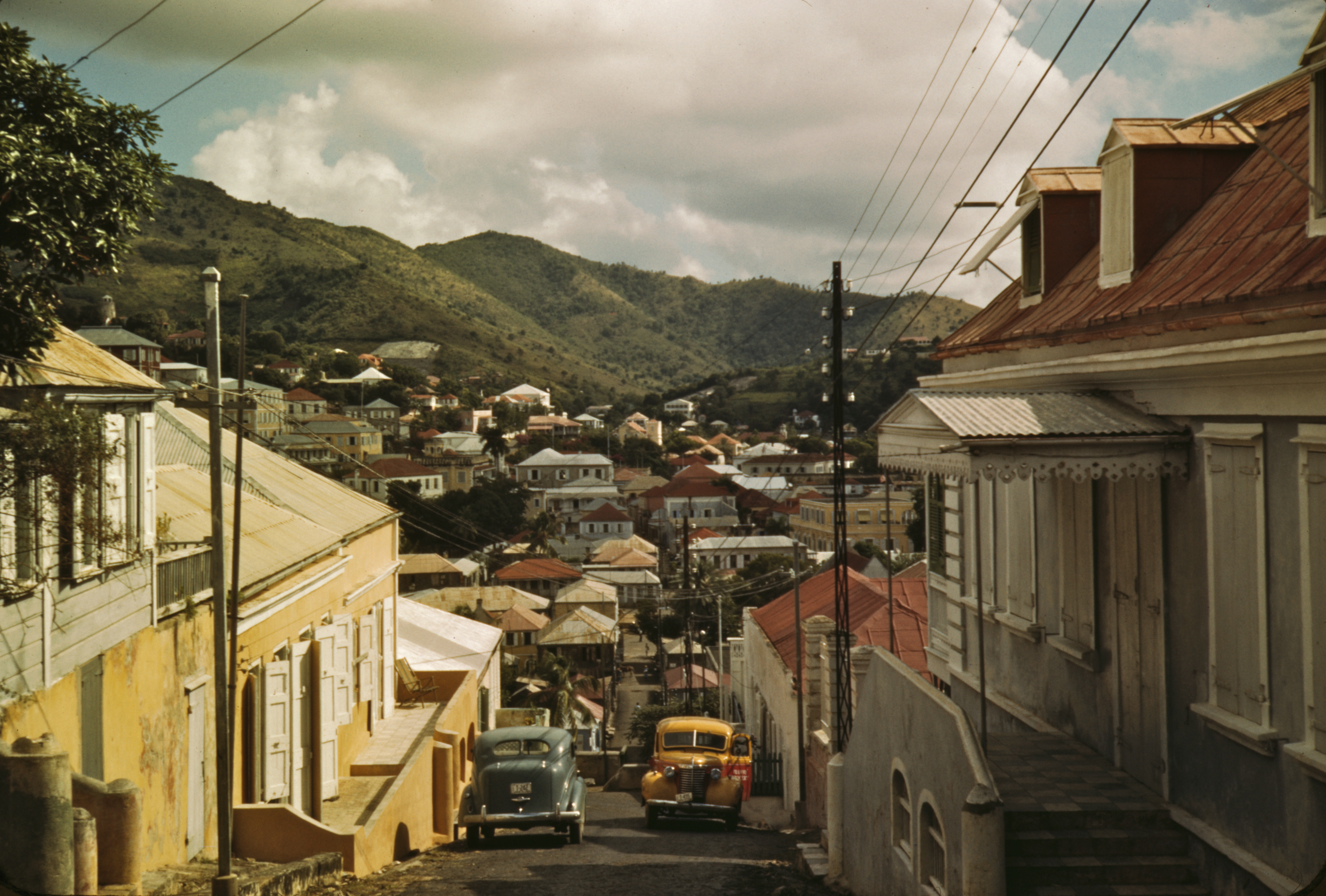
Bunker Hill (Commandant Gade), 1941

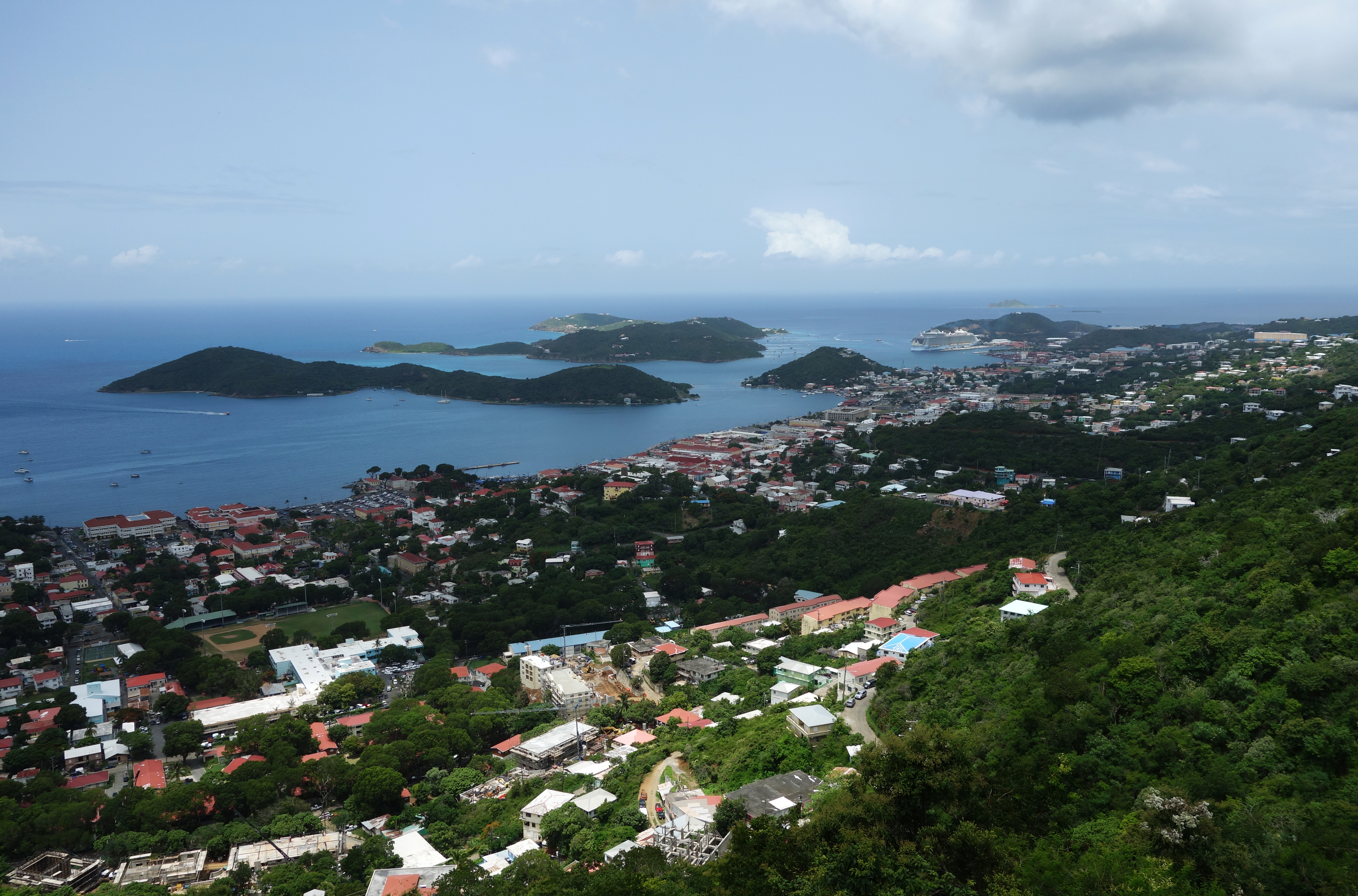
Overlooking town from Skyline Drive

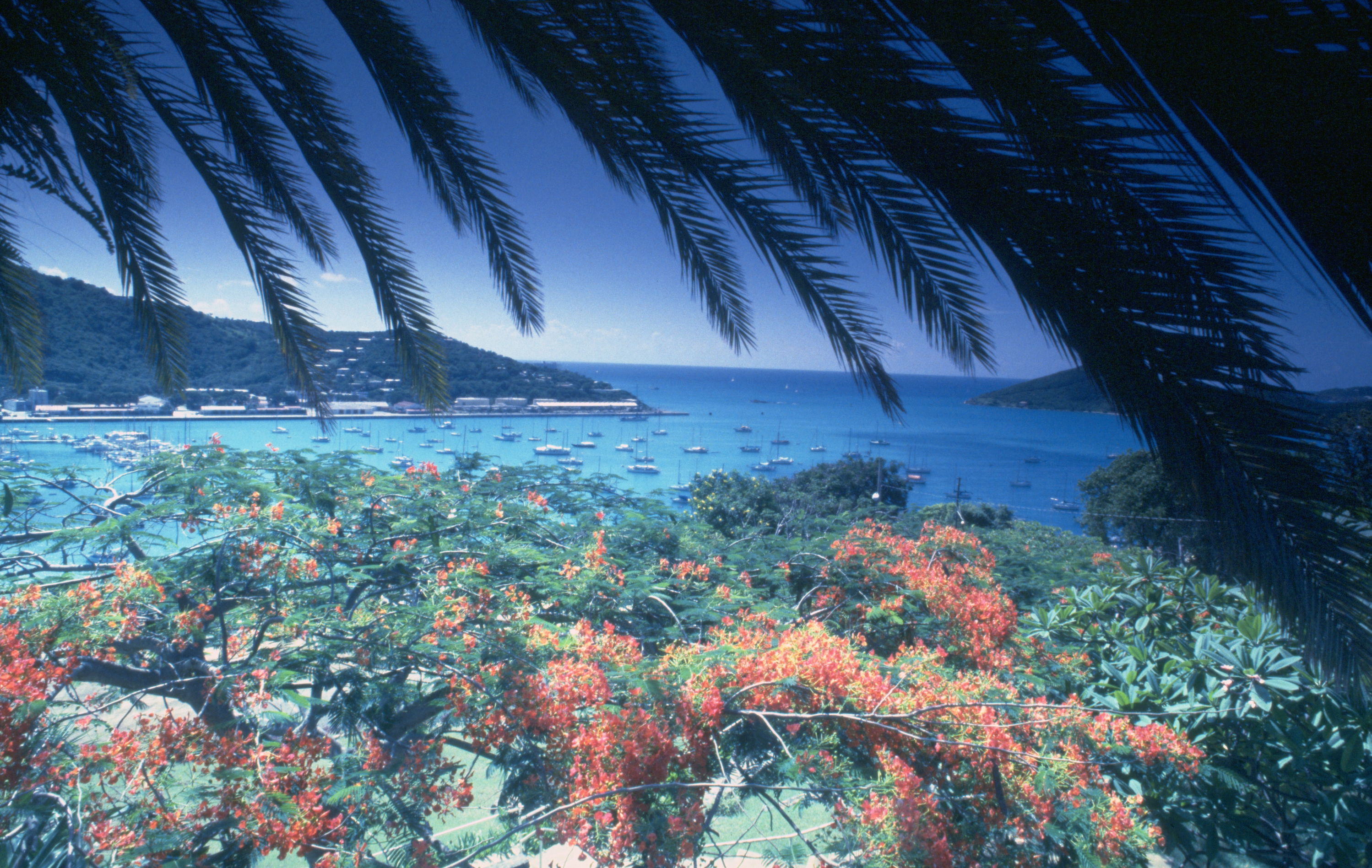
Harbor and Havensight view from Bluebeard's, 1980

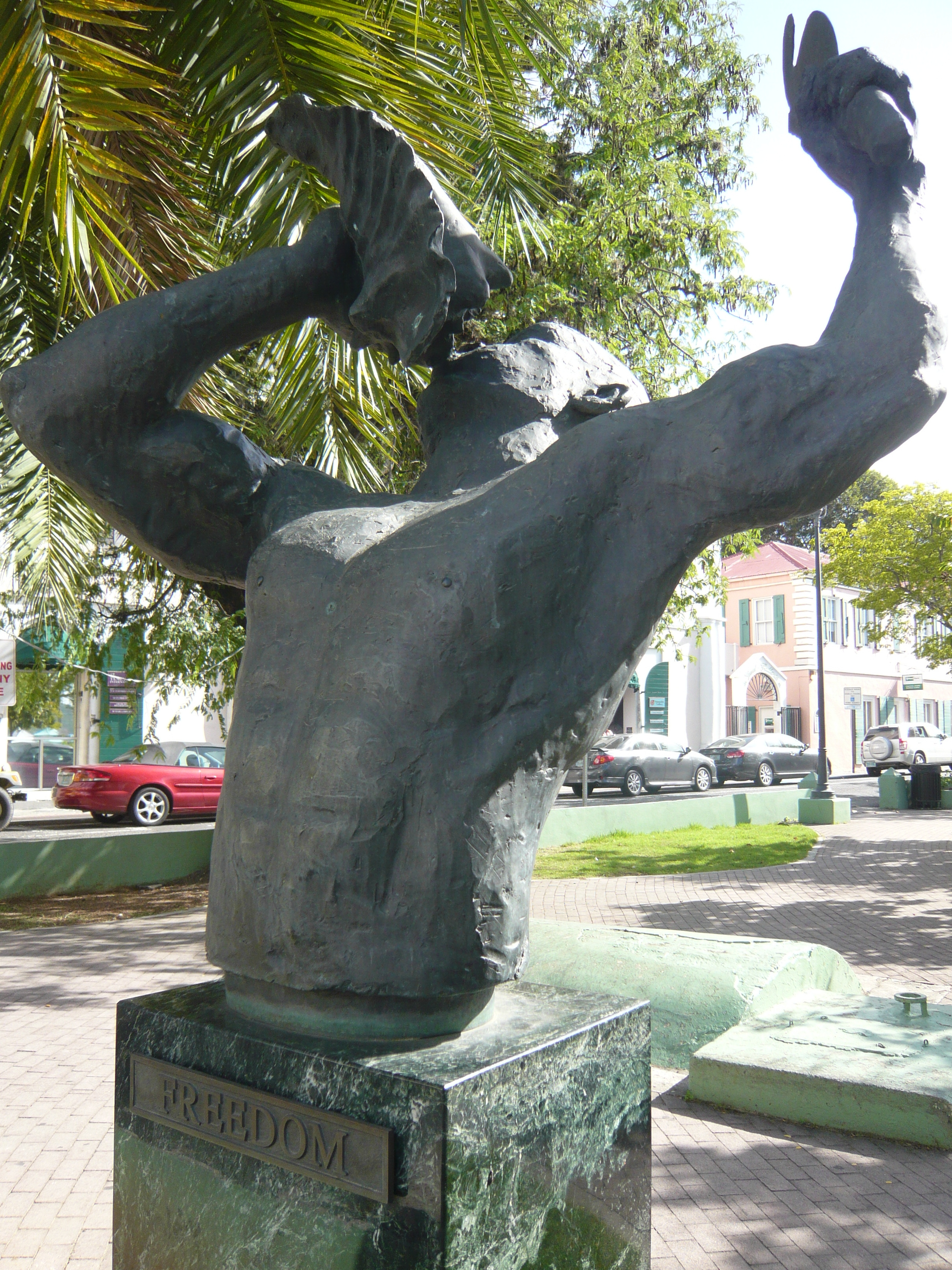
Conch Blower statue, Emancipation Garden

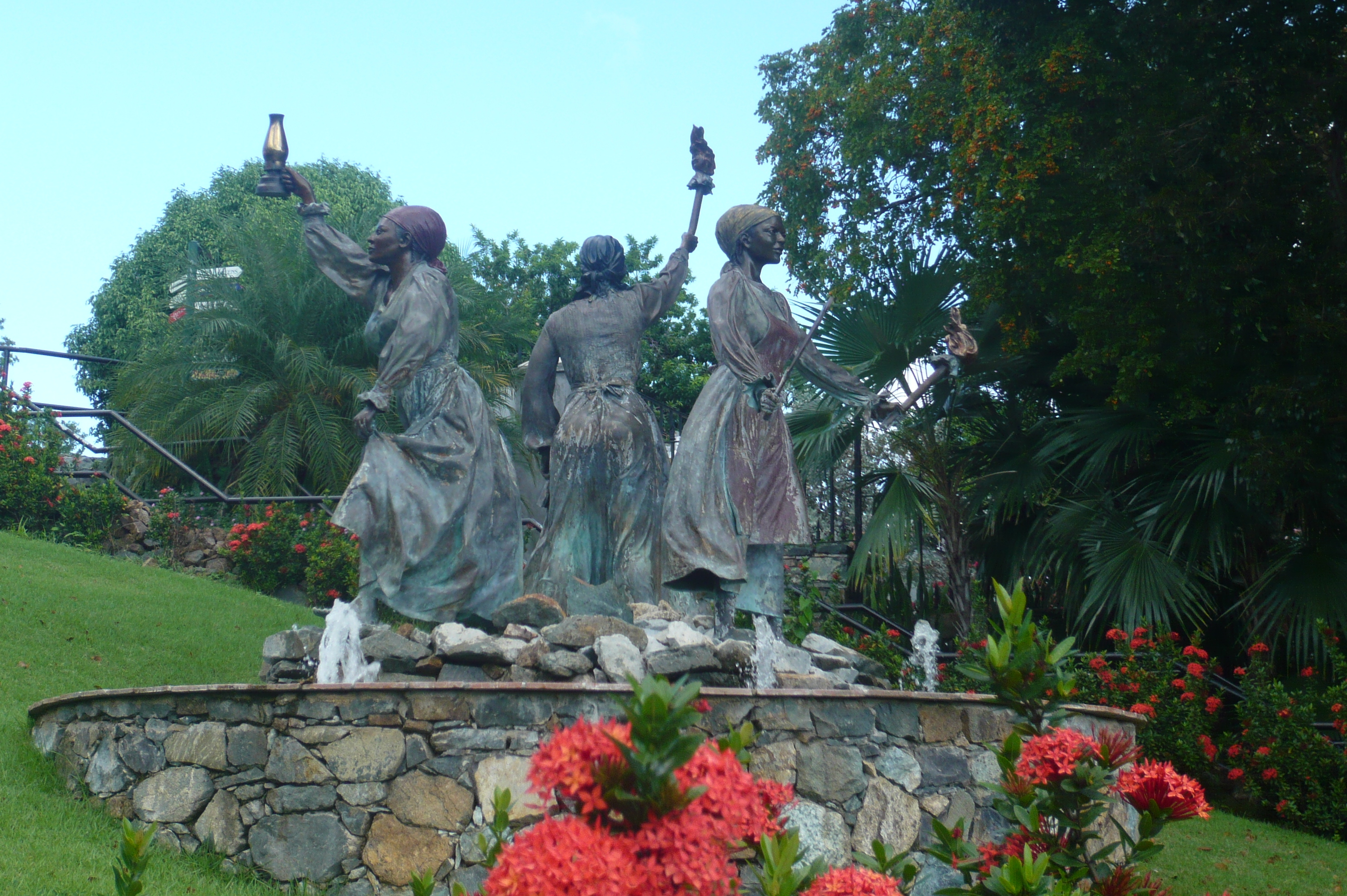
Three Queens Fountain, Blackbeard's Castle

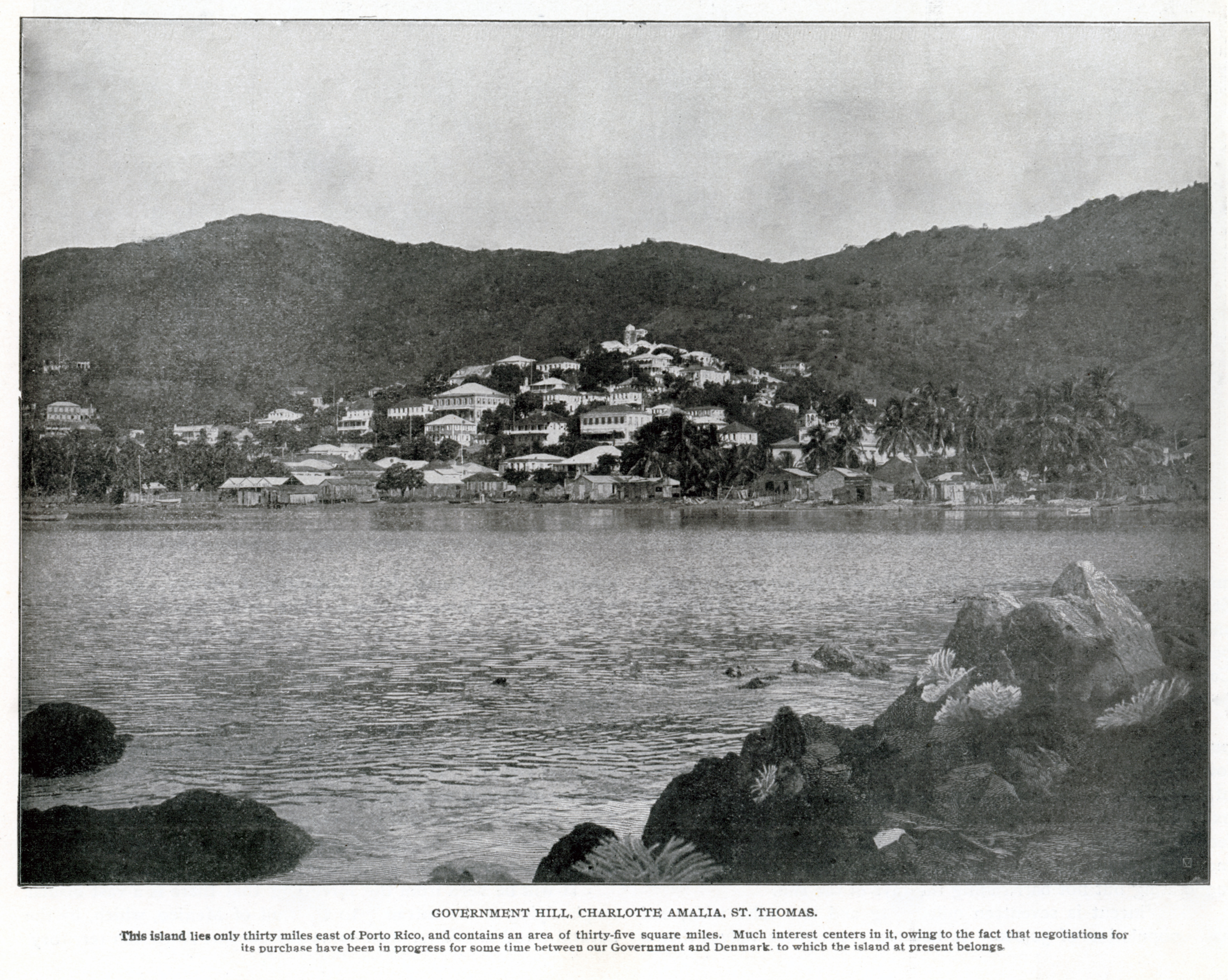
Charlotte Amalie, 1899
