= Las Caribelles =

Puerto Rican girl group

- Origin: San Juanl, Puerto Rico
- Genres: pop; salsa
- Years active: 1969–1979, 2023-current
- Labels: Hit; Borinquen

Las Caribelles are a Puerto Rican girl group. A pop music quartet, the group has been active since the late 1960s. Its members are sisters Emily and Norma Krasinski, as well as Frances Girau and Deborah Arús.

== Beginnings ==
Las Caribelles originated when four young women met at Conservatorio de Musica school in Puerto Rico; the women being Frances Girau, Mary Lyne Pagán and sisters Norma and Emily Krasinski. The group's manager was Fausto Curbelo, a well-known musical personality of the time in Puerto Rico.

== Success ==
Initially signed to the "Hit Parade" musical label, the group's first hit was a cover of a major Palito Ortega hit, "La Felicidad" ("Happiness"). The group thus became part of the Puerto Rican "nueva ola" ("New Wave") musical era, and, soon after, the Krasinski sisters as well as Pagán and Girau were cast to star on a television show named "El Show de Estrellas" ("Show of Stars") on Puerto Rican television, alongside Pijuan, Julio Angel, Eddie Miro and Nydia Caro.

Las Caribelles continued scoring hits in Puerto Rico's radio with songs such as "Un Hombre y Una Mujer" ("A Man and a Woman") "Crema Batida" ("Whipped Cream"), "El Eco de tu Voz" ("Your Voice's Echo") and "Los Tiempos de Antes" ("Old Times"). Eventually, Paquito Cordero signed them to star on a Telemundo, canal 2 television show named "Lo Mejor de la Semana" ("Best of the Week").

Beginning the decade of the 1970s, Las Caribelles began a concerts residence at two San Juan hotels, the San Juan Hotel and Casino and the Caribe Hilton Hotel. However, Norma Krasinski at that point wanted to develop a solo singing career, therefore, she left the group and it became a trio. As a trio, Las Caribelles also recorded a popular television commercial in Puerto Rico for Texaco, along with Tavin Pumarejo. Norma's singing career, meanwhile, took off but then fizzled out, and within a few years, she returned to Las Caribelles. The next album they recorded, the self-titled "Las Caribelles" in 1976, was recorded for the Borinquen Records label and it had hits such as "Matame" ("Kill Me"), "El Valle y el Volcán" ("The Valley and the Volcano"), "Secretaria", "Tu Volveras" ("You Will Return"), "Ding Dong" and "Vamos a Jugar al Amor" ("Let's Play Being in Love").

Towards the end of the 1970s, Las Caribelles recorded a Salsa song, "La Llorona" ("The Crying One"). The band also appeared at Luis Vigoreaux's television show, the weekly, Sundays show, "Dale que Dale en Domingo".

But, due to personal situations such as motherhood for the band's members, getting other types of jobs and others, the group decided to disband and the quartet had one final concert, for the time being, on 29 September 1979, at Cerromar Hotel in Dorado, Puerto Rico.

During the 1980s, member Norma Krasinski went on to become well-knwn as the children's television character, "Chicola", through her television show, "Chicola y la Ganga" ("Chicola and her Gang").

== Return ==
In 1997, Las Caribelles had a brief reunion when, during a homage to them by the city of Caguas, (titled "Nueva Ola Portorricencis"), the quartet performed a capela.,

In 2023, the group returned for a concert at the Centro de Bellas Artes de Caguas. The group had planned to return around 2020, but the COVID-19 pandemic prevented this from happening at that time.

== Discography ==
- Los tiempos de antes... (Hit Parade, 1967)
- Las Caribelles (Hit Parade, 1969)
- Las Caribelles (Borinquen, 1976)
