= Emancipation Park =

Emancipation Park may refer to:

- Emancipation Park (Houston), a park in Houston, Texas, United States
- Emancipation Park (Kingston, Jamaica), a park in Kingston, Jamaica
- Market Street Park, a park in Charlottesville, Virginia, United States formerly known as Emancipation Park
- Emancipation Park, part of the Charlotte Amalie Historic District, in Saint Thomas, U.S. Virgin Islands

== See also ==
- Emancipation Garden
