= Norma Krasinski =

Puerto Rican singer and actress

- Born: Saint Thomas, United States Virgin Islands
- Other name: Chicola
- Occupations: Singer, actress, television show host

Norma Krasinski (born on an 18 August in Saint Thomas, United States Virgin Islands) is a Puerto Rican-United States Virgin Islander singer and actress. She is best known (along with her sister Emily) as a member of the pop quartet Las Caribelles and as the television character "Chicola", from a television show named "Chicola y la Ganga" ("Chicola and her Gang"). She is also a screenwriter, producer, show host and songwriter.

== Show business career ==
Encouraged by her father, Krasinski studied at the Conservatory of Music of Puerto Rico, where she learned flute and singing. Later, she completed studies in choral conducting and worked as a solfège teacher. Krasinski, along with her sister Emily, was one of the two creators, and four original members, of girl group Las Caribelles. The group enjoyed great success in Puerto Rico during the late 1960s and the entire decade of the 1970s.

Las Caribelles were signed to the "Hit Parade" record label and their first hit was a cover of a Palito Ortega song, "La Felicidad" ("Happiness"). Krasinski soon looked to launch a solo singing career and she separated from Las Caribelles, but she returned later on.

While a soloist, Krasinski scored various musical hits on Puerto Rican radio, including "Mi Reino" ("My Kingdom") and "Ven a mi Lado" ("Come by my Side"). She was signed by Paquito Cordero (who had also signed Las Caribelles) and debuted as a show host alongside Juan Edenhofer, an Argentine journalist whom she would later marry and form a family with, on a television show named "Buenas Tardes, Mucho Gusto" ("Good Afternoon, Nice to Meet You!").

Soon, she would be the lead singer of a girl group named "Norma and the Masterpieces", in which she was joined by Dagmar Rivera, among others. This new group performed alongside Las Caribelles at a Luis Vigoreaux-hosted television show named "Dale que dale en Domingo". But Krasinski soon rejoined Las Caribelles, and the group scored one more hit, with the song "Matame" ("Kill Me"), before disbanding during 1979.

Early during the 1980s, Krasinski introduced, to the Puerto Rican public, her best-known acting role: the young girl "Chicola", on a children's television show named Chicola y la Ganga, which was transmitted on canal 4. The show, in which once again, she collaborated with Juan Edenhofer, moved during 1985 to canal 18 on Puerto Rican television.

In 1988, Krasinski combined her acting and singing when she released, as "Chicola", a children's musical album named "Chicola Rock". In 1997, one of her shows won the Service to Children Television Award.

As of 2023, she had reunited with Las Caribelles for a series of concerts and considered her character of "Chicola" to be on hiatus.

== Personal ==
She was married twice, including to show host Juan Edenhofer. She has two children. One of her children, Juan Edenhofer Jr., served as a member of the United States Marine Corps.

== See also ==
- List of Puerto Ricans
- Tere Marichal - "Maria Chuzema"
- Rosaura Andreu - "Titi Chagua"
