= Tavín Pumarejo =

Puerto Rican comedian and singer (1932–2016)

- Born: Octavio Ramos Pumarejo; October 12, 1932; Caguas, Puerto Rico
- Died: September 12, 2016 (aged 83); Río Piedras, Puerto Rico
- Occupations: comedian; singer
- Military career
- Allegiance: United States
- Branch: United States Army

Octavio Ramos Pumarejo (October 12, 1932 – September 12, 2016), known professionally as Tavín Pumarejo, was a Puerto Rican jíbaro singer and comedian. While better known for his work as a comedy actor on Puerto Rican television, Pumarejo released 16 albums of Puerto Rican music, with some of them becoming major hits in the island.

== Biography ==
Ramos Pumarejo was born on October 12, 1932, in Río Cañas, a barrio in Caguas, Puerto Rico, located closer to the mountain area of Caguas than from downtown San Juan. Having grown up in the mountains, Pumarejo identified himself with the Puerto Rican country people (known as jíbaro) more than with the metropolitan people who are always associated with San Juan. Graduated from Gautier Benítez High School.

Ramos Pumarejo who served in the United States Army started to work on Puerto Rican television when producer Paquito Cordero began producing a noon variety show called El Show de las 12 on Telemundo Puerto Rico, WKAQ-TV. To ensure that the public remembered him, he used his relatively uncommon maternal last name as part of his stage name. Like other popular Puerto Rican characters (José Miguel Agrelot's "Don Cholito", and Machuchal), Pumarejo donned a "pava" (a Puerto Rican peasant straw hat) for his television appearances. The pava became a staple in Pumarejo's life, as he began using it in almost every personal appearance and in interviews with newspapers and magazines. Pumarejo also earned the nickname of "El Hígado de Ganso" ("The Goose's Liver", or more accurately, foie gras).

Pumarejo was well known for his self-deprecating sense of humor and physical comedy style, which closely resembled that of a young Jerry Lewis. He was also a stutterer, something to which he constantly made humorous references in his live performances. For example, he claimed that a television comedy sketch featuring himself, Adrián García and Marcos Betancourt, all stammerers, would be four hours long.

Pumarejo was usually backed by his longtime musical combo, the Río Cañas Sound Machine (a spoof of the Miami Sound Machine, Harry Fraticelli was a member). In 1985, Pumarejo scored a Christmas music chart-topper, with his song "La Finquita" ("The Little Farm"), this time backed by the Conjunto Quisqueya, a very successful merengue band of Dominicans. It was a number one hit in Puerto Rican radio for about eight consecutive weeks, and the album was also one of the year's best selling Christmas album in Puerto Rico, along with Tony Croatto's, which contained the famous song, "Se Llama Jesús".

Outside of his musical career, Pumarejo was also a very successful medical sales representative for Novartis International AG, for over thirty years (he retired prior to his death). He once had Novartis sponsor his television slot in El Show de las 12, and joked that only Novartis' product Maalox could be an appropriate sponsor, since he was the most "maalox" (malo is Spanish for "bad") singer ever.

During the 1970s, Pumarejo also advertised Texaco on Puerto Rican television, alongside a popular Puerto Rican girl group of the time named Las Caribelles.

Tavin Pumarejo died September 12, 2016, at the San Juan Veterans Administration Medical Center in Río Piedras, Puerto Rico after a long illness. He was survived by his wife Vilma Viñas and two daughters Iris and Vilma. He was buried at Cementerio Borinquen Memorial in Caguas, Puerto Rico.

== See also ==
- List of Puerto Ricans
- Harry Fraticelli - who sang in Pumarejo's music group
