= Saint Thomas, U.S. Virgin Islands =

One of the main islands of the U.S. Virgin Islands

Saint Thomas
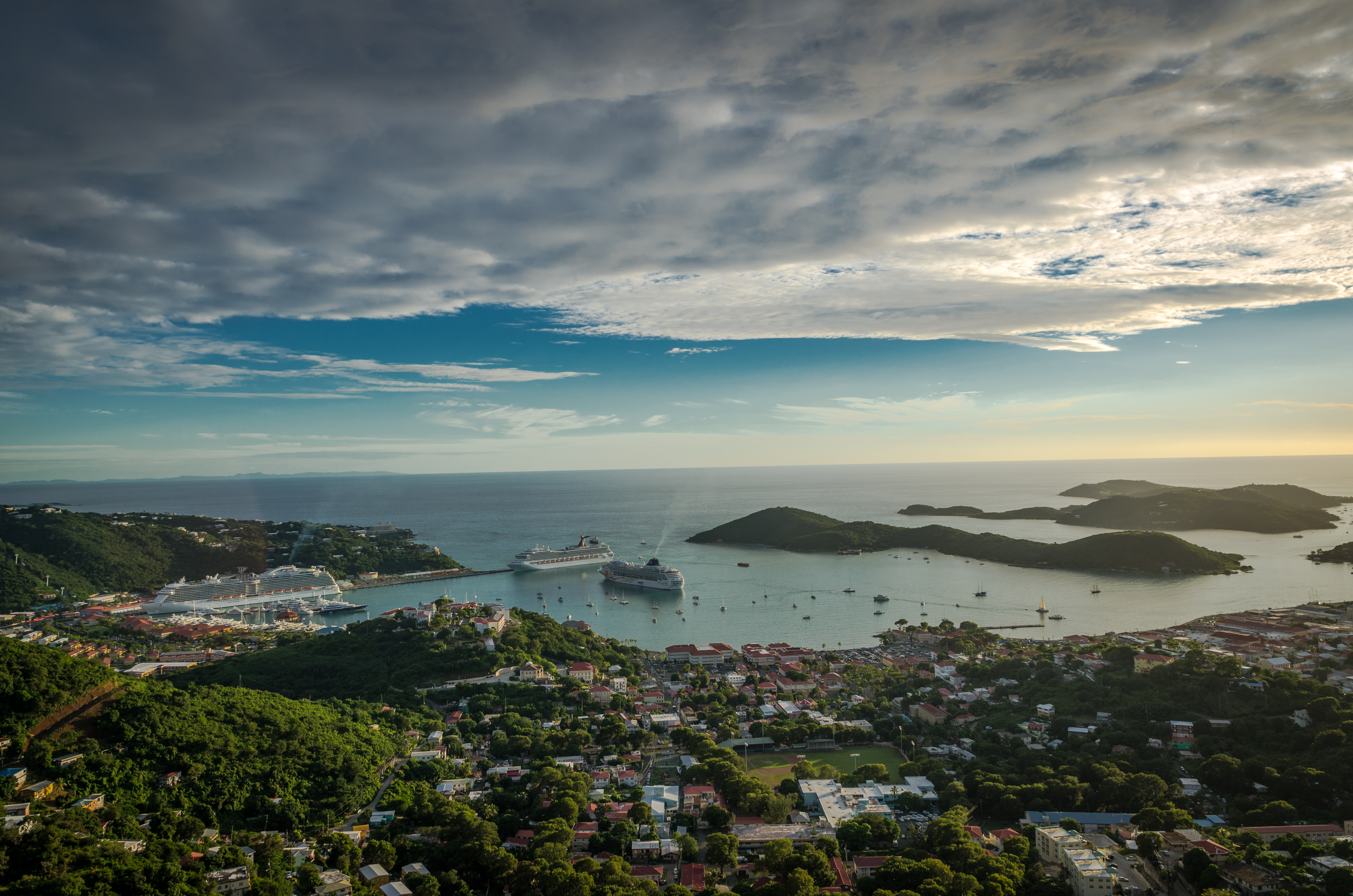
- Charlotte Amalie in Saint Thomas in December 2013

- Location within the U.S. Virgin Islands Location within Lesser Antilles Location within the Caribbean

Geography
- Location: Caribbean Sea
- Coordinates: 18°20′N 64°55′W
- Archipelago: U.S. Virgin Islands, Leeward Islands
- Area: 32 sq mi (83 km^{2})
- Highest elevation: 1,555 ft (474 m)
- Highest point: Crown Mountain

Administration
- United States
- Insular area: United States Virgin Islands
- Largest settlement: Charlotte Amalie (pop. 14,477)
- Administrator: Kevin Rodriguez

Demographics
- Population: 42,261 (2020 census)
- Pop. density: 509.2/km^{2} (1318.8/sq mi)

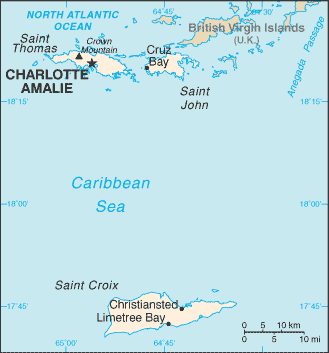
Map of U.S. Virgin Islands

Saint Thomas (Danish: Sankt Thomas, Spanish: Santo Tomás, French: Saint-Thomas) is one of the U.S. Virgin Islands in the Caribbean Sea, and a constituent district of the United States Virgin Islands (USVI), an unincorporated territory of the United States. Along with surrounding minor islands, it is one of three county equivalents in the USVI. Together with Saint John, it forms one of the districts of the USVI. The territorial capital and port of Charlotte Amalie is located on the island.

Of the three islands, St. Thomas is the second largest, with St. Croix being the largest, and St. John, the smallest. As of the 2010 census, the population of Saint Thomas was 51,634, about 48.5% of the total population of the United States Virgin Islands. Crown Mountain is the highest point in Saint Thomas and in the entire United States Virgin Islands. Hence, it is called "Rock City". The island has a land area of 32 square miles (83 km^{2}).

== History ==
=== Pre-colonial history ===
The island was originally settled around 1500 BC by the Ciboney people. Ciboney sites have been uncovered in Krum Bay. The island was later inhabited by the Arawaks and then the Caribs. Arawak sites have been uncovered in Magens Bay and Botany Bay, and Carib sites have been uncovered in Magens Bay.

=== Early European Exploration ===
Christopher Columbus sighted the island in 1493 on his second voyage to the New World. He landed on the island of Saint Croix and then made his way to the other islands nearby at the start of the Lesser Antilles, and named them "Santa Ursula y las Once Mil Virgenes", after the legend of Saint Ursula and her 11,000 virgins. It was later shortened to " Las Virgenes", which means, "The Virgins".

=== Danish colonial period ===
The Dutch West India Company established a post on Saint Thomas in 1657. The first congregation was the St. Thomas Reformed Church, which was established in 1660 and was associated with the Dutch Reformed Church.

Denmark-Norway's first attempt to settle the island in 1665 failed. However, the Danes did resettle St. Thomas in 1672, under the sponsorship of the Glueckstadt Co., later the Danish West India Company. The first slave ships arrived in 1673, and St. Thomas became a slave market. In 1685, the Danish leased part of the island to the Brandenburger Company, which was resold to the Danish in 1754, and was granted free port status in 1764.

The land was divided into plantations and sugarcane production became the primary economic activity. As a result, the economies of Saint Thomas and the neighboring islands of Saint John and Saint Croix became highly dependent on enslaved African labor and the African slave trade.

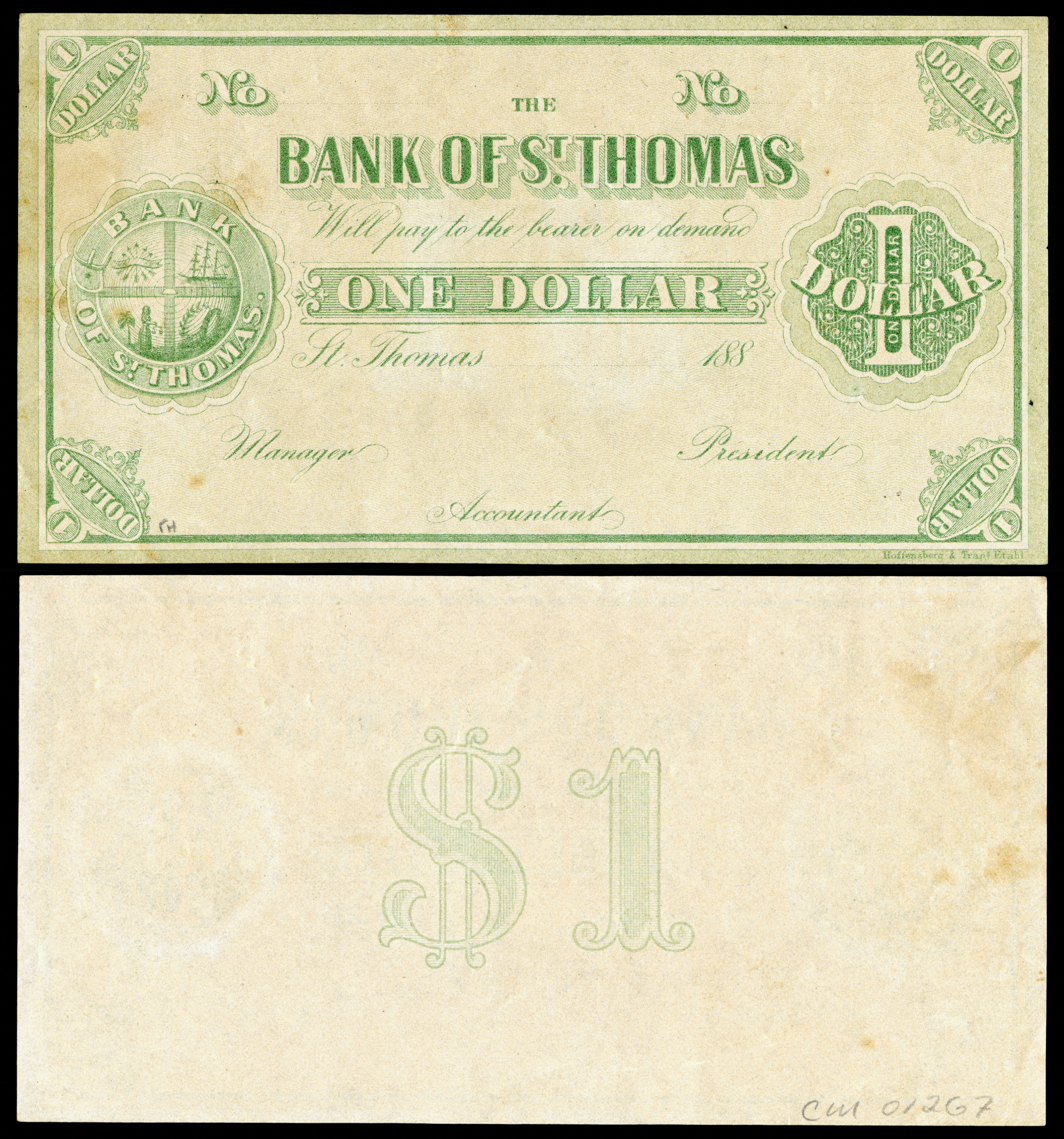
Danish West Indies, Sankt Thomas, 1 dollar (1889)

Saint Thomas's fine natural harbor became known as "Taphus" for the drinking establishments located nearby. ("Tap Hus" translates as "rum shop" or "tap house" referring to the drinking establishments.) In 1691, the primary settlement there was renamed Charlotte Amalia in honor of the wife of Denmark's King Christian V. It was later declared a free port by Frederick V. In December 1732, the first two of many Moravian Brethren missionaries came from Herrnhut, Saxony in present-day Germany to minister to them. Distrusted at first by the white masters, they lived among the slaves and soon won their confidence.

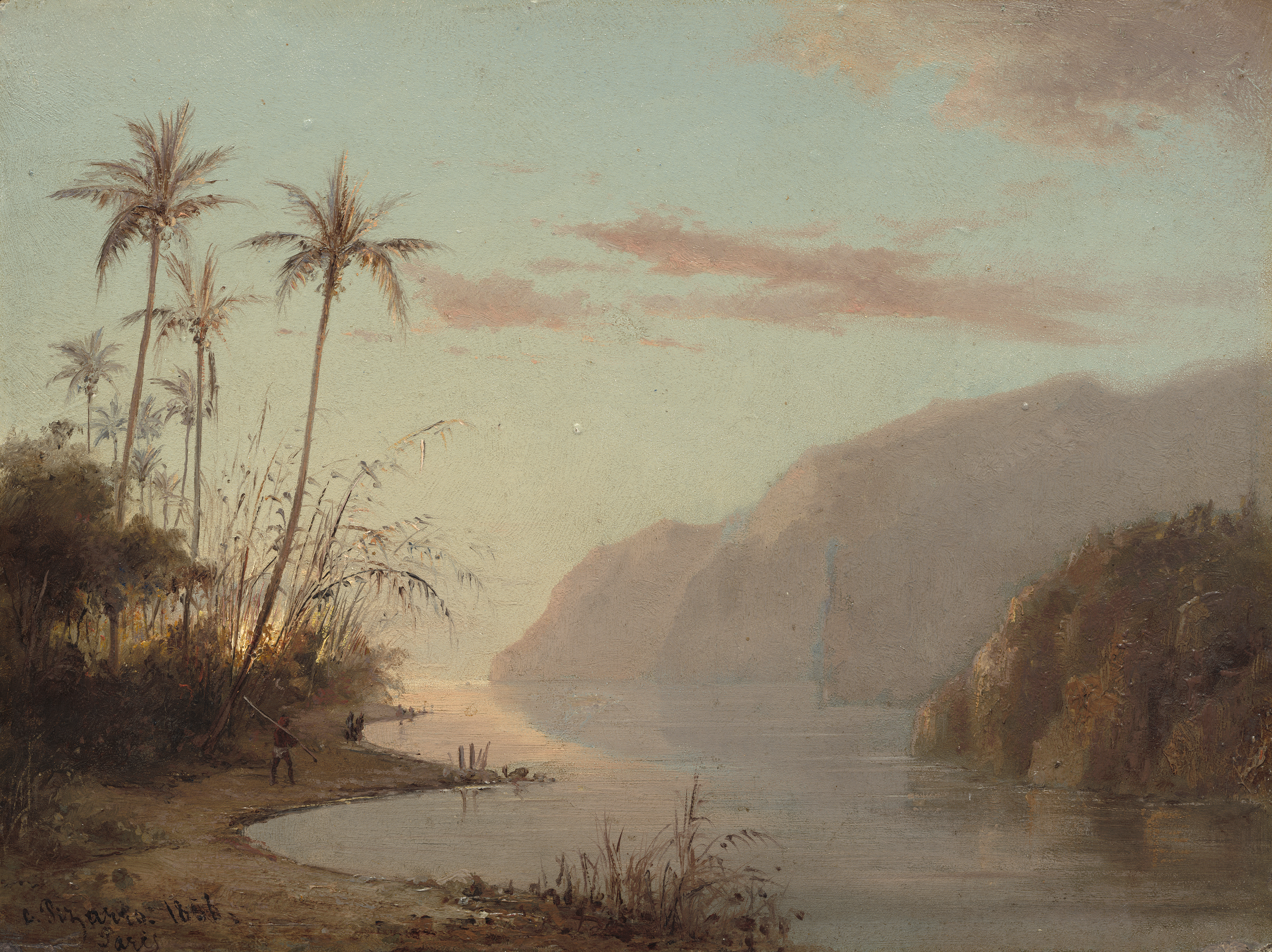
Camille Pissarro, A Creek in St. Thomas (Virgin Islands), 1856, National Gallery of Art. Pissarro was born on St. Thomas.

The first British invasion and occupation of the island occurred in 1801. The islands were returned to Denmark in 1802, under the terms of the Treaty of Amiens. Fire destroyed hundreds of homes in Charlotte Amalie in 1804. The second British occupation of the island occurred from 1807 to 1815, after the Invasion of the Danish West Indies (1807), during which they built Fort Cowell on Hassel Island.

While the sugar trade had brought prosperity to the island's free citizens, by the early 19th century Saint Thomas was in decline. The continued export of sugar was threatened by hurricanes, drought, and American competition. Following the Danish Revolution of 1848, slavery was abolished and the resulting rise in labor costs further weakened the position of Saint Thomas's sugar producers.

Given its harbors and fortifications, Saint Thomas still retained a strategic importance, and thus, in the 1860s, during the American Civil War and its aftermath, the United States government considered entering into a treaty with Denmark to buy the island and its neighbors from Denmark for $7.5 million. The Danish Landstinget agreed to the sale as did the inhabitants of the islands in a vote of 1,244 to 22. However, the proponents of the purchase in the United States failed to gain enough support to ratify the treaty.

=== Freedom of the press ===
In 1915, David Hamilton Jackson traveled to Denmark and convinced the King of Denmark to allow freedom of the press in Saint Thomas, Saint John, and Saint Croix. He began the first newspaper in the islands, known as The Herald. Jackson was the editor of The Herald, which had its office at 1B Kongens Gade in Christiansted. The newspaper's focus was civic and labor rights for local workers, and it published criticisms of the labor situation in the islands. After beginning The Herald, Jackson organized labor unions among the islanders for better working conditions. He was also instrumental in persuading the Danish to allow the US to purchase the islands of Saint Thomas, Saint John, and Saint Croix. The islands now have an annual celebration in November to honor the legacy of David Hamilton Jackson.

=== United States acquisition ===
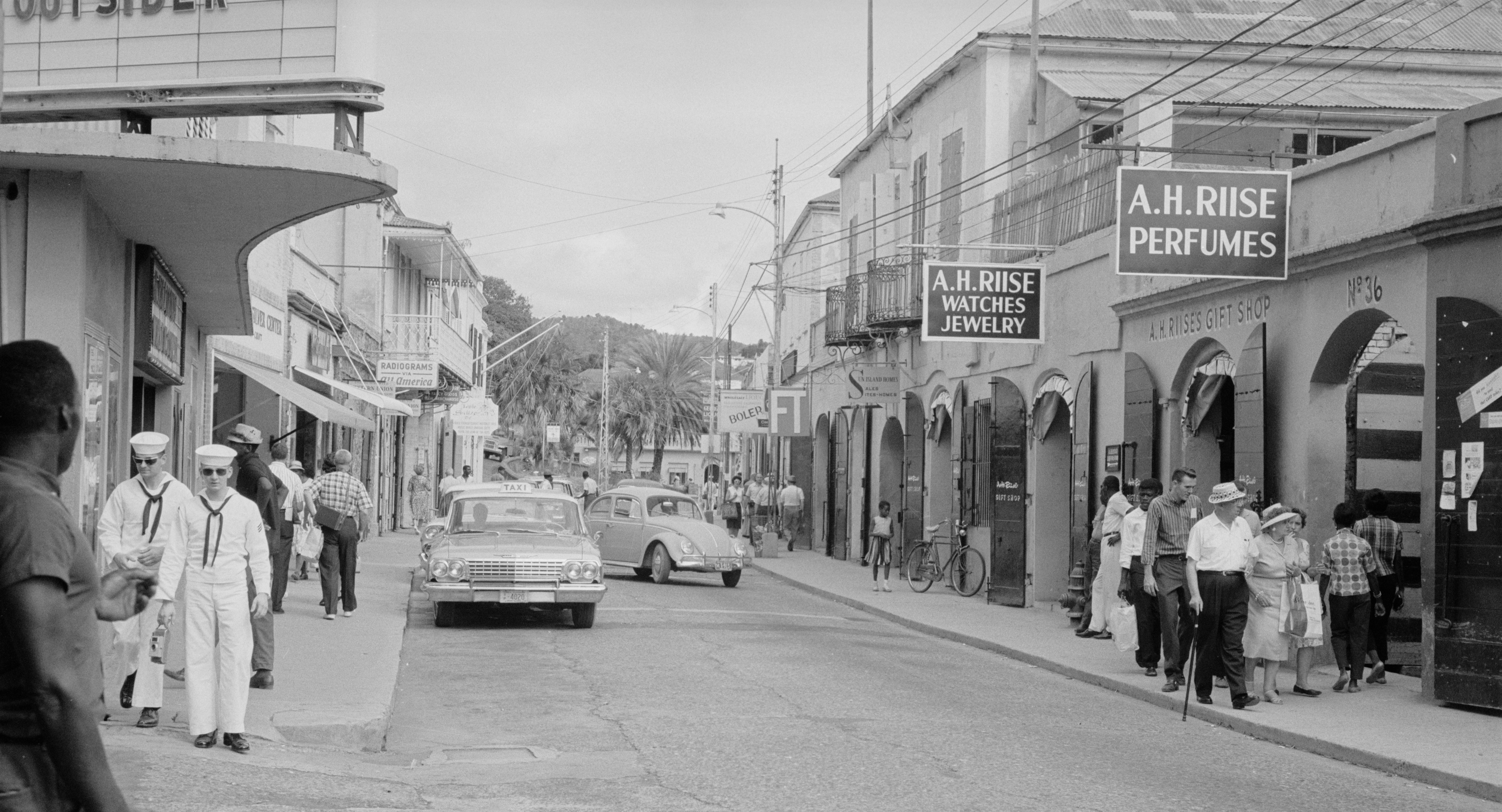
Locals, sailors, and tourists on a St. Thomas street in 1963

In 1917, Saint Thomas was purchased (along with Saint Croix and Saint John) by the United States for $25 million in gold ($628 million today), as part of a strategy to maintain control over the Caribbean and the Panama Canal during the First World War. The transfer occurred on March 31, 1917.

At the time of the U.S. purchase in 1917, the colony did not include Water Island; Water Island had been sold by Denmark to the East Asiatic Company, a private shipping company, in 1905. The company eventually sold the island to the United States in 1944, during the German occupation of Denmark. The federal government then used the island for military purposes until 1950 before finally transferring it to the territorial government in 1996.

The United States granted citizenship to residents of the Virgin Islands in 1927. The U.S. Department of the Interior took over administrative duties in 1931. American forces were based on the island during the Second World War. In 1954, passage of the U.S. Virgin Islands Organic Act officially granted territorial status to the three islands, allowing for the formation of a local senate. Full home rule was achieved in 1970.

The post-war era also saw the rise of tourism on the island. With relatively cheap air travel and the American embargo on Cuba, the numbers of visitors greatly increased. Despite natural disasters such as Hurricanes Hugo (1989), Hurricanes Luis and Marilyn (1995), and Hurricanes Irma and Maria (2017), hotels have been built from the West End to the East End. In recent years, Saint Thomas has become a busy cruise ship port and vacation venue.

== Geography ==
The island has a number of natural bays and harbors including Magens Bay, Great Bay, Jersey Bay, Long Bay, Fortuna Bay, and Hendrik Bay. Passenger ships dock and anchor in Long Bay and Crown Bay, near Charlotte Amalie. Ships dock at West Indian Company Dock and Austin Monsanto Dock. Red Hook is an unofficial "town" located on the East End subdistrict.

=== Climate ===
Saint Thomas has a tropical savanna climate (Aw according to the Köppen climate classification) with a drier season and a wetter season. The temperature is warm year-round, with January and February, the coolest months, having average highs of 29.5 °C (85.1 °F) and average lows of 22.4 °C (72.3 °F). August has the highest average high of 32.3 °C (90.1 °F), with July, August and September all having the highest average low at 25.6 °C (78.1 °F). The highest temperature ever recorded was 37.2 °C (99.0 °F) on August 4, 1994, and June 23, 1996, which is the highest temperature to have ever been recorded in the United States Virgin Islands. The lowest recorded temperature was 11 °C (52 °F) in November.

Saint Thomas receives 989 millimeters (38.9 in) of precipitation annually over 163.6 precipitation days. Autumn is the wettest time of year because of tropical cyclones. November is the wettest month, receiving 152 millimeters (6.0 in) of rain on average over 17.8 precipitation days, the most of any month. March is the driest month, receiving 27 millimeters (1.1 in) of rainfall over 8.1 precipitation days, the least of any month.

Climate data for Saint Thomas (Cyril E. King Airport), United States Virgin Islands, 1991–2020 normals, extremes 1953–present
Month	Jan	Feb	Mar	Apr	May	Jun	Jul	Aug	Sep	Oct	Nov	Dec	Year
Record high °F (°C)	93 (34)	93 (34)	96 (36)	96 (36)	97 (36)	99 (37)	98 (37)	99 (37)	98 (37)	97 (36)	95 (35)	92 (33)	99 (37)
Mean maximum °F (°C)	87.1 (30.6)	87.1 (30.6)	87.6 (30.9)	89.3 (31.8)	90.5 (32.5)	92.6 (33.7)	93.0 (33.9)	93.5 (34.2)	92.8 (33.8)	91.5 (33.1)	89.3 (31.8)	88.0 (31.1)	94.0 (34.4)
Mean daily maximum °F (°C)	84.1 (28.9)	84.3 (29.1)	84.5 (29.2)	85.7 (29.8)	87.2 (30.7)	88.9 (31.6)	89.7 (32.1)	89.8 (32.1)	89.2 (31.8)	88.4 (31.3)	86.6 (30.3)	85.2 (29.6)	87.0 (30.5)
Daily mean °F (°C)	78.8 (26.0)	78.9 (26.1)	79.1 (26.2)	80.6 (27.0)	82.3 (27.9)	84.1 (28.9)	84.5 (29.2)	84.7 (29.3)	84.7 (29.3)	83.3 (28.5)	81.6 (27.6)	80.1 (26.7)	81.9 (27.7)
Mean daily minimum °F (°C)	73.6 (23.1)	73.5 (23.1)	73.8 (23.2)	75.5 (24.2)	77.5 (25.3)	79.3 (26.3)	79.3 (26.3)	79.6 (26.4)	79.5 (26.4)	78.3 (25.7)	76.6 (24.8)	74.9 (23.8)	76.8 (24.9)
Mean minimum °F (°C)	68.5 (20.3)	69.8 (21.0)	69.2 (20.7)	71.0 (21.7)	72.7 (22.6)	74.5 (23.6)	74.2 (23.4)	74.6 (23.7)	74.2 (23.4)	72.8 (22.7)	71.0 (21.7)	70.4 (21.3)	66.7 (19.3)
Record low °F (°C)	63 (17)	62 (17)	60 (16)	62 (17)	66 (19)	67 (19)	66 (19)	65 (18)	64 (18)	64 (18)	61 (16)	62 (17)	60 (16)
Average precipitation inches (mm)	2.64 (67)	1.90 (48)	1.86 (47)	2.24 (57)	3.02 (77)	2.35 (60)	2.91 (74)	4.37 (111)	5.89 (150)	5.28 (134)	6.06 (154)	2.93 (74)	41.45 (1,053)
Average precipitation days (≥ 0.01 in)	15.0	13.5	10.7	10.6	11.9	10.9	14.8	15.8	15.2	17.3	18.5	17.4	171.6
Source 1: NOAA
Source 2: National Weather Service

== Subdivisions ==
Districts and subdistricts of the US Virgin Islands

Saint Thomas is divided into the following subdistricts (with population as per the 2020 U.S. census):

- Charlotte Amalie (pop. 14,477) Charlotte Amalie town (pop. 8,194)
- East End (pop. 7,502)
- Northside (pop. 8,889)
- Southside (pop. 4,112)
- Tutu (pop. 5,129)
- Water Island (pop. 164)
- West End (pop. 1,988)

The island is also divided into the traditional quarters: Charlotte Amalie (town), East End, Frenchman's Bay, Great Northside, Little Northside, New, Red Hook, Southside, and West End.

== Demographics ==
As of the 2020 U.S. census, the population of St. Thomas was 42,261.

=== Race and ethnicity ===
Race	Percentage
Black or African American	73.6%
White	12.6%
Asian	1.4%
American Indian and Alaska Native	0.3%
Native Hawaiian and Other Pacific Islander	0.0%
Some other race	3.0%
Two or more races	9.1%

Hispanic or Latino	Percentage
Of Hispanic or Latino origin (of any race)	13.7%
Not Hispanic or Latino	86.3%

==== Historical ethnic communities ====
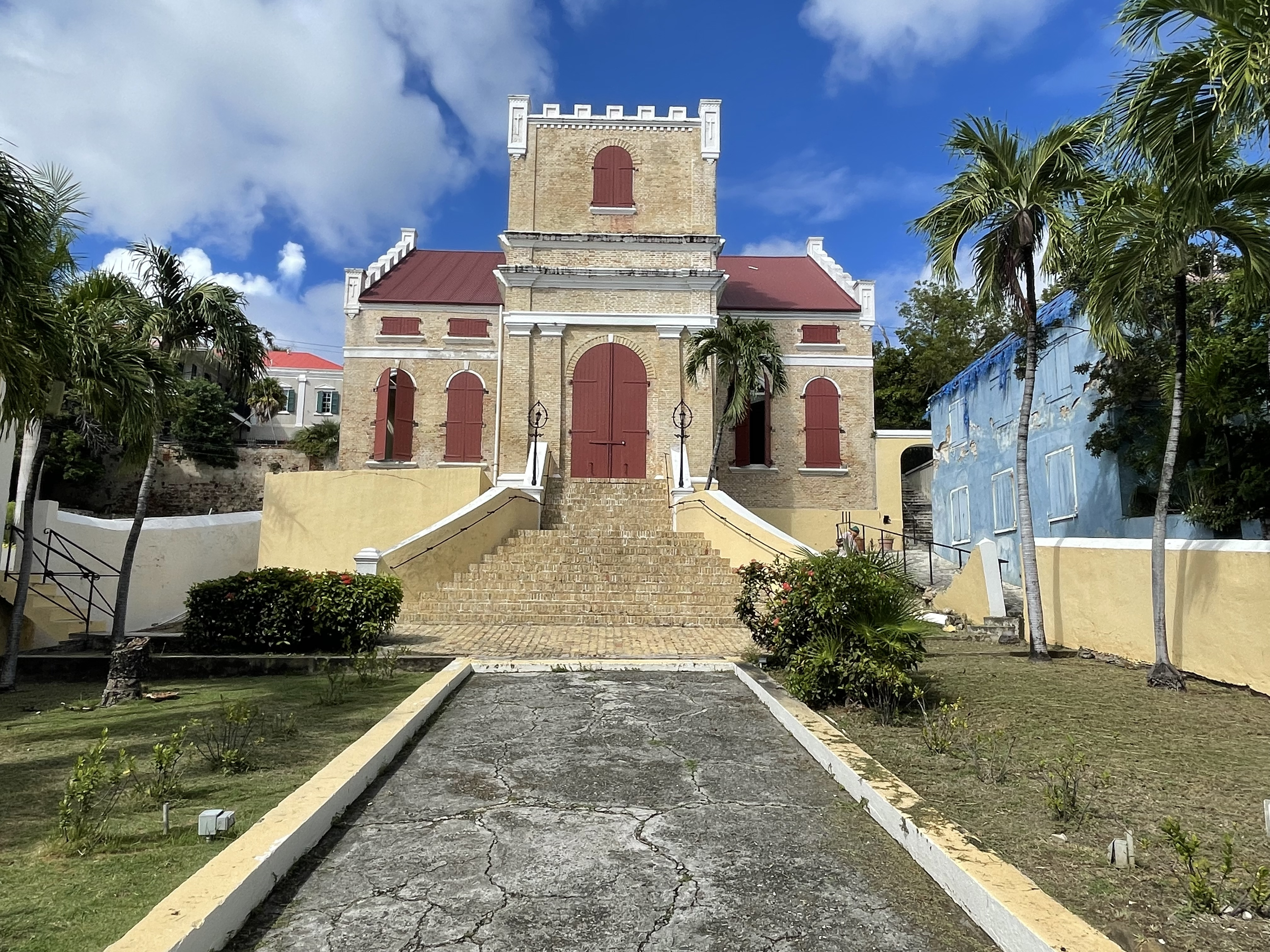
US Virgin Islands, Frederick Evangelical Lutheran Church was founded in 1666. The present structure was completed in 1793.

From 1796 a small Jewish community developed in Charlotte Amalie. It established the Beracha Veshalom Vegmiluth Hasadim, the second oldest synagogue in the United States.

During the late nineteenth and early twentieth centuries a group of French Catholic immigrants known as the Chacas came to St. Thomas from the St. Barthélemy islands to the east, forming one community of fishermen and one of farmers.

=== Language ===
Language spoken at home (by population 5 years and over in households)
Language	Number	Percentage
English only	27,959	70.9%
Spanish	5,168	13.1%
French, Haitian Creole, or Cajun	4635	11.7%
Other languages	1686	4.3%

== Transportation ==
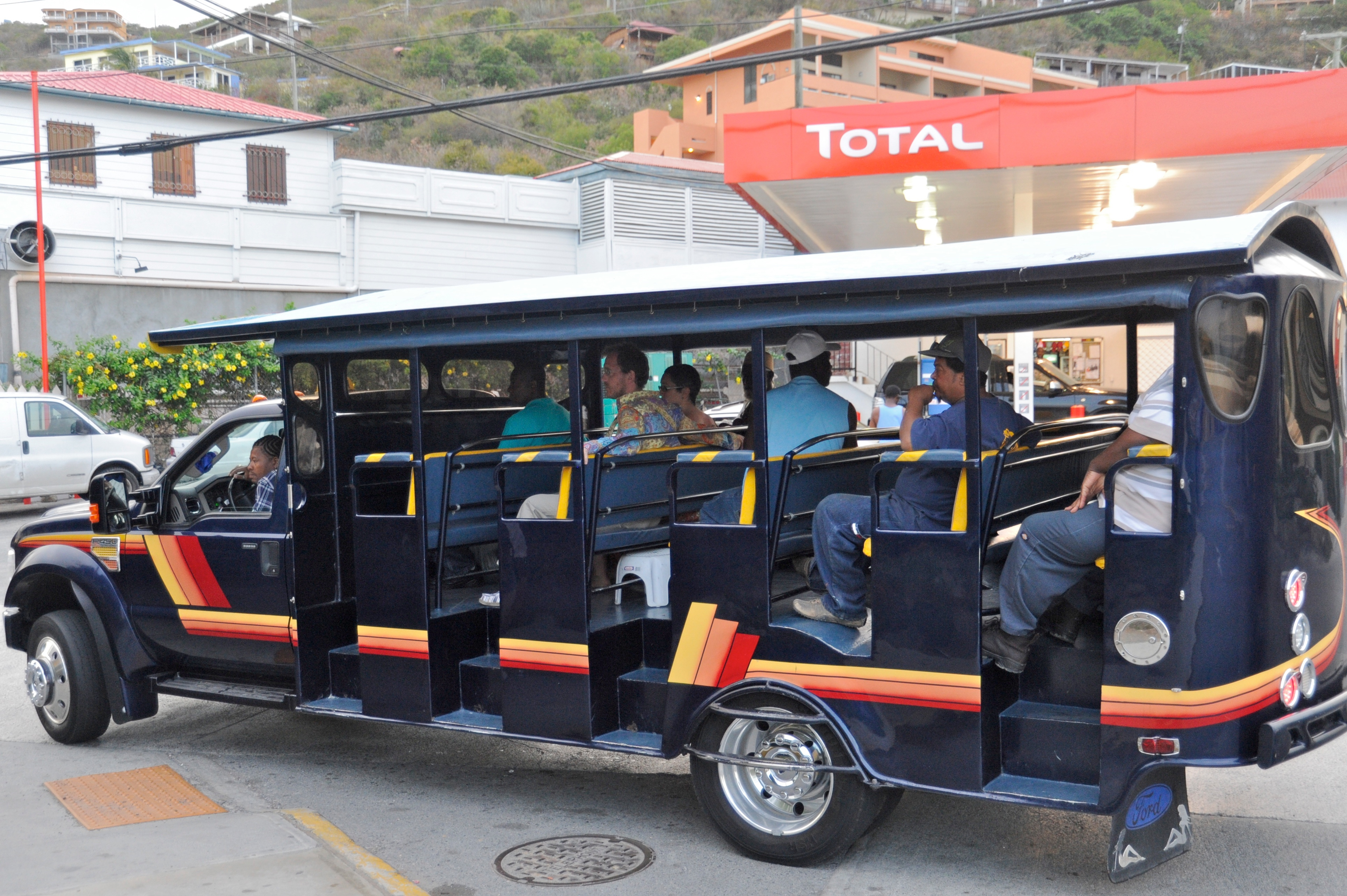
Cab at Red Hook

The island is serviced by the Cyril E. King International Airport. Passenger and limited car-ferry services to neighboring islands such as Water Island, Saint John, Saint Croix, and the British Virgin Islands run regularly out of the Red Hook Terminal, Charlotte Amalie Terminal, and Crown Bay Marina.

There are safaris, which are open air taxis, mounted onto the back of a pickup truck. On St. John the fare is 8 to 38 USD per person one way.

Regular taxis operate with about the same fares as safaris (as an example a 5 minute taxi ride in Red Hook was 9 USD per person as of April 2026). There is some room for negotiation based on availablility and haggling skills.

The Virgin Islands also has a public transit system called the Virgin Islands Transit, or VITRAN, which services a fare of $2. These buses are discounted for both senior citizens and students with valid ID's.

The United States Virgin Islands is the only place under United States jurisdiction where the rule of the road is to drive on the left. This was inherited from what was the then-current Danish practice at the time of the American acquisition in 1917. However, because the islands are a U.S. territory, most cars are imported from the mainland United States and therefore the steering column is located on the left side of the vehicle.

The island has many regular private taxis from compact size to large vans, as well as open-air, covered trucks called "safaris" with bench seats.

== Education ==
St. Thomas-St. John School District operates public schools.

Elementary Schools:

- Jane E Tuitt Elementary School
- Joseph Gomez Elementary School
- Joseph Sibilly Elementary School
- Julius E. Sprauve School (located on Saint John)
- Ulla F. Muller Elementary School
- Yvonne R. Milliner-Bowsky Elementary School

K-8 Schools:

Lockhart K-8 School

Junior High Schools:

- Addelita Cancryn Junior High School
- Bertha C. Boschulte Middle School
- Edith L. Williams Alternative Academy

High Schools

- Charlotte Amalie High School
- Ivanna Eudora Kean High School

There are also several private and parochial schools in the St. Thomas-St.John School District:

Private schools:

- Antilles School
- Virgin Islands Montessori School & Peter Gruber International Academy

Parochial schools:

- All Saints Cathedral School
- Sts. Peter & Paul Catholic School
- Calvary Christian Academy
- Church of God Academy
- Memorial Moravian School
- Seventh Day Adventist School
- Wesleyan Academy Bible School

There is one University in the U.S. Virgin Islands (HBCU) with two campuses, one in each district:

- University of the Virgin Islands
  - Orville E. Kean Campus on Saint Thomas
  - Albert A. Sheen Campus on Saint Croix

== Notable people ==
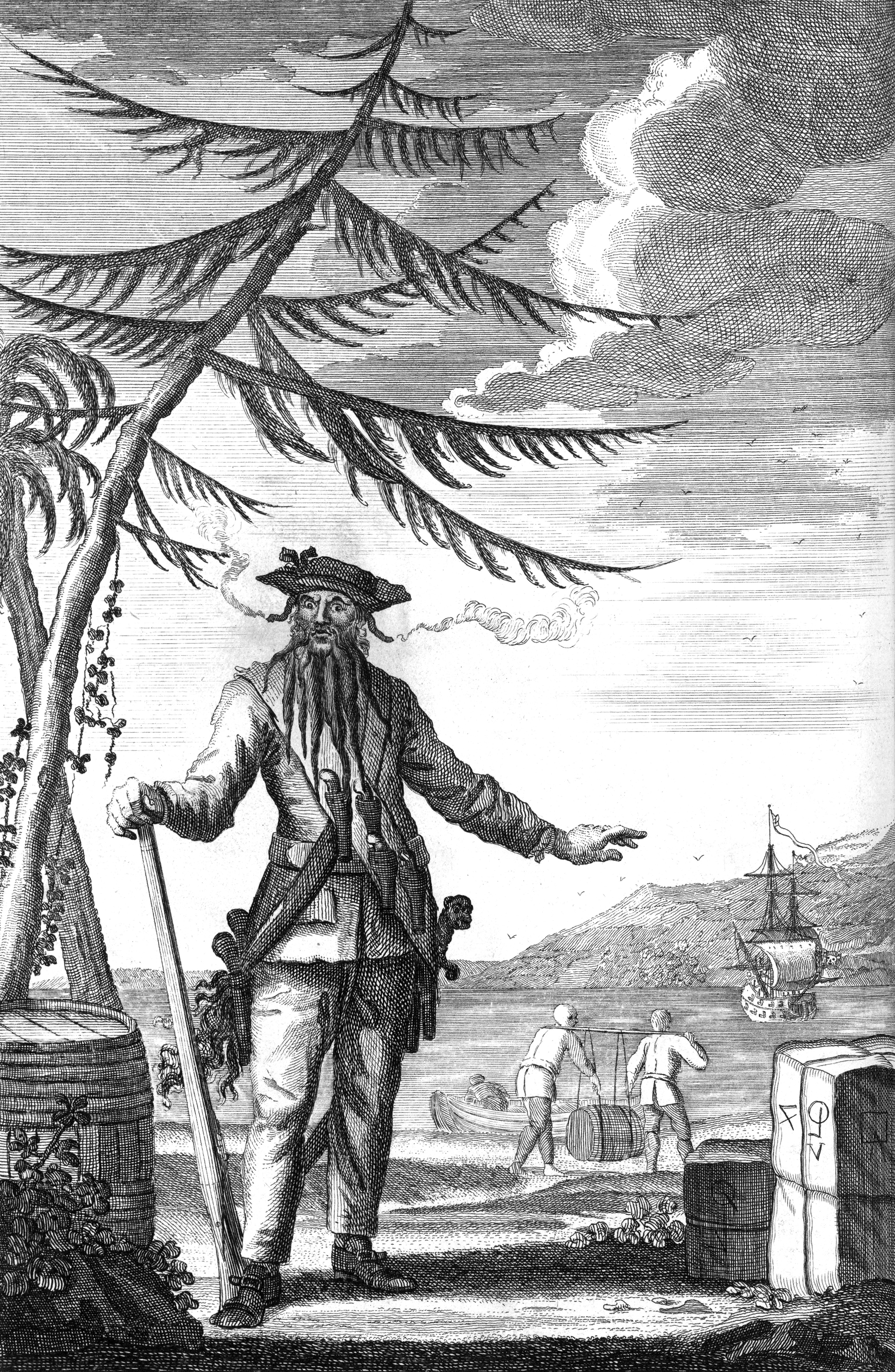
Blackbeard

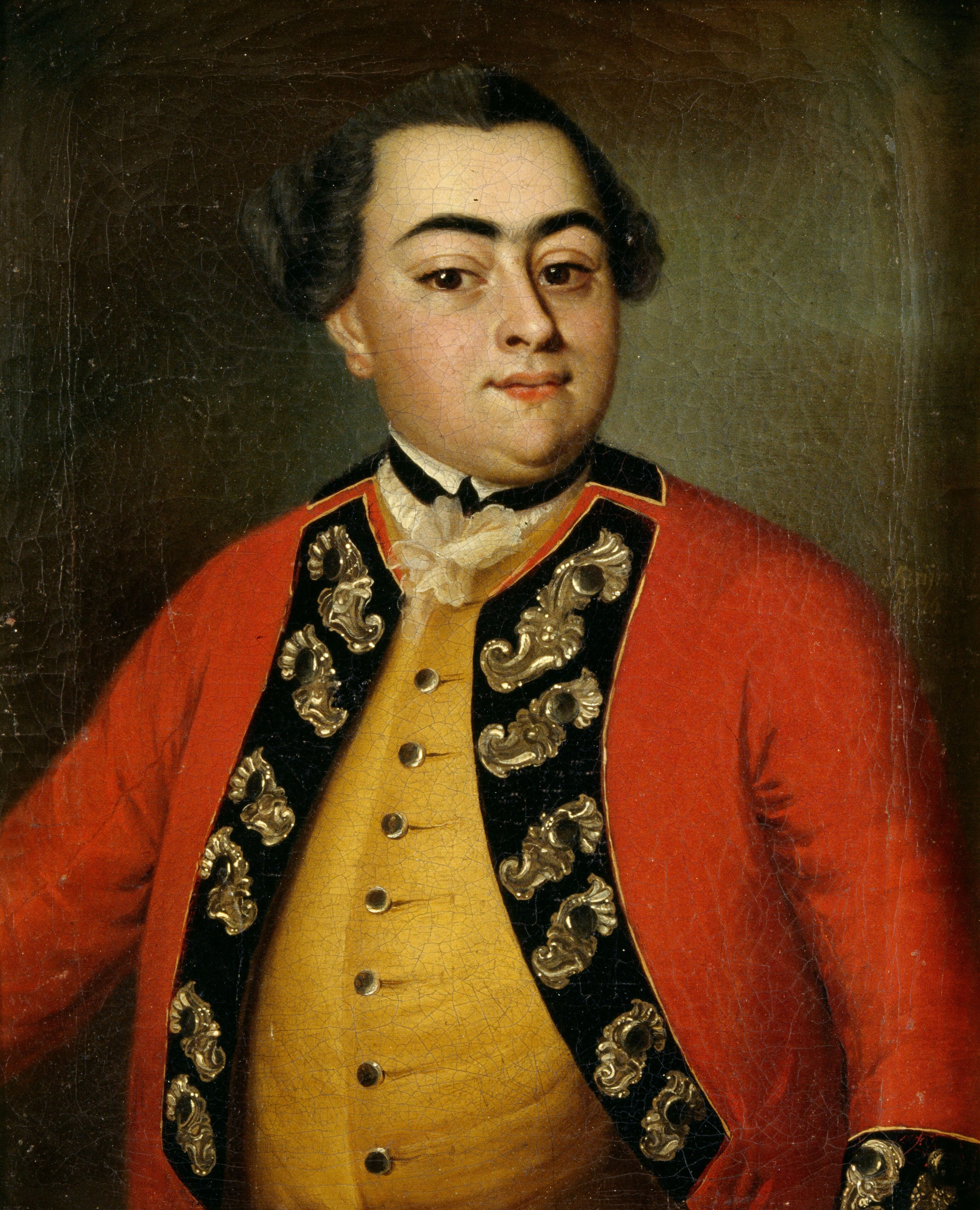
Thomas de Malleville

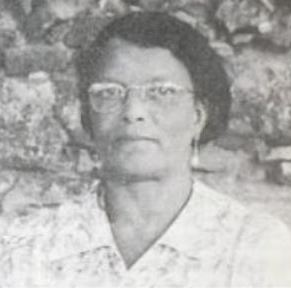
Bertha C. Boschulte

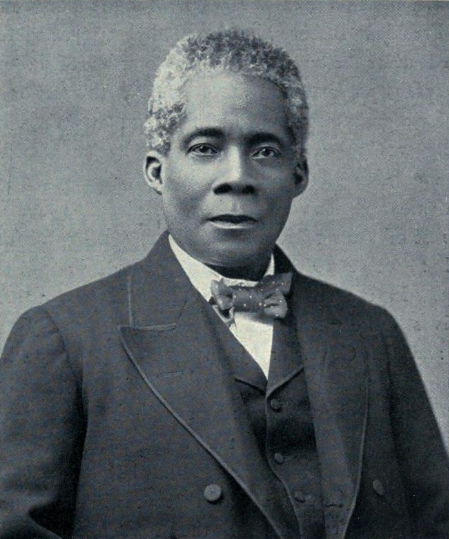
Edward Wilmot Blyden, 1906

- Gabriel Milan (c. 1631–1689), governor from 1684−1686
- Edward Teach (c. 1680–1718), known as Blackbeard, a pirate and privateer; may have been given a letter of marque from St. Thomas after being pardoned for pirating
- Jean Hamlin − late 17th-century French buccaneer
- Norma Krasinski - Puerto Rican-Virgin Islander singer and actress
- Johan Lorentz Castenschiold (1705–1745), a Danish nobleman, landowner and planter
- Thomas de Malleville (1739–1798), a Creole-Danish military officer and colonial administrator
- Denmark Vesey (c. 1767–1822), leader of planned slave uprising in Charleston, South Carolina
- Joachim Melchior Magens (1775–1845), a Danish jurist and public prosecutor
- Peter von Scholten (1784–1854), governor general from 1827 to 1848.
- Hermann Treschow Gartner (1785–1827), a Danish surgeon and anatomist, discovered Gartner's duct
- Lewin Jürgen Rohde (1786–1857), a Danish naval officer, harbour master, cartographer and acting governor
- Antonio López de Santa Anna (1794–1876), soldier and President of Mexico
- Ulrik Anton Motzfeldt (1807–1865), a Norwegian jurist and politician
- David Levy Yulee (1810–1886), politician, the first member of the United States Senate to have been a practicing Jew
- Charles Joseph Sainte-Claire Deville (1814–1876), French geologist
- Henri Étienne Sainte-Claire Deville (1818–1881), French chemist
- Camille Pissarro (1830–1903), key member of the French Impressionist group of painters
- Edward Wilmot Blyden (1832–1912), ambassador, an Igbo in Diaspora; credited as laying the foundation of West African nationalism and Pan-Africanism
- Dora Richards Miller (1842–1914), author and educator
- Morris Simmonds (1855–1925), German physician, pathologist, described Simmonds syndrome
- Urania P. Cummings (1889–1978), painter and folk artist
- Alton Augustus Adams (1889–1987), the first African-American band master for the United States Navy
- Jean Joseph Sibilly (1889–1997), farmer and restaurant owner
- J. Raymond Jones (1899–1991), political activist in New York City
- John Patrick (1905–1995), screenwriter and Tony Award & Pulitzer Prize-winning playwright
- Bertha C. Boschulte (1906–2004), an American educator, women's rights activist, statistician and politician
- Ralph Moses Paiewonsky (1907–1991), governor from 1961 to 1969
- Terence Todman (1926–2014), ambassador in the US Diplomatic Service
- Roy Lester Schneider (1939–2022), physician and governor, from 1995 to 1999
- Ademola Olugebefola (born 1941), artist, musician and educator
- Catherine Alicia Georges (born 1944), nurse
- LaVerne E. Ragster (born 1951), marine biologist and academic administrator
- Kelsey Grammer (born 1955), actor, director, and producer born in Saint Thomas
- John de Jongh Jr. (born 1957), 7th Governor of the United States Virgin Islands
- Jean Toussaint (born 1960), jazz tenor and soprano saxophonist
- Christine Jowers (born c. 1960), choreographer, producer and dance critic
- Barbara A. Petersen, administrator for Saint Thomas and Water Island
- Vanessa Daou (born 1967), singer-songwriter, dancer, writer, poet
- Karrine Steffans (born 1978), former hip-hop music video performer, actress, author of Confessions of A Video Vixen
- Tiphanie Yanique (born 1978), fiction writer, poet and essayist
- Rashawn Ross (born 1979), trumpeter who tours with Dave Matthews Band
- Janelle James (born 1979), comedian and actress
- Hannah Jeter (born 1990), Sports Illustrated swimsuit cover model and wife of Derek Jeter of the New York Yankees

=== Sport ===
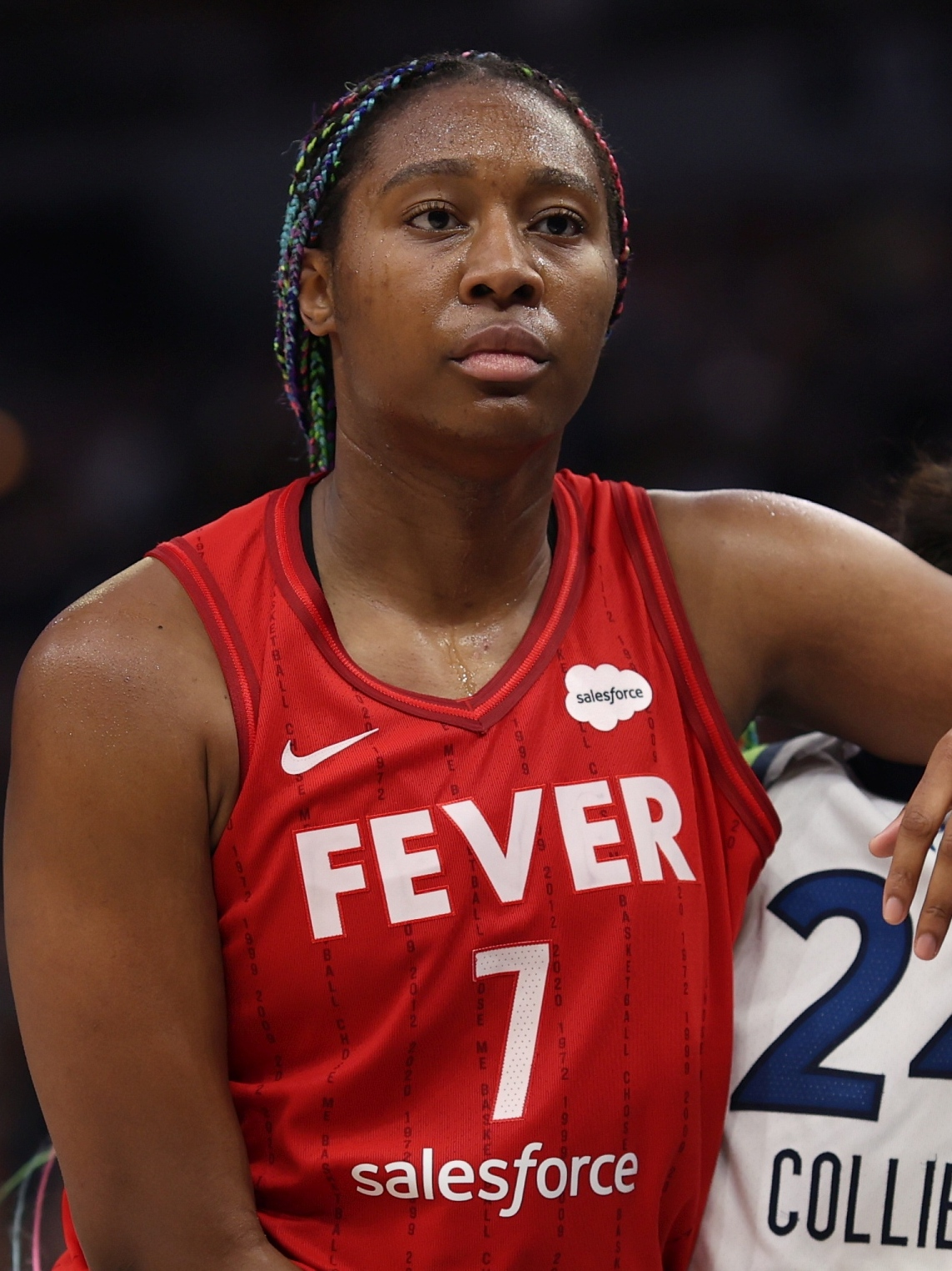
Aliyah Boston, 2023

- Emile Griffith (1938–2013), boxer, world champion in the Welterweight and Middleweight divisions
- Al McBean (1938–2024), Major League Baseball player
- Elrod Hendricks (1940–2005), Major League Baseball player
- Pamela Balash-Webber (1953–2020), diving instructor
- Julian Jackson (born 1960), boxer born in Saint Thomas
- Calvin Pickering (born 1976), Major League Baseball player
- Jeff Faulkner (born 1964), National Football League player
- Callix Crabbe (born 1983), Major League Baseball player
- Abdul Hodge (born 1983), National Football League player
- Jabari Blash (born 1989), baseball player
- Daryl Homer (born 1990), saber fencer, silver medallist at the 2016 Olympic Games
- Akeel Morris (born 1992), baseball player
- Nicolas Claxton (born 1999), NBA player, center for the Brooklyn Nets
- Aliyah Boston (born 2001), WNBA player, power forward for the Indiana Fever

== In popular culture ==
=== Music ===
"St. Thomas" is among the most recognisable instrumentals in the repertoire of American jazz tenor saxophonist Sonny Rollins based on a traditional calypso sung to him by his mother, Valborg Solomon Rollins, who was born on Saint Thomas.

The traditional music of the Virgin Islands is called quelbe, also known as scratch or fungi. This music style is performed using instruments made from gourds and everyday objects, with bands typically incorporating banjos, conga drums, washboards, triangles, saxophones, and flutes.

In addition to quelbe, other music styles such as calypso, reggae, soca, and hip hop are also popular among the islands.

=== Dances ===
Quadrille is the traditional folk dance of the Virgin Islands, and St. Thomas' variation is called the "Flat German Quadrille". The origin of this dance was in France in the 1700s. This dance was brought to the islands during their history under various nations, including France and England. Initially a source of entertainment on sugar plantations, it has evolved into a cultural emblem, primarily reserved for local holidays celebrating the Virgin Islands heritage. Originally performed by two couples, it has since expanded to involve four couples arranged in a square formation.

=== Cultural clothing ===
The most notable clothing in St. Thomas, and the rest of the Virgin Islands is called the traditional V.I. Madras. Madras is a striped pattern that can be found on any piece of clothing with various different colors such as turquoise, royal blue, pink, white, yellow, green, and red. The four stripes seen on this pattern each represents one of the main U.S. Virgin Islands, St. Thomas, St. John, and St. Croix. The fourth stripe represents the unity between them.

=== Cultural events ===
The U.S. Virgin Islands has a number of cultural events that engage both residents and visitors all year-round. Each of the three islands have different celebrations at different times of the year.

Carnival

Each year, the carnival on St. Thomas spans a month, kicking off with queen, prince, and princess shows, Calypso shows, Pan-O-Ramas, and J'ouvert. These events are typically held in April, then sometimes extends into the first week of May. The highlight of the carnival includes vibrant parades. The Children's Parade is usually the day before the Adults' Parade, and lasts for approximately 4 to 5 hours long, while the Adult Parade lasts all day long. Both parades feature performance troupes wearing colorful and sparkly costumes and decorated floats. These parades take place on Main Street in Charlotte Amalie.

Carnival village

The Carnival Village, also known as "the Village" by locals, is a place where people of all ages can go to for a variety of entertainment. There are decorated booths that sells food and drinks from different islands, a stage where bands and special guests perform, and an amusement park area with rides and games for all to enjoy. Every night, there is a concert. The Village is officially opened each year by the governor of the Virgin Islands and the Carnival Queen. The Carnival Village is typically open for about a week.

Food fair

The food fair is a day-long celebration where local cuisines and vibrant arts are showcased and sold. Each year around Carnival time, many vendors and patrons gather in the Emancipation Garden, located in Charlotte Amalie, to sell and purchase goods.

In addition to food and crafts, the event offers various forms of entertainment including steel pan music provided by local bands, like The Rising Stars, dance performances by local dance groups, and appearances by Carnival royalty and political figures.

Miracle on Main Street

Miracle on Main Street is an annual event held during the Christmas season is the historic downtown district of Charlotte Amalie, known as Main Street. This event includes various attractions such as Christmas carolers, Santas, steel pan battles, illuminated storefronts, and activities tailored for children. Vendors line the streets from Market Square all the way to the Emancipation Garden. These vendors offer homemade products, local cuisine and beverages, traditional attire, arts and crafts, and other locally made goods. Additionally, the event features the annual Lighted Boat Parade that takes place on the waterfront. Participating boats departs from the Crown Bay Marina at 6:30 pm and makes its way to the waterfront. These boats showcase their festive decorations, which illuminates the waters.

== Holidays and Heritage Month ==
=== Local Holidays ===
The Virgin Islands have various local holidays:

- V.I. Emancipation Day:

This holiday marks the anniversary of the emancipation of slaves in the U.S. Virgin Islands. It is observed annually on July 3.

- Virgin Islands–Puerto Rico Friendship Day:

This holiday celebrates the strong bond between the USVI and its neighboring island, Puerto Rico, because of their mutual contributions. It falls on the second Monday in October, coinciding with Columbus Day.

- David Hamilton Jackson Day/ Liberty Day:

A day commemorating David Hamilton Jackson, who was an advocate for the rights and freedoms of the people in the territory. This holiday is always celebrated on November 1.

- Transfer Day:

This holiday commemorates transfer of the U.S. Virgin Islands from the Danish to the U.S. It is always celebrated on March 31.

=== Virgin Islands History Month ===
During the month of March, Virgin Islands Heritage is celebrated. Each year, the celebration of this month offers an opportunity to honor the rich heritage, diversity, and contributions of the people of the Virgin Islands and also serves as a reminder of the legacy that has shaped the community.

Throughout the month, there are various events, activities, and educational initiatives, which are organized to highlight the cultural richness, historical significance, and societal impact of the Virgin Islands.

== Points of interest ==
Blackbeard's Castle

A historical sight built atop Government Hill in 1679. This castle was originally a watchtower safeguarding the harbor. The Danish soldiers used this tower to scan the seas for enemy ships. It was initially named the Skytsborg Tower, but was later named after the English pirate Edward Teach, also known as Blackbeard.

Bluebeard's Castle

A historic landmark perched atop a hill in Charlotte Amalie. According to local lore, the tower was built by the infamous pirate, Bluebeard, for his lover. However, historical records reveal that it was built in 1689 under the Danish Government and was originally called Frederik's Fort. It served as a watchtower, overlooking the town of Charlotte Amalie and Charlotte Amalie Harbor. The tower is currently an integral part of the Bluebeard's Castle Hotel.

Buck Island National Wildlife Refuge

Buck Island is an island located south of St. Thomas. This island was transferred to the United States Fish and Wildlife Service in 1969, because of its role as a crucial habitat for migratory birds. Notably, the island features one of the three Danish-built lighthouses in the U.S. Virgin Islands.

Cathedral Church of All Saints

The Cathedral Church of All Saints is located in Charlotte Amalie, St.Thomas. It was built in 1848 to celebrate the end of slavery. The building process faced hardship due to a severe drought, which caused the builders to use molasses into the mortar to bind stones together. This Cathedral functions as the seat of the Episcopal Diocese of the Virgin Islands. There is also a private school associated with the cathedral called All Saints Cathedral School.

Coral World Ocean Park

Coral World Ocean Park is one of the most popular tourist attractions in St. Thomas, offering an indoor-outdoor aquarium experience. Guests can observe various sea animals, such as small sharks, stingrays, and starfish. The park also provides opportunities for an up-close encounter with sharks, sea lions, and dolphins. This attraction is located next to Coki (pronounced "cookie" locally) Point Beach.

Fort Christian

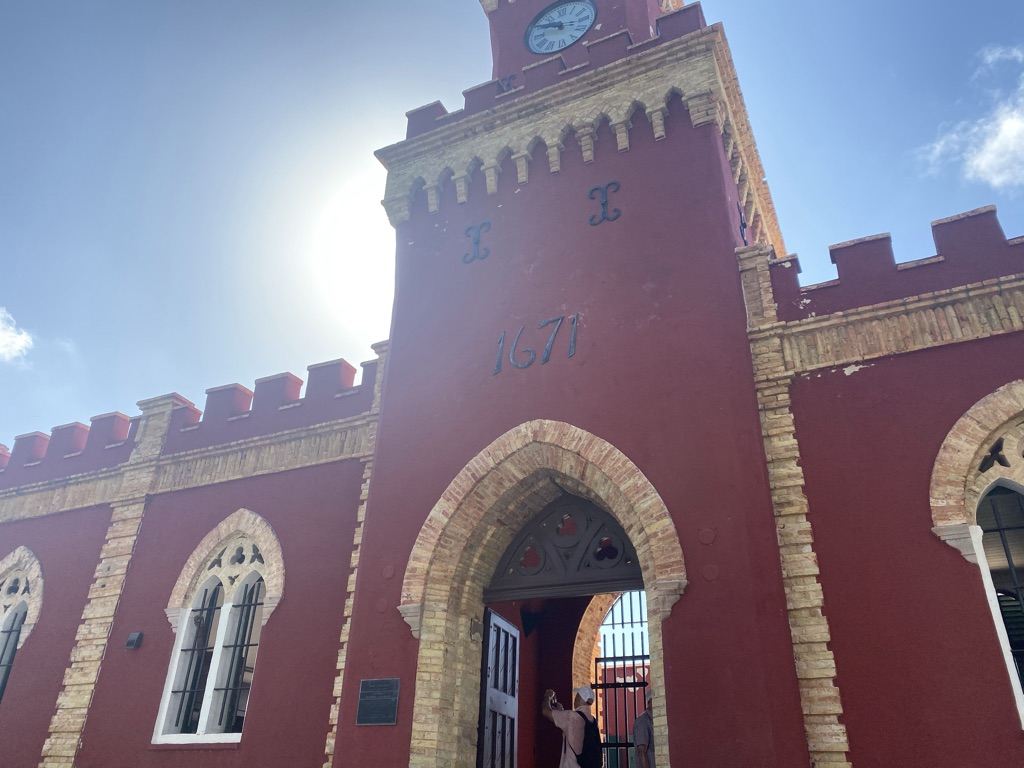
A picture of Fort Christian

Fort Christian is a historical fort, located in Charlotte Amalie, St. Thomas. It was built by the Dano-Norwegian alliance between 1672 and 1680. Notably, it holds the distinction of being the oldest standing structure in the Virgin Islands. It was originally built as defensive bastion to safeguard the island. This fort was named after King Christian V of Denmark.

Over the centuries, Fort Christian has fulfilled a variety of roles. It first served as a military outpost, then became a town center, government building, Lutheran Church, police station, and a prison. It presently stands as a historical museum that offers insight into its past. Furthermore, Fort Christian is recognized as a National Historic Landmark.

Magens Bay Arboretum

The Magens Bay Arboretum spans five acres and is managed by the Magens Bay Authority. Originally, it was cultivated by Arthur Fairchild in the 1920s, but was later gifted to the community. This arboretum showcases 200 plant species from 71 families. The arboretum was neglected after the passing of Fairchild, but in 1974, the University of the Virgin Islands alongside the Charlotte Amalie Rotary Club began to restore it.

Saints Peter and Paul Cathedral

This Cathedral was the first Catholic church in the Danish West Indies, and bought from the Danish in 1802. Two years after it was built, in 1804, it was destroyed by fire.It was later restored, but was ravaged by a hurricane in 1837. Despite these challenges, it was rebuilt into its present form. Notably, the Cathedral's ceilings are adorned with murals depicting over 11 scenes from both the Old and New Testaments.

St. Thomas Synagogue

Ranked among the five National Historic Landmarks in the U.S. Virgin Islands, this synagogue stands as the second-oldest in the United States. Originally constructed in 1803, it suffered several fires, leading to its reconstruction in 1833, and its eventual restoration in 2000. This is the home for the Hebrew Congregation of St. Thomas. It hosts weekly services and doubles as a museum, welcoming both locals and visitors to explore its rich heritage.

Mountain Top

Mountain Top is a popular tourist attraction located atop St. Peter Mountain on St.Thomas. It is the tallest site on the island, standing at 640 meters above sea level. It offers a variety of amenities such as a shopping center, restaurant, and bar. Visitors can also enjoy the observatory deck, which provides a view of cays, Puerto Rico, Culebra, and the British Virgin Islands. Additionally, Mountain Top is known as the birthplace of the banana daiquiri.

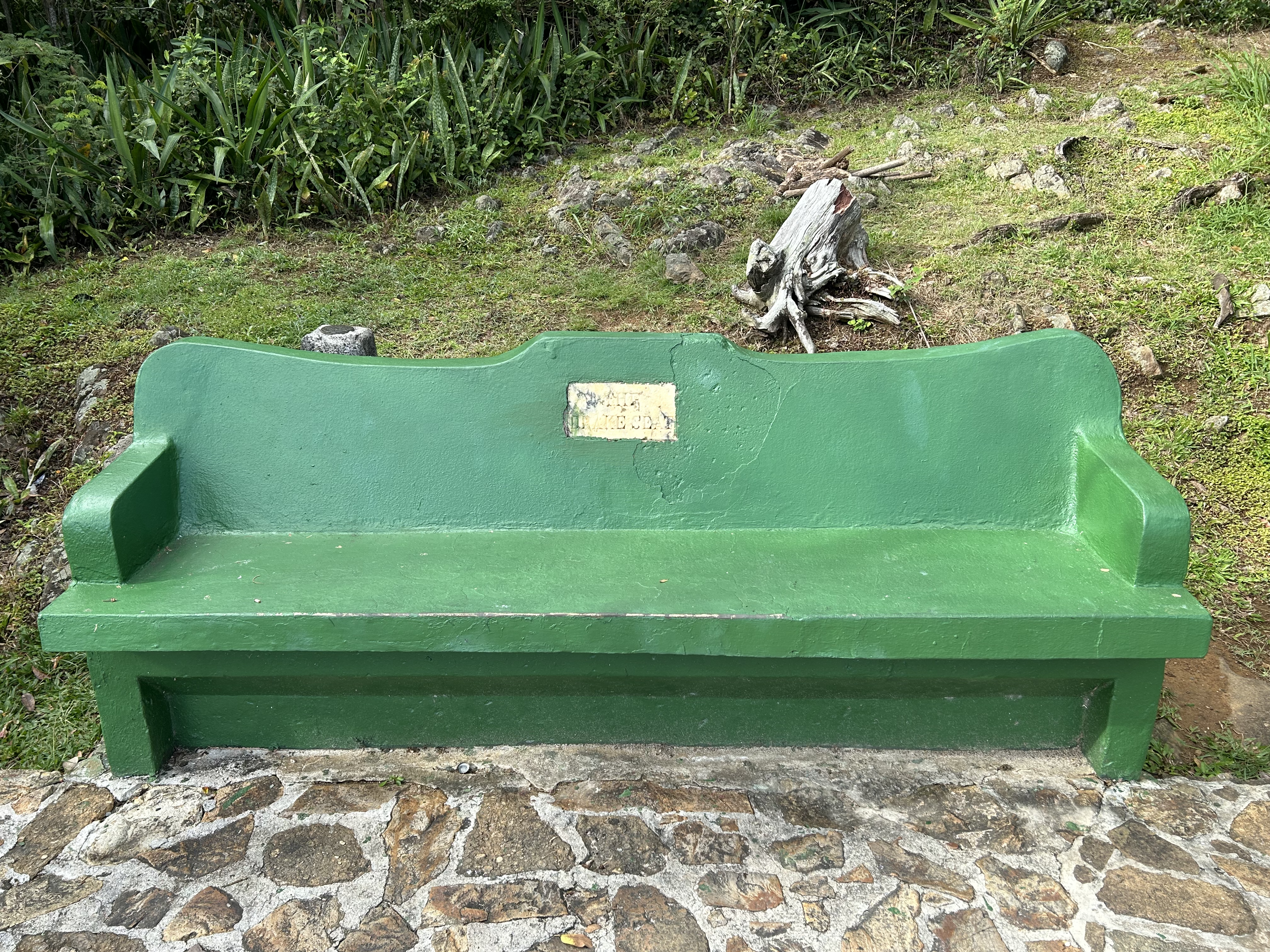
An up-close picture of Drake's Seat

Drake's Seat

Drake's Seat, positioned on the Northside of St. Thomas, serves as a tourist destination, which offers a panoramic view of Magens Bay Beach. This location is easily identifiable by an open lookout area on one side of the road and a distinctive green bench that says, "The Drake Seat", on the other. According to local lore, it was constructed by Sir Francis Drake, an English privateer, who used this spot as a point to survey the horizon for approaching enemy ships.

Three Queens Statue

A bronze monument of three important historical women: Queen Mary, Queen Agnes, and Queen Matilda. These three women led a revolution against the Danish Government, demanding enhanced working and living conditions, alongside fairer wages. This Revolution is known as the "Fireburn". This statue is located in Charlotte Amalie, St. Thomas.

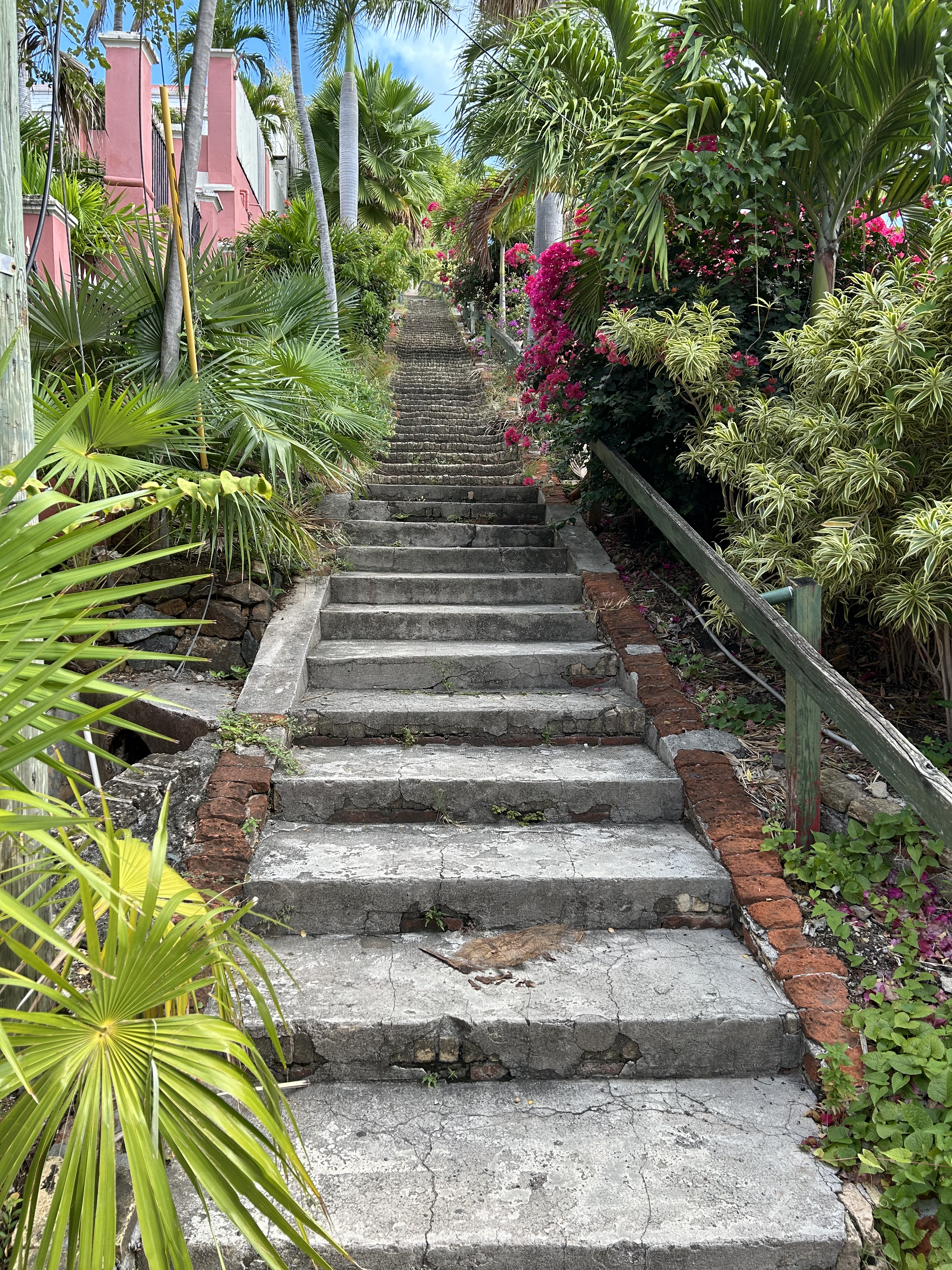
An up-view of 99 Steps

99 Steps

One of the many step-streets located in Charlotte Amalie. Of all the other step-streets it is the most popular. These steps were constructed during the 1700s by the Danish. Though its name is "99 Steps", it actually has 103 steps. Crafted from bricks repurposed from the ballast of Danish ships, these steps wind their way up to Blackbeard's Castle. It was originally named Store Taarne Gade, which means Greater Tower Street.

== Gallery ==
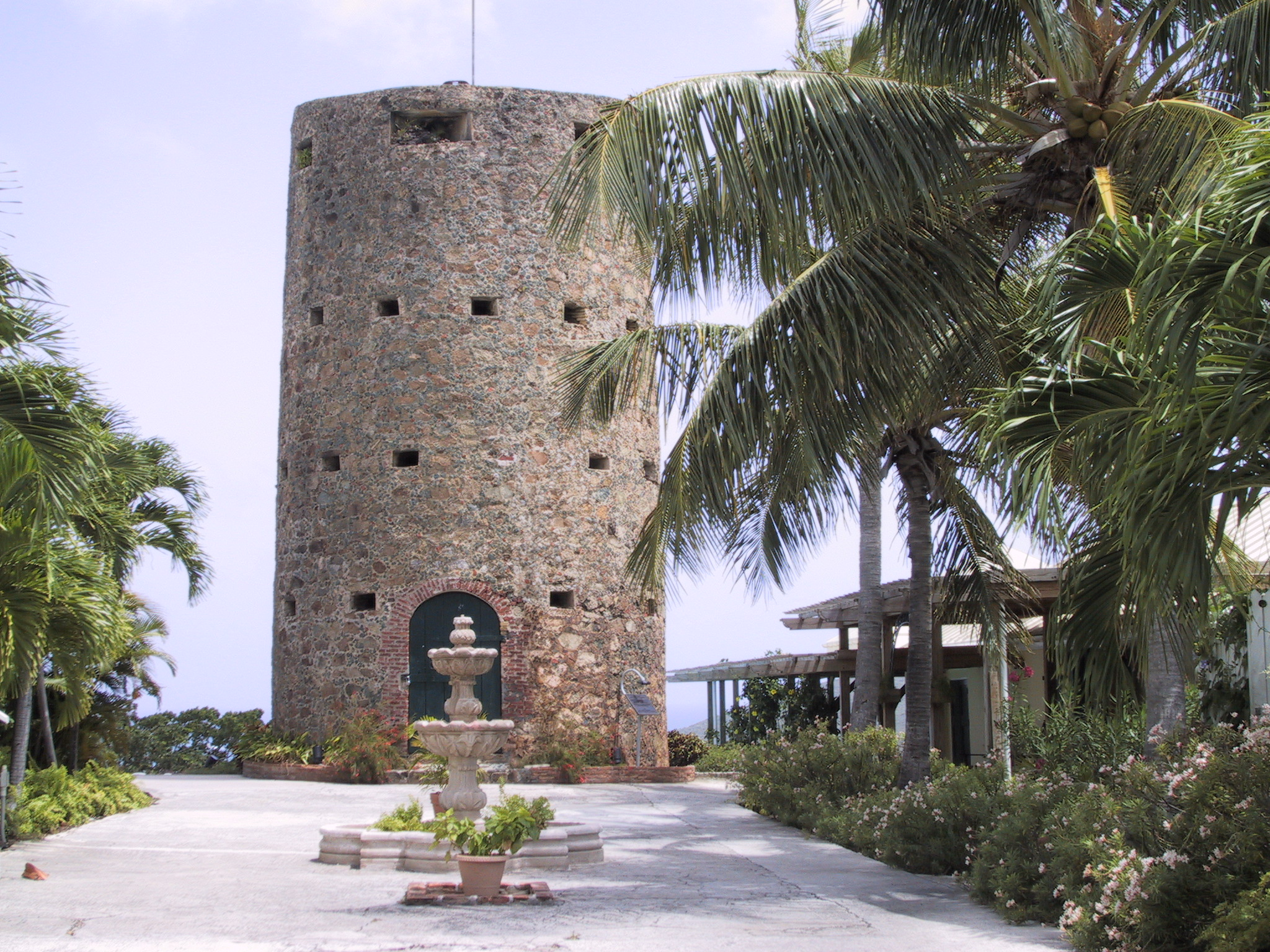
Blackbeard's Castle in Charlotte Amalie

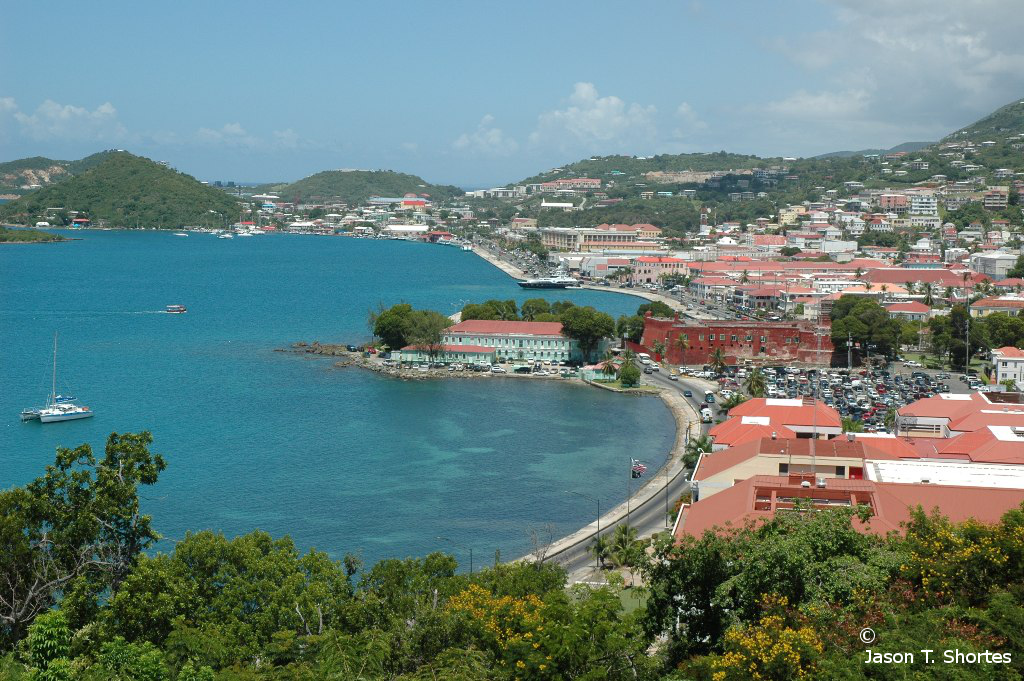
View from Bluebeard's Castle, St. Thomas

Magens Bay as seen from Drake's Seat, St. Thomas

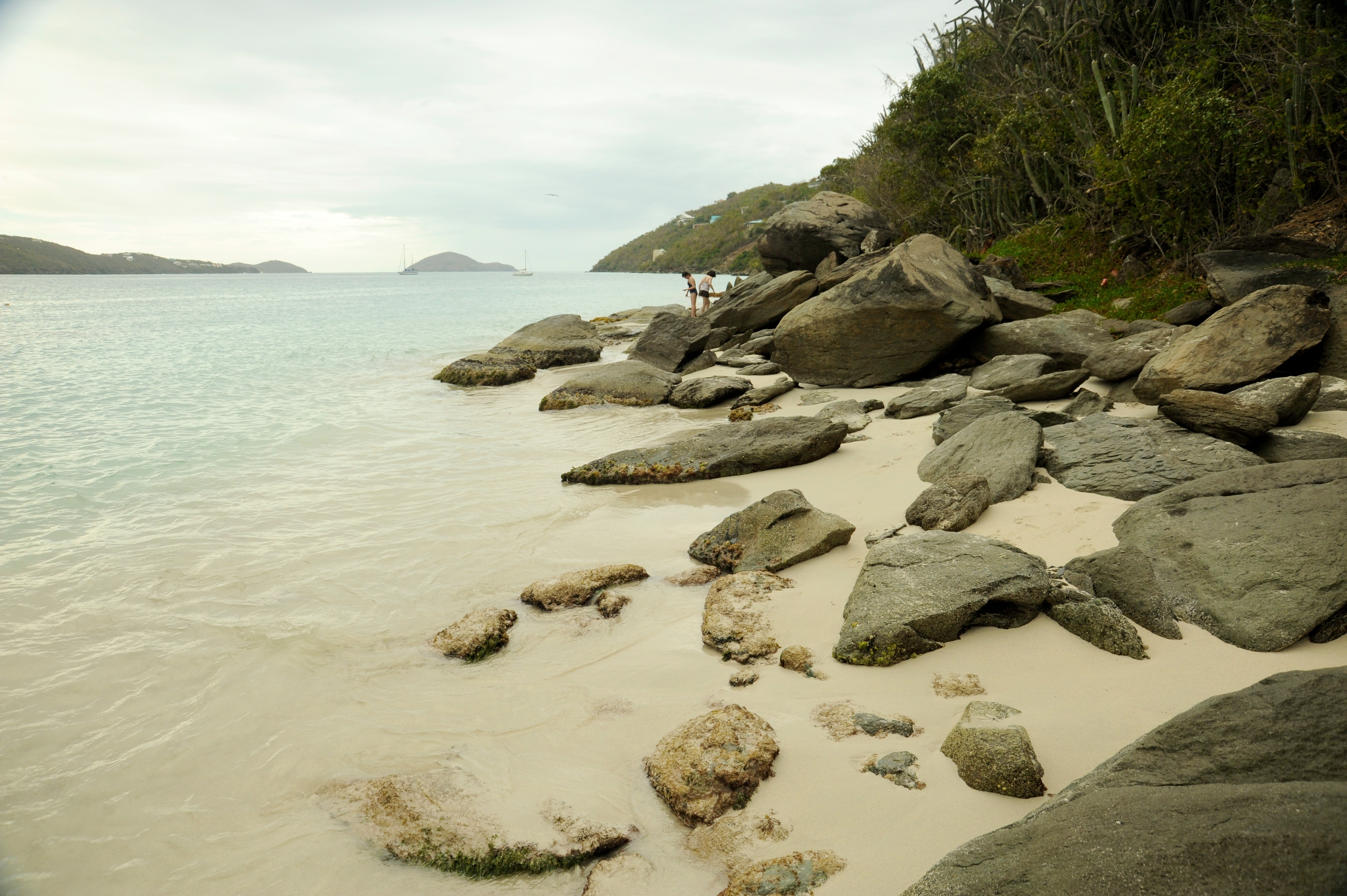
Magens Bay

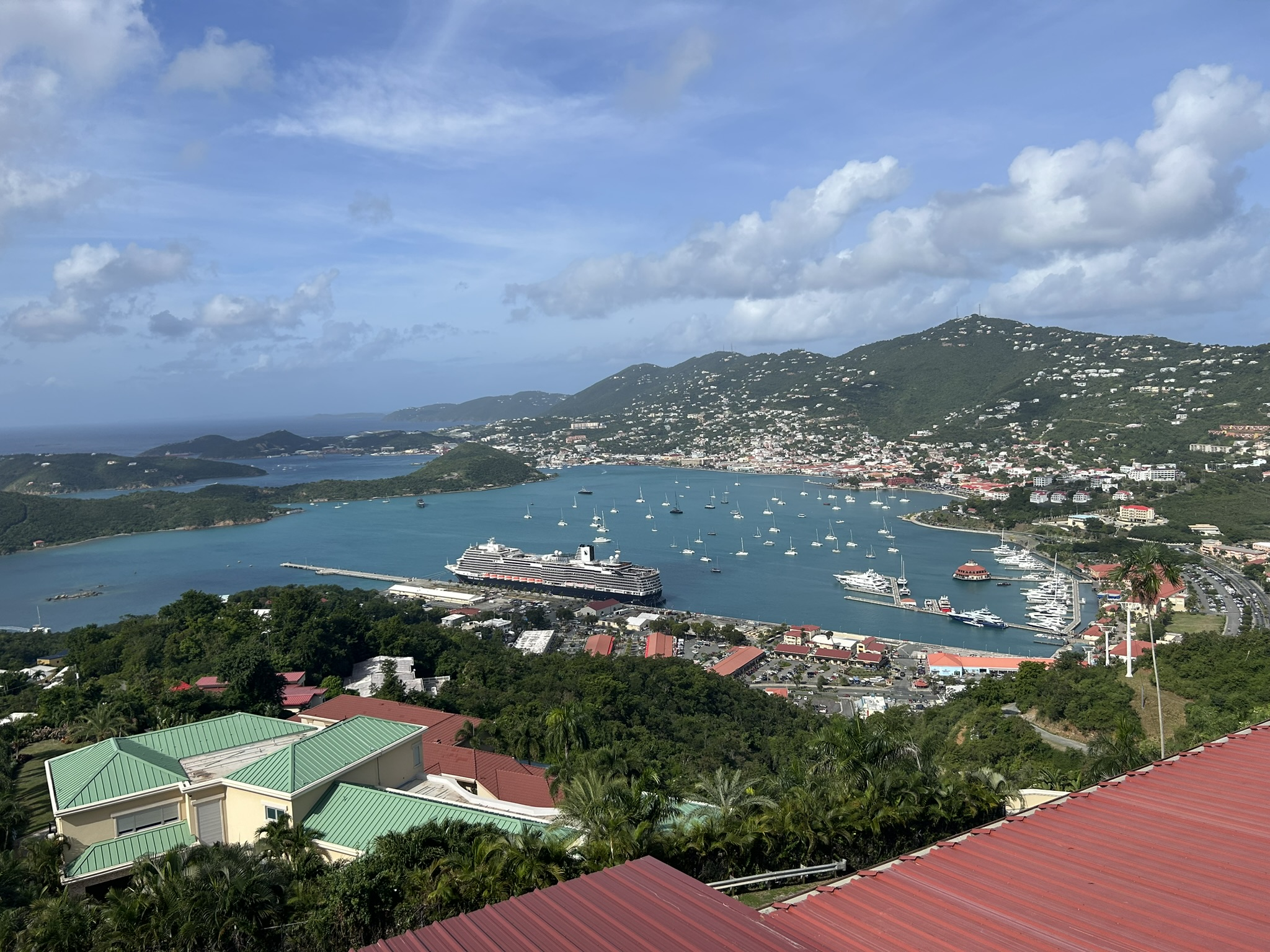
A view of St. Thomas' Waterfront taken from Paradise Point

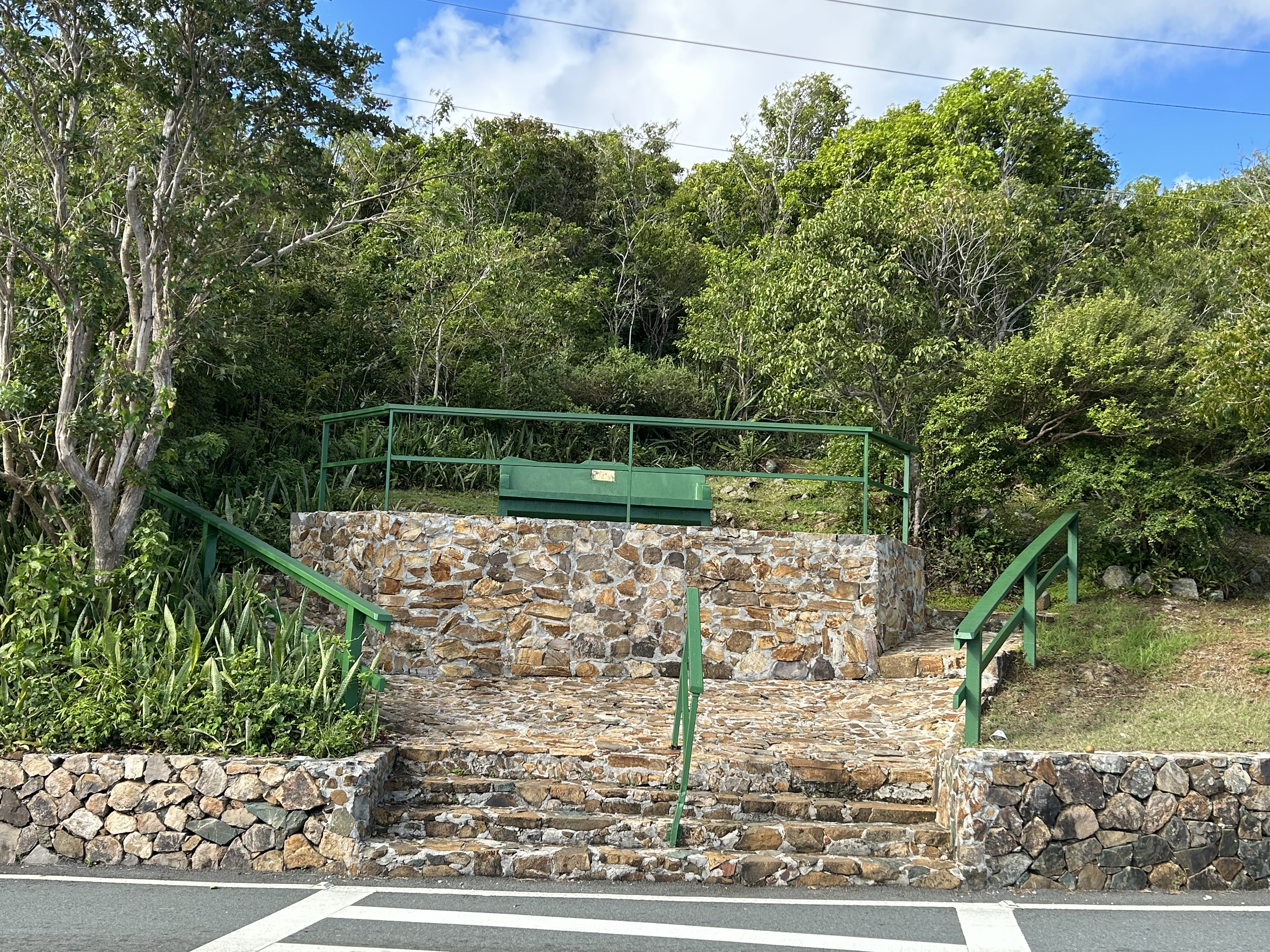
Drake's Seat from across the street

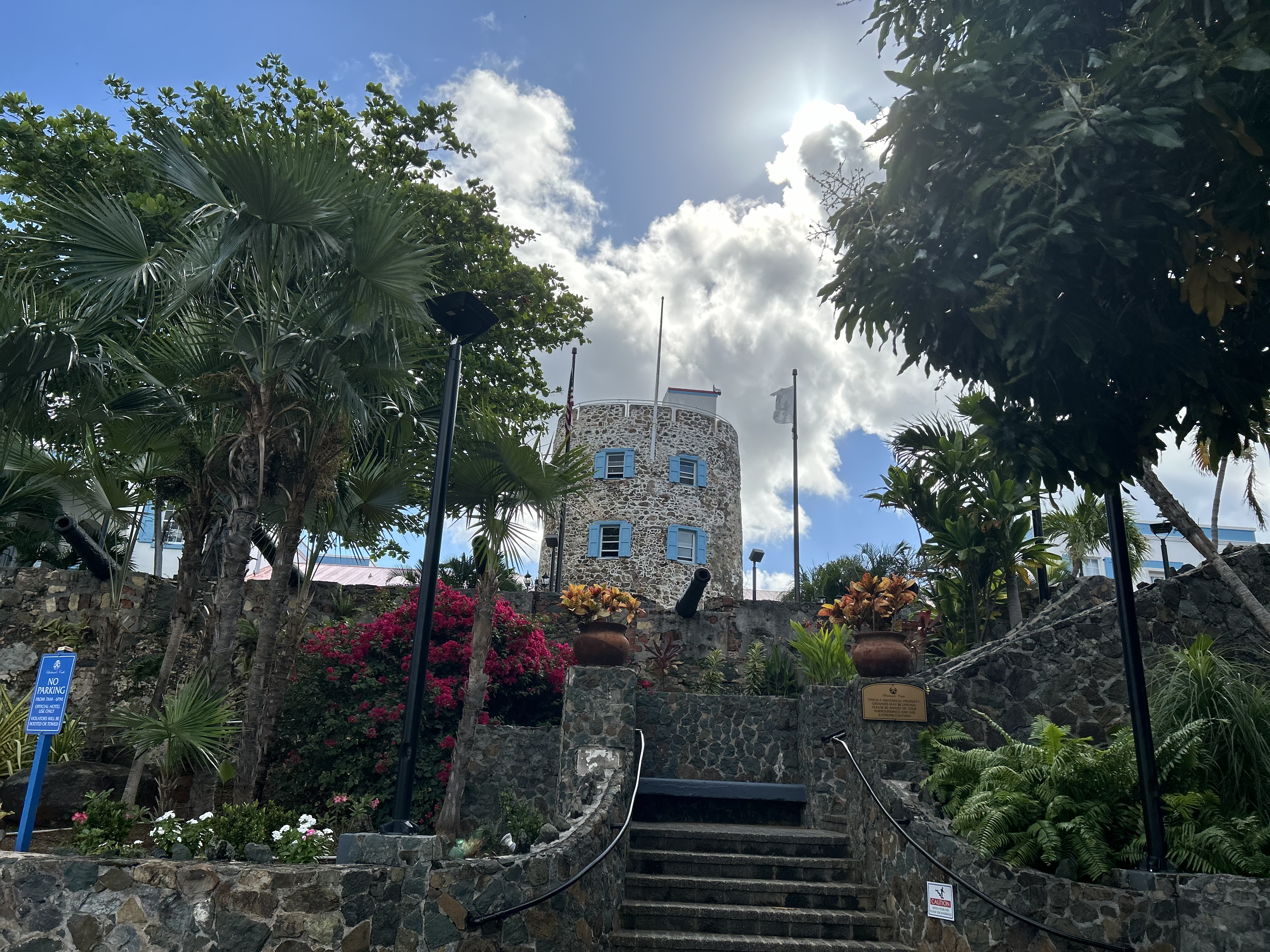
Bluebeard's Castle in Charlotte Amalie

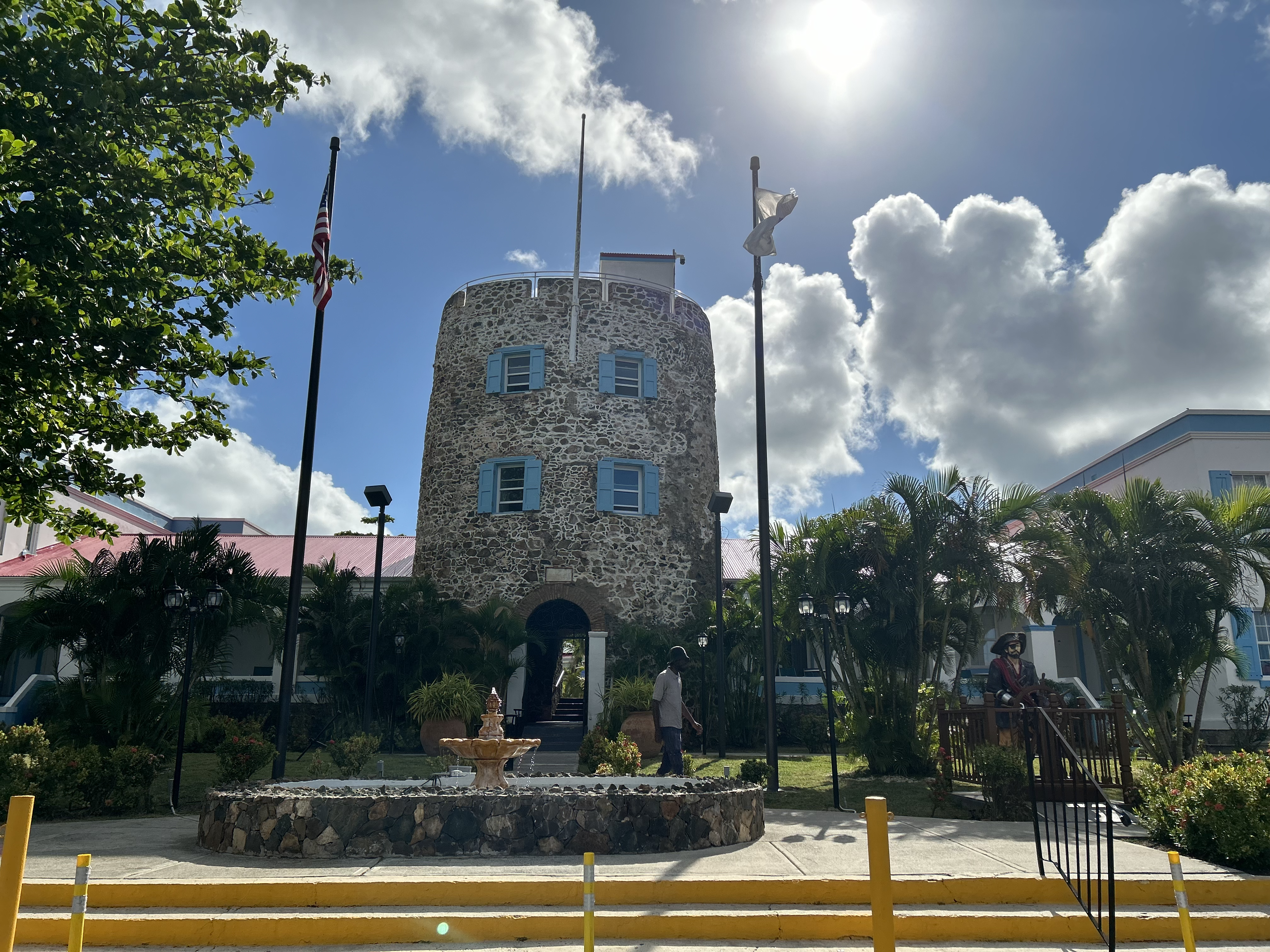
Bluebeard's Castle from another view

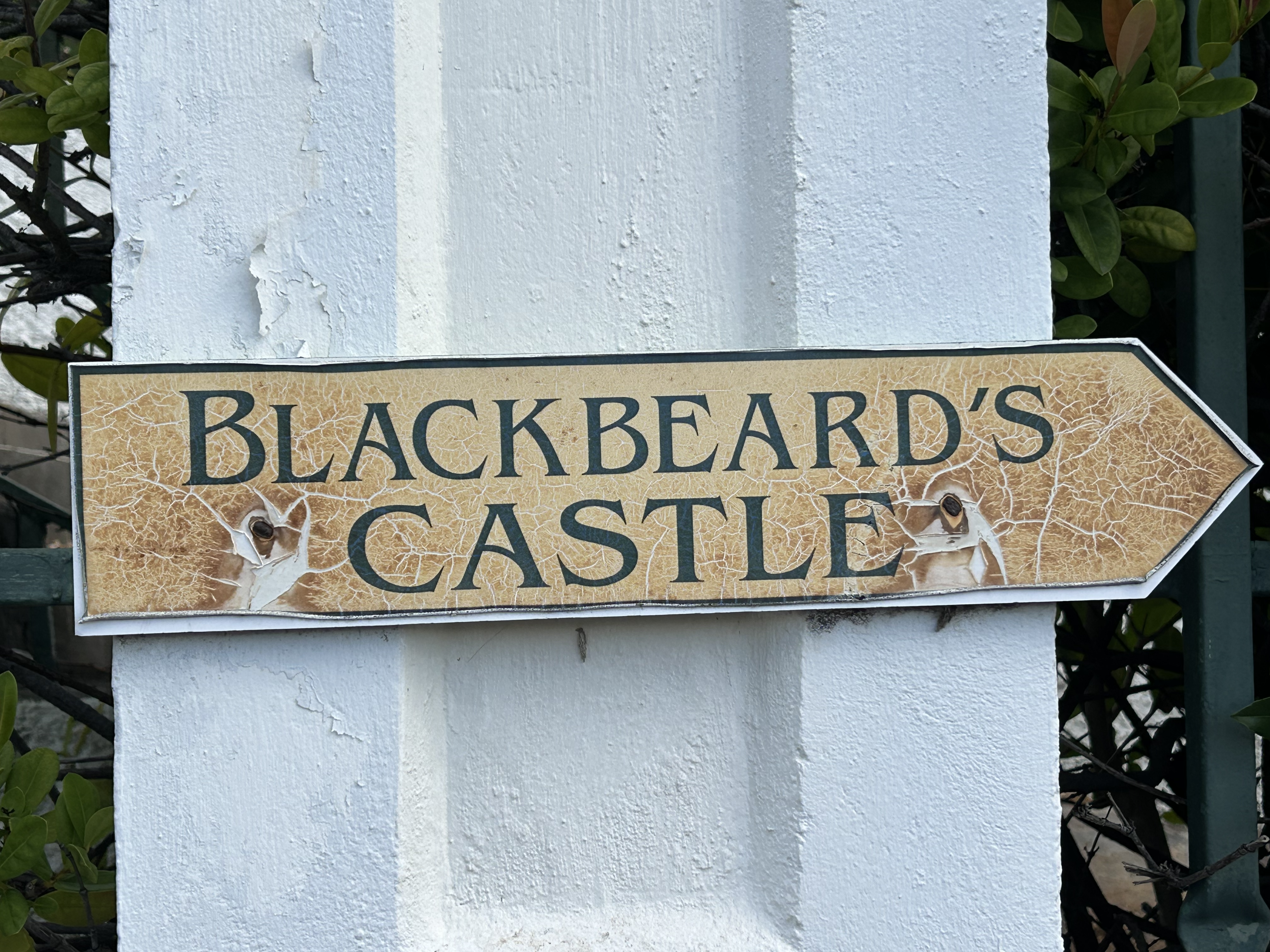
A sign leading to Blackbeard's Castle

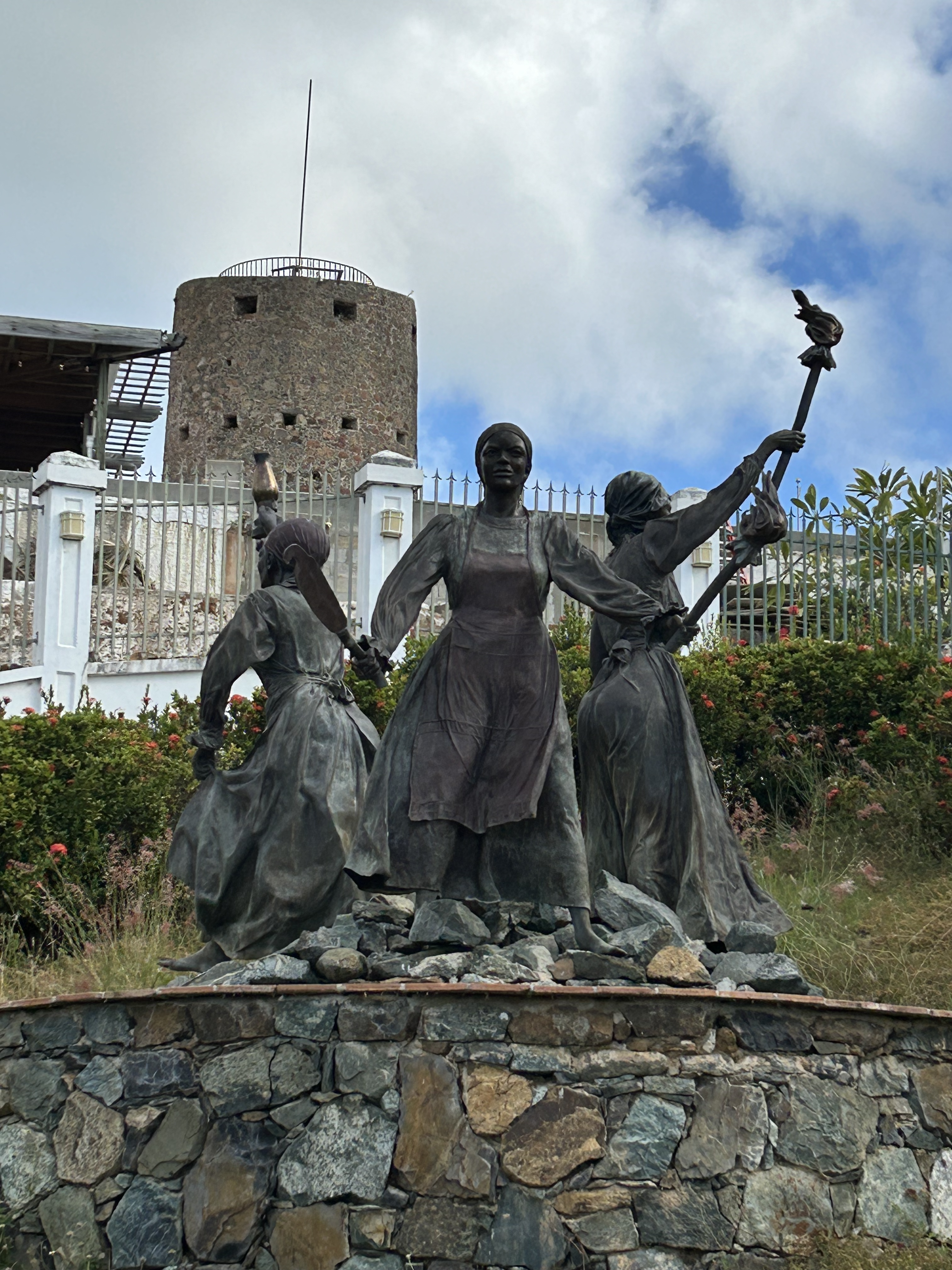
An up-front picture of the Three Queens Statue
