= Tere Marichal =

Puerto Rican actress and writer

Maria Teresa "Tere" Marichal Lugo, (born May 24, 1956) better known as her character Maria Chuzema is a Puerto Rican actor, writer, ventriloquist, playwright and television personality. For 25 years starting in 1987, her television show, *La Casa de Maria Chuzema", was shown on Puerto Rico's government channel, the PBS-affiliated Canal 6.

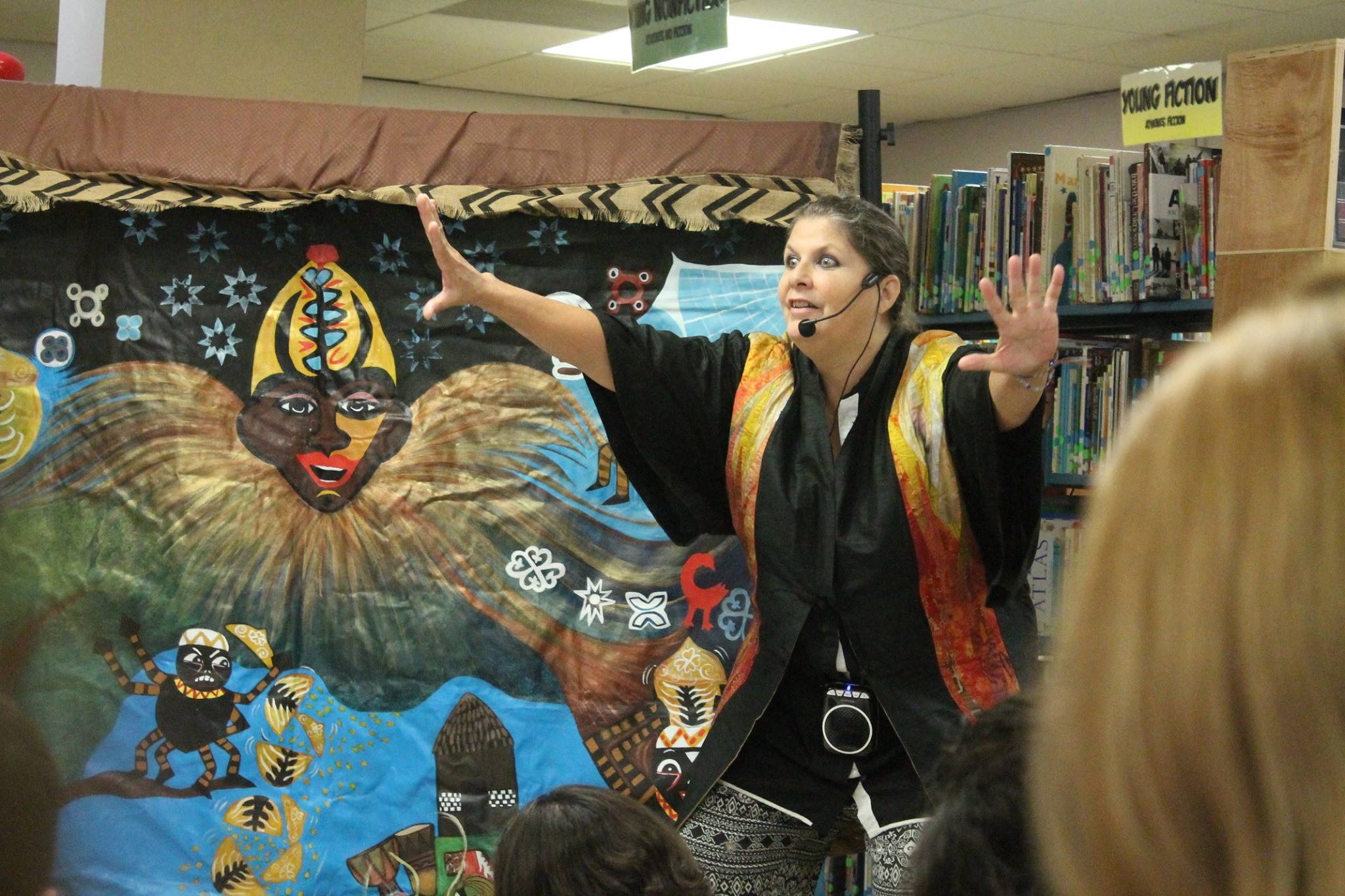
Tere Marichal, storyteller from Puerto Rico, telling the afro-caribbean folktale of Anansi at Biblioteca Juvenil de Mayagüez during a Multicultural Children's Book Day activity

== Biography ==
Marichal was born in Yauco, Puerto Rico, the daughter of a Spaniard named Carlos Marichal, who was an artist and scenographer, and mother Flavia Lugo, a schoolteacher and radio show writer.

== Writings ==
As of 2020, Marichal had written some 31 books that have been published, both in Spanish and in English.

Victoria Espinosa directed La Isla Antilla by Marichal, which went on tour to North America in 1996.

== Awards ==
For her work, Marichal has been awarded two Emmy's as well as the "René Marqués Award", which she won for her play, "La Obra de los Dioses" ("The Work of the Gods").

== Personal life ==
During 2018, Marichal revealed that she had suffered domestic violence at a point in her life.

=== Health issues ===
During June of 2020, Marichal told Puerto Rican newspaper El Vocero that she had recuperated from a bout with COVID-19. Her son, Miguel, who was, as of 2020, incarcerated at the Federal Correctional Institution, Fort Dix in New Jersey, United States, also suffered from that disease.

== See also ==
- List of Puerto Ricans
- Luis Oliva (Puerto Rican actor)
- Norma Krasinski - "Chicola"
