= Harry Fraticelli =

Puerto Rican singer and musician

Harry Fraticelli Santiago (born July 6, 1944 in Yauco, Puerto Rico) is a Puerto Rican singer and musician. He has been a member of various musical groups and released a number of albums, both as a group member and as a solo artist.

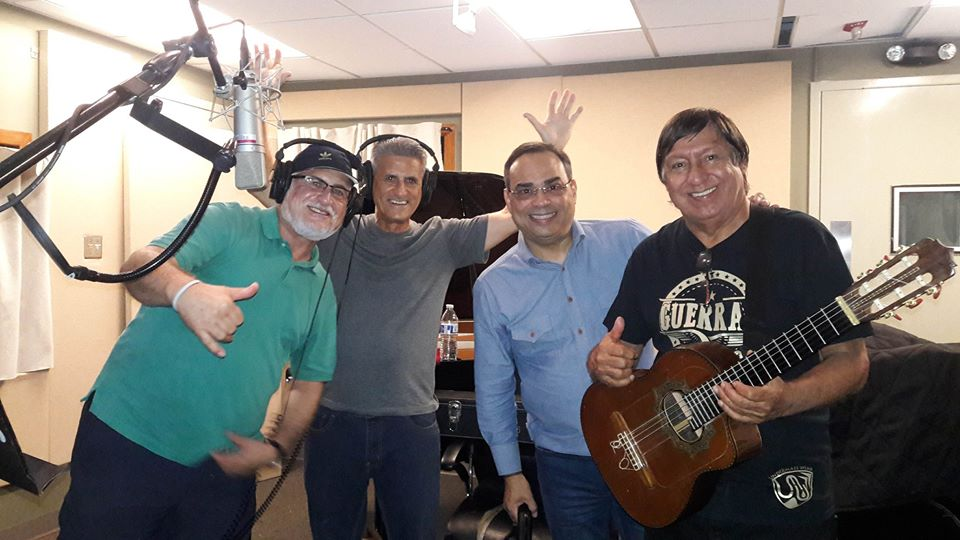
Harry Fraticelli (far right, in black shirt), Gilberto Santa Rosa (middle right), Tony Rivas (middle left) and Jerry Rivas (near left)

== Early life ==
Fraticelli is the son of Francisco Fraticelli and of Ramona Santiago. His father was an amateur guitarist and his mother an amateur singer, they had met at a party.

During Fraticelli's babyhood, he was often put to sleep by his older brothers, who used music to relax young Harry. Fraticelli's brothers would play typical Puerto Rican trío music as lullabies. This way, they indirectly introduced the baby to music, specifically guitar music, which Fraticelli enjoyed since then.

Fraticelli began playing with his brothers at age 12.

== Singing career ==
Initially, Fraticelli played the maracas on the trío he and his two brothers founded.

At age 18, he, his brother Julio "Erving" Fraticelli and their friend José Luis Padilla decided to move from Yauco, in southern Puerto Rico, to the Puerto Rican capital of San Juan, to try their luck as a trío, naming themselves Trío Los Altairos, a band which debuted on a show named Tribunal del Arte (The Art Rostrum), a canal 2 television show hosted by Rafael Quiñones Vidal. The trío won a first-place award at that show; Fraticelli then gained fame as a trío singer in Puerto Rico.

In 1964, aged 20, Fraticelli joined a trío named Aidita Viles y Los Del Río (not to be confused with the Spanish duo of the 1990s, Los del Río). They played at the Caribe Hilton Hotel in Old San Juan and were able to release a number of albums for the Musicor and Rico Vox labels.

After that initial success, Fraticelli decided to return to Yauco, aiming at extending his newly found celebrity to the southern area of Puerto Rico. By that time, guitarist Güichi Rodríguez, a Puerto Rican who had established himself in New York City, decided to return to Puerto Rico, himself also looking to expand his fame. He met Fraticelli and Fraticelli's friend José Luis Padilla, convincing them to join him in making another trío, which was later contracted to play music for one year at the Copamarina Hotel in Guánica.

Wider success for Fraticelli arrived when Máximo Torres offered him a spot in a group that was being formed, named Los Barbarians (later to be also known as Harry Fraticelli y Los Barbarians). Their first album was named El Mamito (The Handsome One), which lead to Fraticelli receiving that album's title as a nickname himself. Soon after, their song Te Pido Perdón (I Ask For your Forgiveness) became a major hit on the Puerto Rican airwaves.

With Los Barbarians, Fraticelli became known as a salsa singer. The band recorded a number of albums, which yielded additional hits such as Temeridad (Temerity), and participated in concerts with Richie Ray, Bobby Cruz, Tito Rodríguez, Willie Colón, Hector Lavoe and others.

Harry and Los Barbarians have performed on and off ever since; Fraticelli has been involved in a total of 15 albums as a singer and many more as a musician. Harry Fraticelli has, in addition, been a musical director and he directed former basketball player Fufi Santori's musical production, El Sentimiento de Fufi (Fufi's Feeling), where the legendary Puerto Rican former basketball star made his singing debut.

In 2009, Fraticelli joined a band named Pijuan y Los Baby Boomers, a group which was fronted by Puerto Rican singer Pijuan. He recorded two albums with that band.

For a time also, Fraticelli was a member of comedian and singer Tavin Pumarejo's music group, Rio Cañas Sound Machine (a band whose name mocked the well-known group, Miami Sound Machine)

== Radio hosting career ==
At various times, Fraticelli has hosted radio shows in Puerto Rico. By the early 2020s, he was working at WIPR-FM, on a show named Harry Fraticelli y Sus Amigos (Harry Fraticelli and Friends).

== See also ==
- List of Puerto Ricans
