= Jean Joseph Sibilly =

Virgin Islander restaurant owner (1889–1997)

Jean Joseph Sibilly (5 January 1889 – 1977) was a West Indian farmer and community leader. Born in St. Barthelemy, he grew up in Guadeloupe and moved to St. Thomas in his 20s where he and other farmers purchased a co-operative farm. Sibilly built roads and operated a grocery store which later became a restaurant, providing necessary services for the community. Sibilly also donated land for a church, cemetery, and government buildings in St Thomas.

== Early life ==
Sibilly was born on 5 January 1889 in St. Barthelemy but grew up in Guadeloupe. He studied husbandry, as well as agriculture while he was in Guadeloupe. In 1912, Sibilly moved to St. Thomas, living on the north side of the island in an area that was heavily populated with French immigrants .

== Career and accomplishments ==
His career in agriculture was furthered after he purchased several hundred acres with other farmers on the north side of St. Thomas to be used for farming. Sibilly provided fresh produce for many years with his skills and knowledge of farming. Not only did he provide goods for the people, but he also planned road systems on the north side. He also contributed to the construction of homes and public buildings.

In 1924, Sibilly opened a grocery store and bar named "The Shop". The French immigrants on the north side would travel by donkey to get into town to get groceries, since there were no grocery stores on the Northside. This allowed for the residents of north side to be able to have a closer option of somewhere to get groceries or stop and have a drink. As time passed, the locals and stationed Navy members in the area pushed for a place to eat and socialize, which is when the shop turned into a restaurant, which is now known as "Sibs". After growing increasingly more busy with his personal dealings in real estate, he began to lease the property. In 2018, management turned back to being run by immediate family.

Sibilly also donated large amounts of land which allowed for a church, cemetery and government buildings to be built for the community. Sibilly died in 1977 at the age of 88.

== Legacy ==
St Thomas' Robert Herrick Elementary School was renamed the Joseph Sibilly School in his honor in 1973. The road in front of the school was also named Joseph Sibilly Drive. After his passing, over 115 of his family members gathered to celebrate his life for all of his contributions to the community. He was extremely loved and respected by those that were surrounded by him and his addition to the community is still remembered today.
