= Emancipation Garden =

Park in Saint Thomas, U.S. Virgin Islands

Coordinates: 18.3412°N 64.9303°W

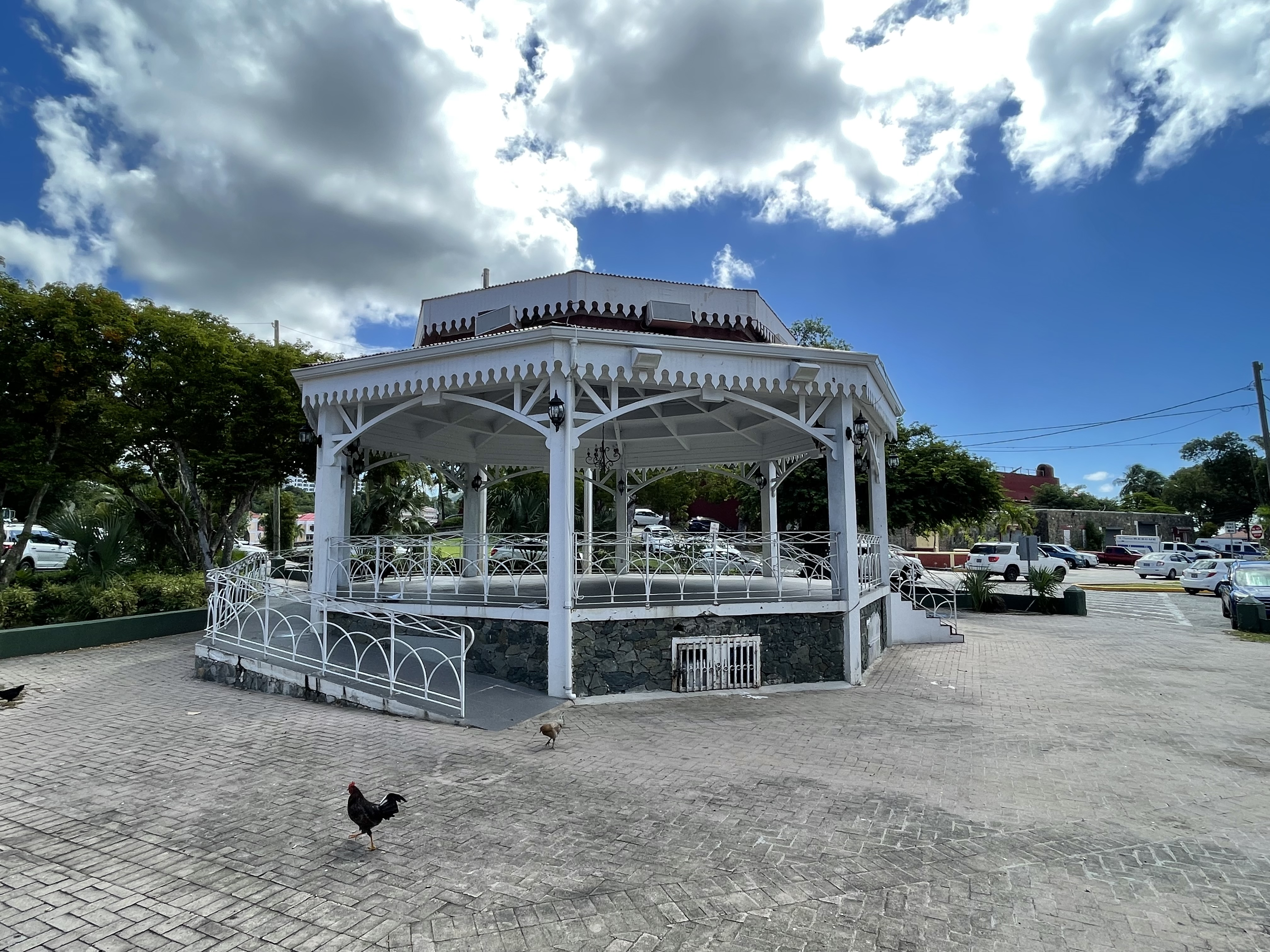
The gazebo in the Emancipation Garden on St Thomas is the site for concerts and government ceremonies.

Emancipation Garden is a park in Saint Thomas, U.S. Virgin Islands

The park was built to commemorate the freeing of the slaves, which took place on July 3, 1848. A commemorative plaque, a bronze bust of a freed slave blowing a conch shell, and a replica of the Liberty Bell are featured. The park was also ringed with a fence of old ships' anchor chain and cannons recovered from the harbor.

The park is surrounded by historical buildings, including the Emancipation Garden Post Office and Government House. Official government ceremonies are frequently held here.

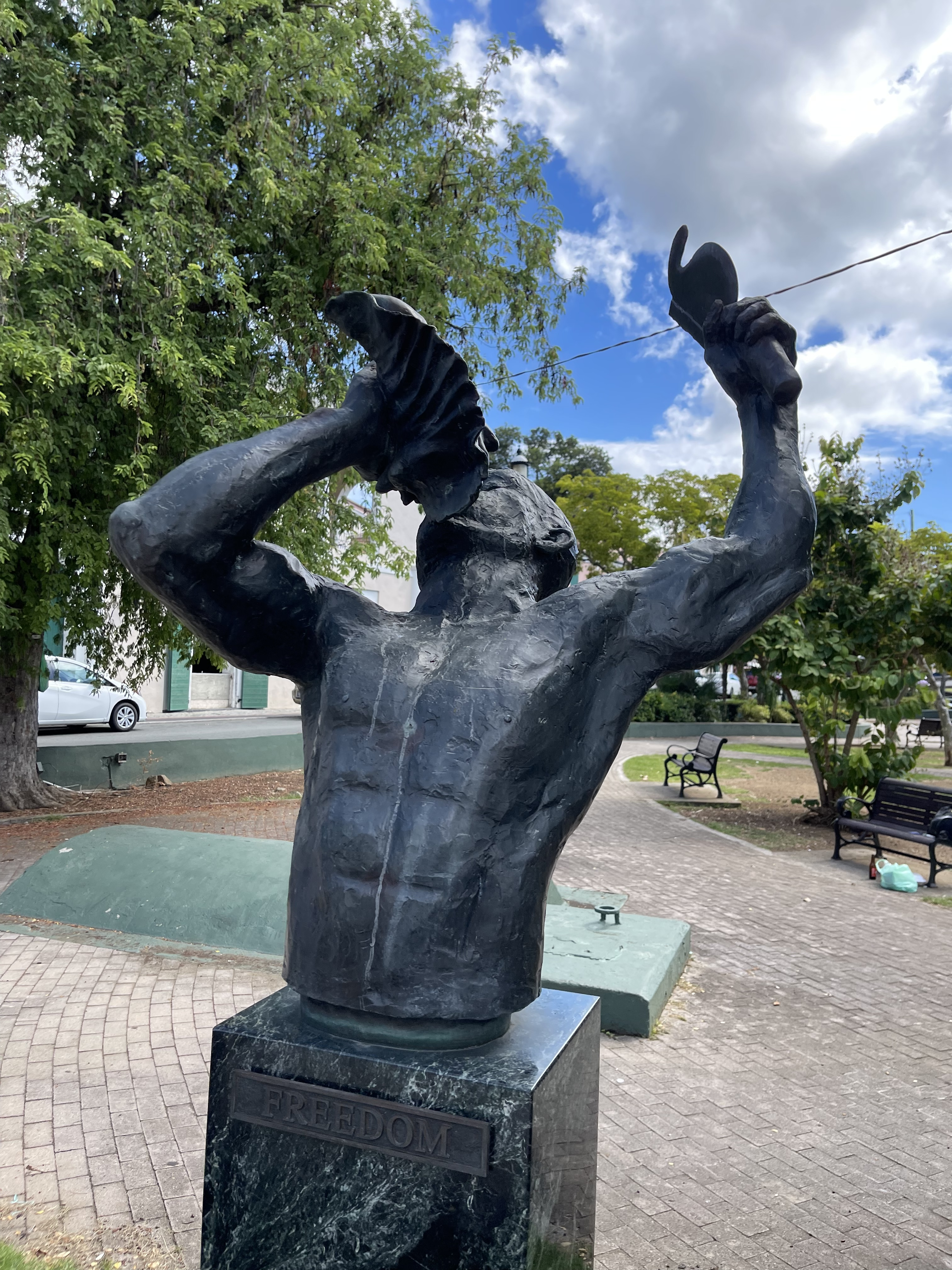
Emancipation Garden, a bronze bust of a freed slave blowing a conch shell

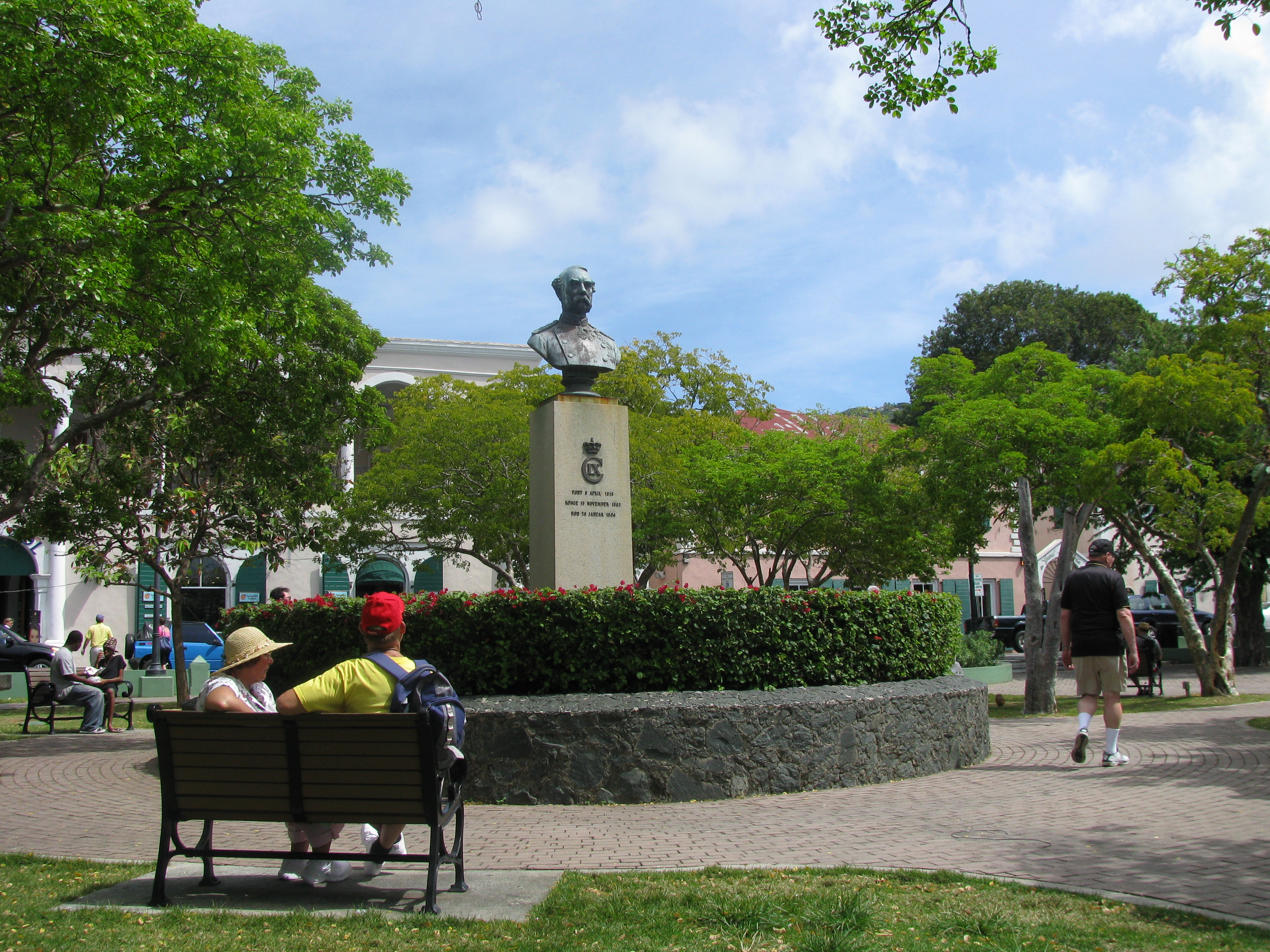
A view of Emancipation Garden

The trees shading the park are lignum vitae, one of the hardest and slowest growing trees on earth, and commonly used in colonial times as foundation posts for island buildings.

The gazebo hosts concerts and other activities throughout the year, including a free concert by Jimmy Cliff in 1980.
