= Pijuán =

Puerto Rican musician

José Juan Piñero González
- Also known as: Pijuán
- Born: José Juan Piñero González; August 29, 1942; Río Piedras, Puerto Rico
- Died: March 14, 2018 (aged 75) Hato Rey, Puerto Rico
- Genres: Salsa, son, guaguancó, boogaloo, bomba, plena
- Occupations: Musician, Pianist, Band Leader, A&R Representative, TV Producer
- Instruments: Piano, organ, lyre, melodica
- Label: Musigol Records
- Website: Website

José Juan Piñero González (August 29, 1942 – March 14, 2018), better known as Pijuán, was a Puerto Rican musician who produced and/or has been credited on several albums under the record labels Phillips Borinquen, Hit Parade, Kubaney, Discos Melón, TH Records, Private Ranch Records and Musigol Records.

== Early life and career ==
Pijuán's love for music began during childhood, entertaining the crowds with a small band while attending Escuela Superior República de Colombia in San Juan, Puerto Rico. After completing studies at the University of Puerto Rico, Pijuán combined tropical rhythms creating his own musical identity called "salsa lounge", throughout festivals playing salsa, son, guaguancó, guaracha, bomba, plena, ballad, mambo, jala jala, calypso, and bugalú.

During his career, he met instrumental individuals such as the director of the orchestra Rafael Muñoz, expanding the opportunity to play in prestigious hotels around Puerto Rico. Another key individual and composer was Paquito López Vidal, with whom Pijuán worked together at the Fiesta Room in the Hotel Condado Beach.

In 1964, Pijuán put together a sextet of musicians to work at the Barraca, has worked in several countries throughout the world, such as Aruba, Curazao, Colombia, Venezuela, Panamá, Perú, and the United States (Washington and New York City), thus establishing the sextet at the very same Hotel Condado Beach the following year.

== TV shows ==
During the next decades, Pijuán showcased his vibrant Sextet to Puerto Rican TV viewers, and/or invited local musicians to shows like Show Coca-Cola, Sábado a las 12 con Pijuán and Fiestas Fijas con Pijuán – Telemundo Canal 2 (1967–1972); produced and directed La Factoría de la Salsa – TeleSiete (1973–1974); El Show del Mediodía – Channel 4 – WAPA-TV (1974–1976); and again, followed same format for the ‘new’ show Pijuán produced/directed La Nueva Factoría de la Salsa – TeleSiete (1980–1981); Encantados con Maggie (1983–1986) was part of the segment called El show de las 12 produced by Paquito Cordero and hosted by Eddie Miro – Telemundo / Canal 2 (until 1Q-2005); and Con La Música X Dentro – CLMXD on WPRV TV / Canal 13 – or Tele-Oro, broadcast directly from Pijuán's home, along with telecancionero—a karaoke format show (2007–2009).

== News ==
Pijuán recorded with Baby Boomer Boys, a group consisting of Edward Delgado, Harry Fraticelli, Esteban Rivera, Sammy Aguirre and Tony Guayama.

Pijuán worked both media circuits, TV and music, for several years, providing a stepping stone for others to follow. Pijuán met famous acclaimed musicians and actors like Rocio Durcal, and Liza Minnelli to mention a couple.

In 2016, Pijuán celebrated his fifty-year career as a professional musician by playing at several venues around Puerto Rico.

Pijuan died on Tuesday March 14, 2018, at age 76 due to cardiac complications at Auxilio Mutuo Hospital, in Hato Rey, Puerto Rico. He was buried at Borinquen Memorial Park Cemetery in Carolina, Puerto Rico.

== Discography ==
LPs compiled compliments of Herencia Latina:

- 2010 – Pijuán y Los Baby Boomer Boys – Bohemia Bailable – Musigol Records
- 1986 – Bizcocho & Pijuán – El premio 'Gordo' del Sabor – Private Ranch Records
- 1983 – Grandes Hits Navideños de Pijuán – Private Ranch Records
- 1982 – Harry Fraticelli – El Cantante del Pueblo (produced by Pijuán) – Private Ranch Records
- 1982 – Orlando Pabellón – Ahora Sí Que Estamos...Heavy (produced by Pijuán) – Private Ranch Records
- 1982 – Pijuán – Temas de Amor – Introducing Sammy Aguirre – Private Ranch Records
- 1981 – Pijuán – La Supertrulla [La Súper Trulla] # No. 3 – Discos Melón | TH Records
- 1980 – Pijuán – La Supertrulla [La Súper Trulla] # No. 2 – Discos Melón | TH Records
- 1979 – Pijuán – Emociones – vocals Hanibal – Discos Melón | TH Records
- 1978 – Pijuán – Salsa de Salón – Discos Melón
- 1978 – Puerto Rican Power – La Pura Naturaleza de la Salsa (produced by Pijuán) – Discos Melón
- 1977 – Pijuán – Merengues a Lo Pijuán – Discos Melón
- 1975 – Pijuán – La Supertrulla [La Súper Trulla] – Discos Melón All-Stars – Discos Melón
- 1974 – Pijuán – La Factoria de la Salsa – vocals Tony Guayama – Discos Melón
- 1973 – Pijuán – Un Chorrito de Pitorro – Discos Melón
- 1972 – Pijuán y su Sexteto – El Nuevo Album de Pijuán... – Discos Melón
- 1972 – Pijuán y su Sexteto – Mas Producción en Salsa Melódica – Discos REX SA (Discos Melón)
- 1971 – Pijuán y su Sexteto – Arráncame la Vida – Kubaney
- 1970 – Pijuán y su Sexteto – Ahora Es Cuando...É – Kubaney
- 1970 – Pijuán y su Sexteto – Ahora Sí – Kubaney
- 1970 – Pijuán (45 rpm) – La Maestranza (A) – La Piragua (B) – Kubaney K-5362 (two cuts from the 'Ahora Sí')
- 1969 – Pijuán y su Sexteto – Sabor a Pueblo – A Soul Full Latin Sound for 69 – Hit Parade
- 1968 – Pijuán y su Sexteto – Estamos en Todas – Groovy – Hit Parade
- 1967 – Pijuán y su Sexteto – Swing-A-Ling y Boogaloo – Phillips Borinquen
- 1966 – Pijuán y su Sexteto – En el Tradewinds ‘El Floron’ | Swing with the Tide at the Tradewinds – Phillips Borinquen

== See also ==
- List of Puerto Ricans
- Afro-Latin American
- El Gran Combo de Puerto Rico, a musical institution that has been around for 5 decades.
- Mongo Santamaría
- Charlie Palmieri
- Oscar D'León's musical career began with La Dimensión Latina in the early 1970s.
- Tata Güines
- Alfredo "Chocolate" Armenteros
- Ray Barretto
- Machito
- Celia Cruz's career did begin with La Sonora Matancera in the early 1950s.
- Salsa music
- Music of Puerto Rico
- Andy Montañez
- Xavier Serbiá
- Eddie Santiago
