= Charlotte Amalie Harbor =

Harbor in St. Thomas, U.S. Virgin Islands

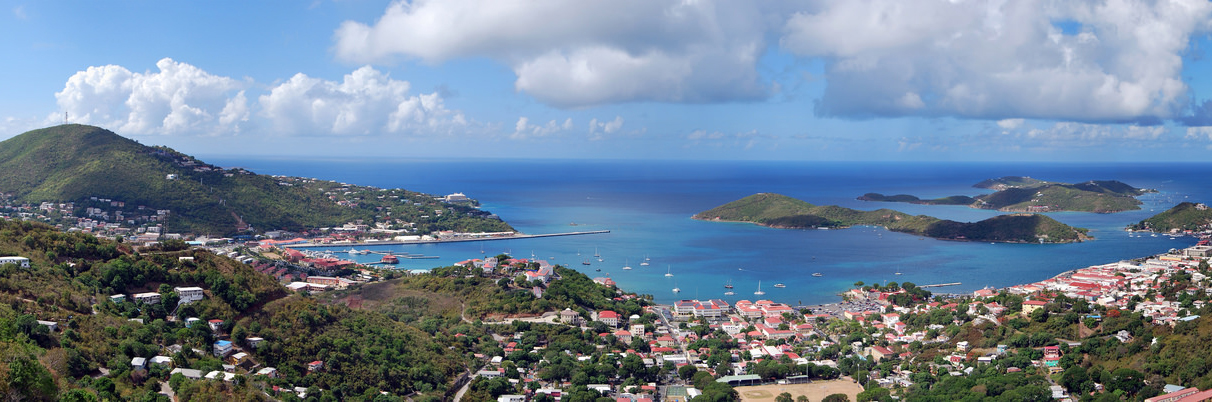
- Charlotte Amalie Harbor from Lookout Point on Skyline Drive (Route VI-40)
- Interactive map of Charlotte Amalie Harbor

Location
- Location: Charlotte Amalie, St. Thomas, U. S. Virgin Islands
- Coordinates: 18.33538°N 64.92806°W

Details
- Operated by: Virgin Islands Port Authority; West Indian Company Limited
- Draft depth: 10–40 feet
- Cruise Ports: 2

Statistics
- Website; Virgin Islands Port Authority; West Indian Company Limited

Charlotte Amalie Harbor is a major maritime hub located in the subdistrict of Charlotte Amalie, the modern day capital of the U.S. Virgin Islands, on the southern coast of St. Thomas. Renowned for its deep-water anchorage and strategic location in the Caribbean, the harbor plays a crucial role in regional tourism, trade, and transportation and military strategy. The harbor is the deepest natural harbor connected to the Anegada Passage (7,550 feet [2,300m]) and the Virgin Islands Basin (area between St. Thomas-St. John and St. Croix districts). The Anegada Passage and Virgin Islands Basin form the deepest channel leading into the Caribbean Basin from the Atlantic Ocean. Because the Charlotte Amalie harbor is the deepest natural connected to this channel, it made Charlotte Amalie a natural choice as a maritime hub and free port. As a free port, Charlotte Amalie has long served as a center for commerce, allowing duty-free trade that attracts businesses and visitors alike.

== History ==
Charlotte Amalie Harbor has been a key maritime hub since the 17th century, initially serving as an essential trading hub for European colonial powers. Under Danish rule, Charlotte Amalie grew into a thriving port, benefiting from its natural harbor and tax-free trading status. The harbor was used to ship stored goods such as sugar, molasses, rum, cotton, and other exports from the island's plantations prior to exporting from warehouses along Main Street (Dronningens Gade) and in the historic downtown area. These goods were shipped out of the harbor to Europe and North America. The harbor was also used to supply the same warehouses with imported items such as European textiles, ceramics, and household goods, as well as enslaved people from Africa for sale in the colony and the region.

During its colonial rule over the Danish West Indies, Denmark took several defensive measures to protect Charlotte Amalie Harbor, a critical economic and strategic asset. Given the harbor's significance as a trading hub and its vulnerability to pirate attacks, European naval conflicts, and potential invasions, the Danish and British governments constructed multiple fortifications and watchtowers to secure the harbor from both land and sea threats. These defenses included:

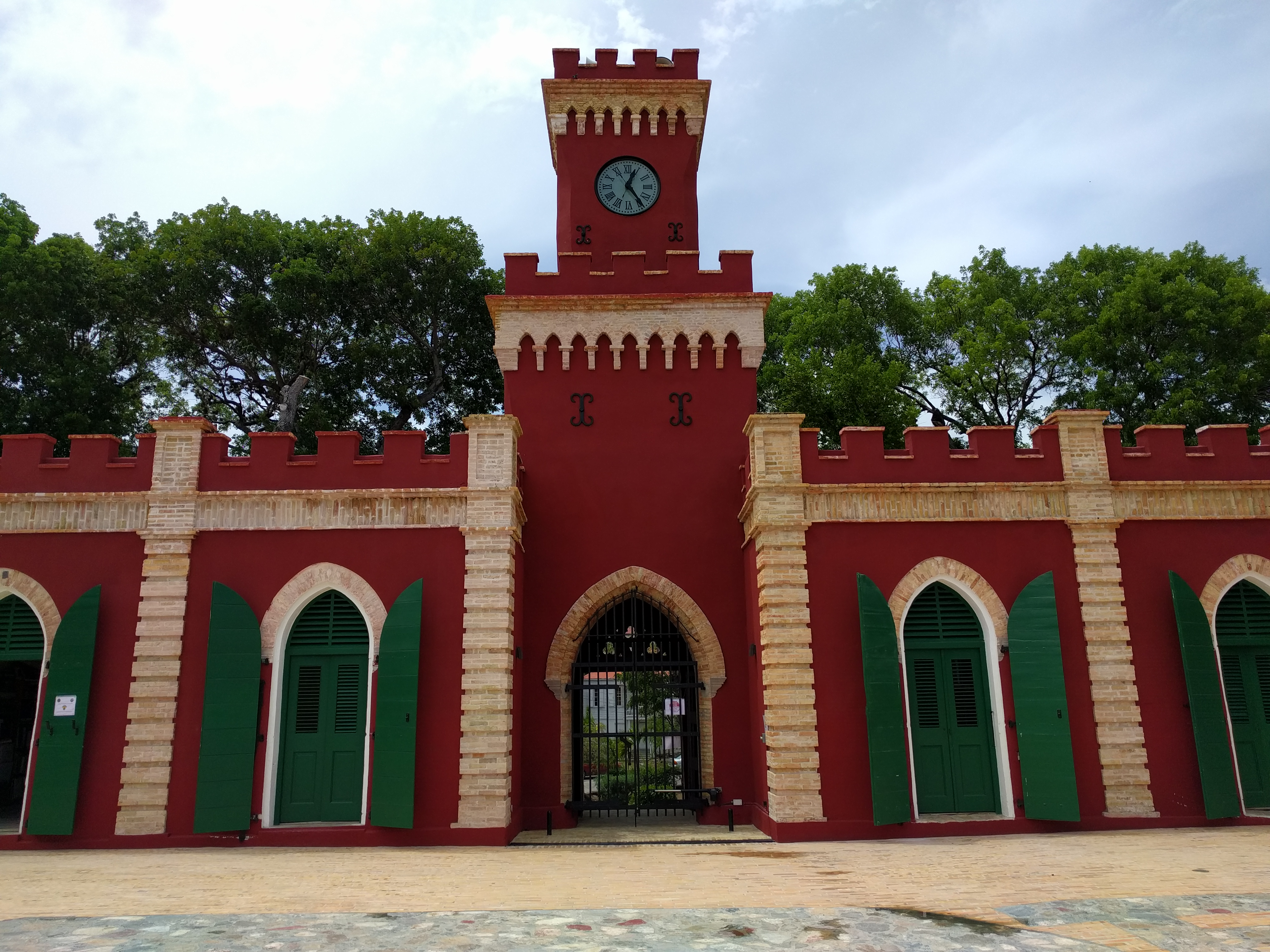
Fort Christian on St. Thomas

On St. Thomas

- Fort Christian - Built between 1672 and 1680 by the Danish, Fort Christian is the oldest standing structure in the U.S. Virgin Islands. The fort was originally constructed as the main defense structure to defend the Charlotte Amalie Harbor from pirates, European rival nations, and rebellious enslaved populations.

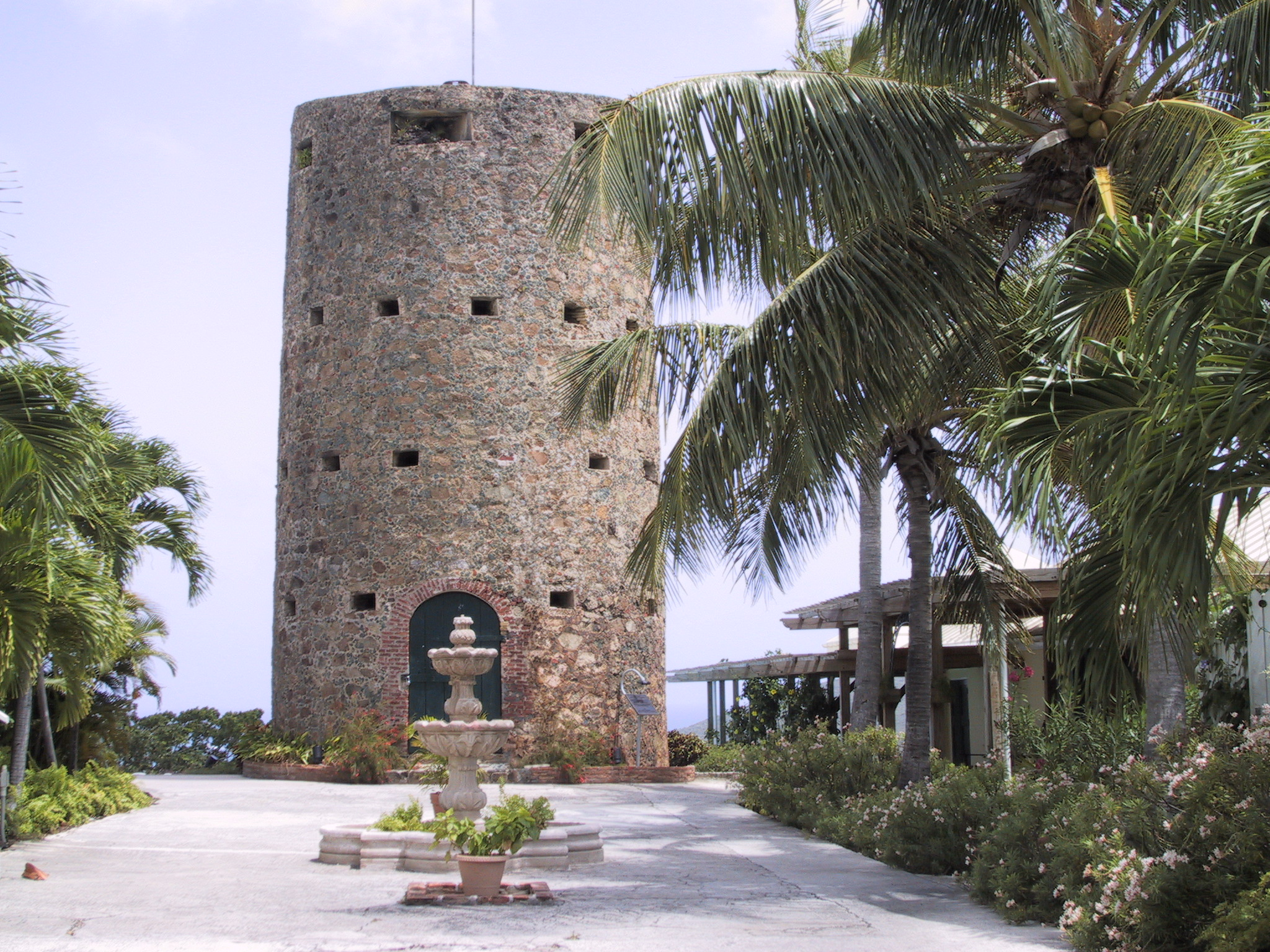
Blackbeard's Castle (Skytsborg Tower) on St. Thomas

- Blackbeard's Castle - Constructed by the Danish in 1679 on a hilltop overlooking Charlotte Amalie, this watchtower was originally named Skytsborg Tower ("Sky Tower" in Danish). It was a crucial lookout post for spotting enemy ships or pirate raids approaching the harbor.
- Bluebeard's Castle - A 17th-century Danish watchtower, located on a high vantage point in Charlotte Amalie. It was built by the Danish in 1688-1689 to monitor threats from the east. The tower was originally named "Frederik's Fort". It served as a fort until 1735.

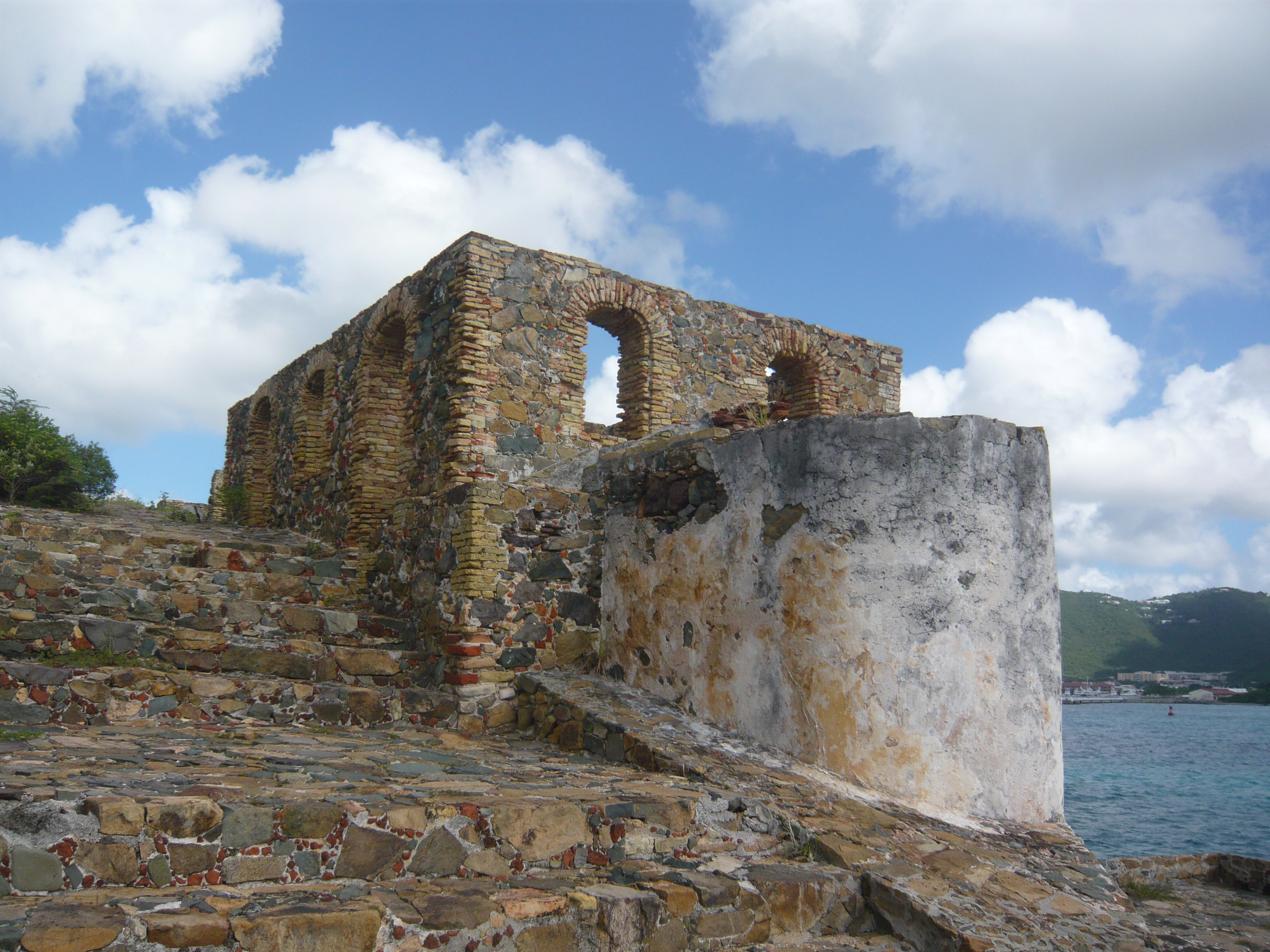
Fort Willoughby remains on Hassel Island

On Hassel Island

- Fort Willoughby - The fort was built in 1777–1780 by the Danish, who originally named it Prince Frederik's Battery. It provided additional cannon firepower to protect the harbor.
- Crowell Battery - It was constructed by the British during their occupation of St. Thomas from 1801 to 1802. Named after British officer John Clayton Cowell, who served as Governor of St. Thomas during this period, the battery was strategically positioned to control the entrance to Charlotte Amalie Harbor. The British took control of the Danish West Indies twice—first from 1801 to 1802, and again from 1807 to 1815—during the Napoleonic Wars to prevent Denmark from allying with France and to secure key Caribbean trade routes.

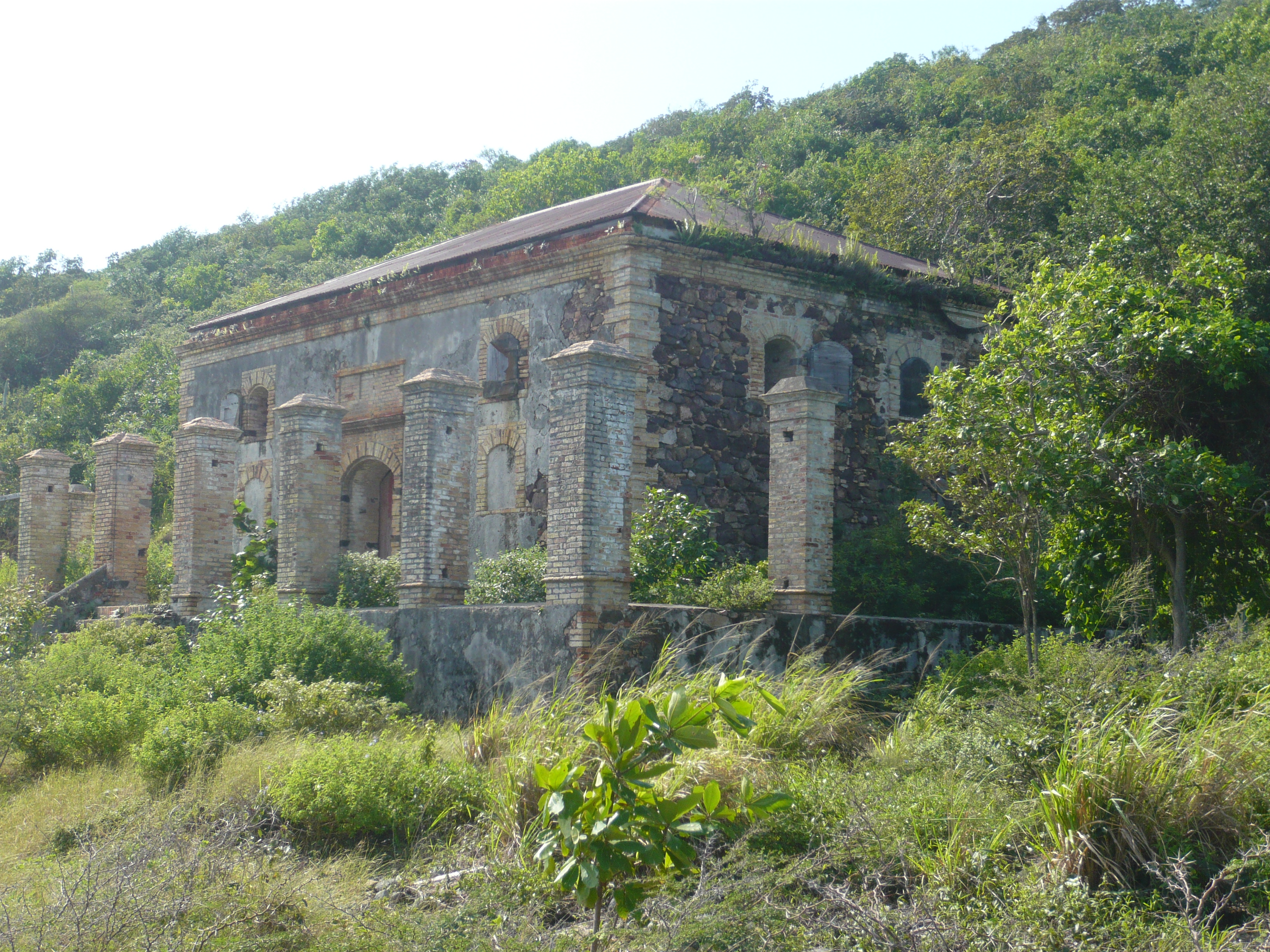
Fort Willoughby Garrison House on Hassel Island

- Shipley's Battery - In 1801, the British began their occupation of the Danish West Indies during the French Revolutionary War. Lt. General Thomas Trigge ordered forces to fortify Hassel Island for the occupation. Lt. Col. Charles Shipley planned the new defensive constructions necessary for the occupation. Shipley's Battery was built to commanded the western approaches via the Gregerie Channel in the Charlotte Amalie Harbor.

In 1917, the United States purchased the Danish West Indies—now the U.S. Virgin Islands—for $25 million in gold. While economic benefits were considered (specifically keeping a major shipping lane in the Caribbean open), the primary motivation for the purchase was strategic military purposes, particularly to prevent Germany from using the islands and particularly Charlotte Amalie Harbor, as a naval base during World War I. The harbor subsequently played a major role in American naval operations and defense strategies in the Caribbean as the United States established and maintained a naval submarine base at the western end of Charlotte Amalie Harbor (now Crown Bay) between 1917 and 1950. The submarine base was established as a first line of defense for the Panama Canal against possible German submarine entering the Caribbean basin from the Atlantic Ocean.

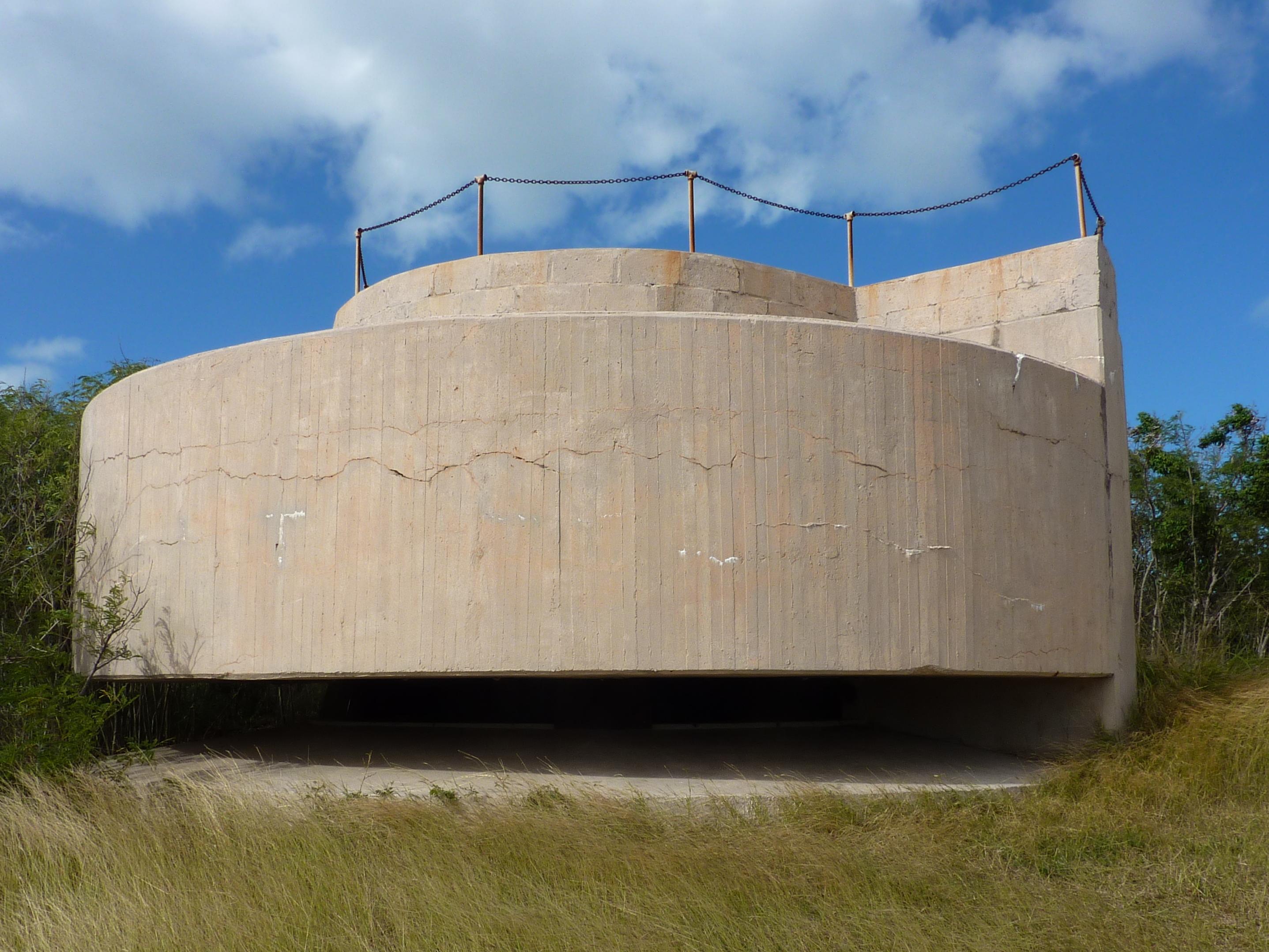
Fort Segarra on Water Island

The United States also attempted to fortify the Charlotte Amalie Harbor. Fort Segarra is an unfinished U.S. military installation located on Water Island, which is situated at the entrance to Charlotte Amalie Harbor in St. Thomas, U.S. Virgin Islands. It was part of the United States' coastal defense strategy during World War II and was intended to fortify Charlotte Amalie Harbor against potential Axis naval or aerial threats.

Harbor Transformation and the Creation of Hassel Island

In the mid-19th century, the Danish government undertook significant modifications to Charlotte Amalie Harbor to enhance maritime navigation and water circulation. A pivotal change involved severing the narrow isthmus that connected the landmass—then known as Orkanhullet (Hurricane Hole in English)—to Saint Thomas, thereby creating what is now known as Hassel Island. This alteration, completed around 1865, was part of broader harbor improvements, including dredging, aimed at accommodating larger steamships and improving harbor conditions.

The creation of the channel, known as the Haulover Cut, allowed small vessels with drafts under six feet to pass directly between the main harbor and the western approaches, notably the West Gregerie Channel. This not only facilitated maritime traffic but also improved water flow, helping to mitigate the accumulation of debris within the harbor.

Subsequent enhancements, including the deepening of the channel after the United States acquired the Virgin Islands in 1917, further integrated the East and West Gregerie Channels into the harbor's navigational system, effectively expanding its navigable waters and solidifying its status as a key maritime hub in the Caribbean.

== Facilities ==
WICO Dock in Charlotte Amalie East

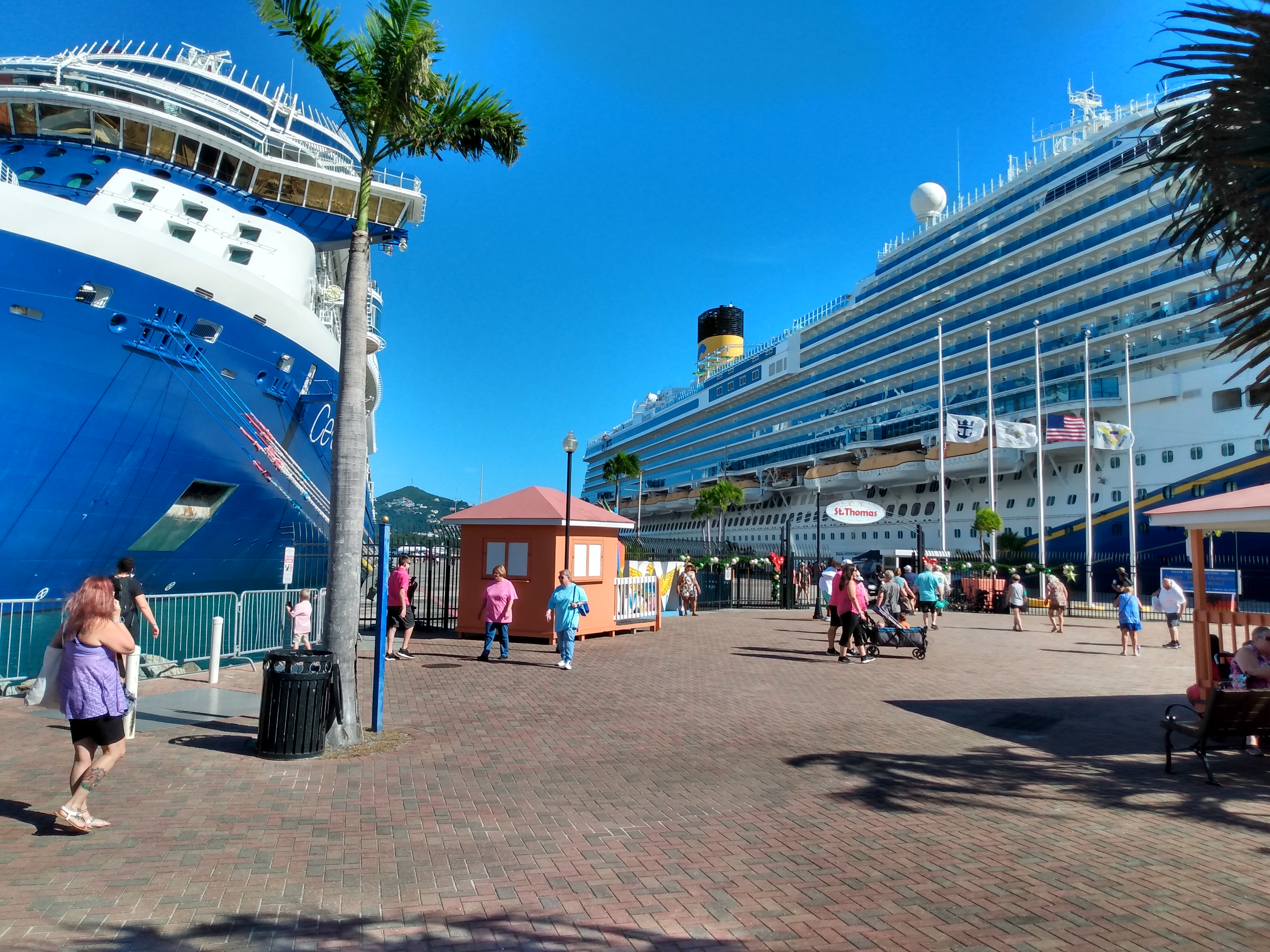
Crown Bay Cruise Port in Charlotte Amalie West

Passenger and cruise facilities

Charlotte Amalie Harbor encompasses several key facilities designed to accommodate commercial, passenger, and security vessels including two cruise facilities that together are the St. Thomas cruise port:

- West Indian Company Dock (WICO): Located in Charlotte Amalie East, this dock can accommodate up to three large cruise ships simultaneously. It is adjacent to Havensight Mall, a major shopping area catering to cruise passengers.
- Crown Bay Cruise Port: Situated west of downtown in Charlotte Amalie West, this facility is capable of handling larger vessels, including those unable to dock at WICO. The port area includes retail outlets, restaurants, and passenger services.
- Wilmoth Blyden Marine Terminal: Serving as a key ferry terminal, this facility provides connections between St. Thomas, St. Croix, and the British Virgin Islands. Located on the Charlotte Amalie waterfront, it accommodates both public and private ferry operators.

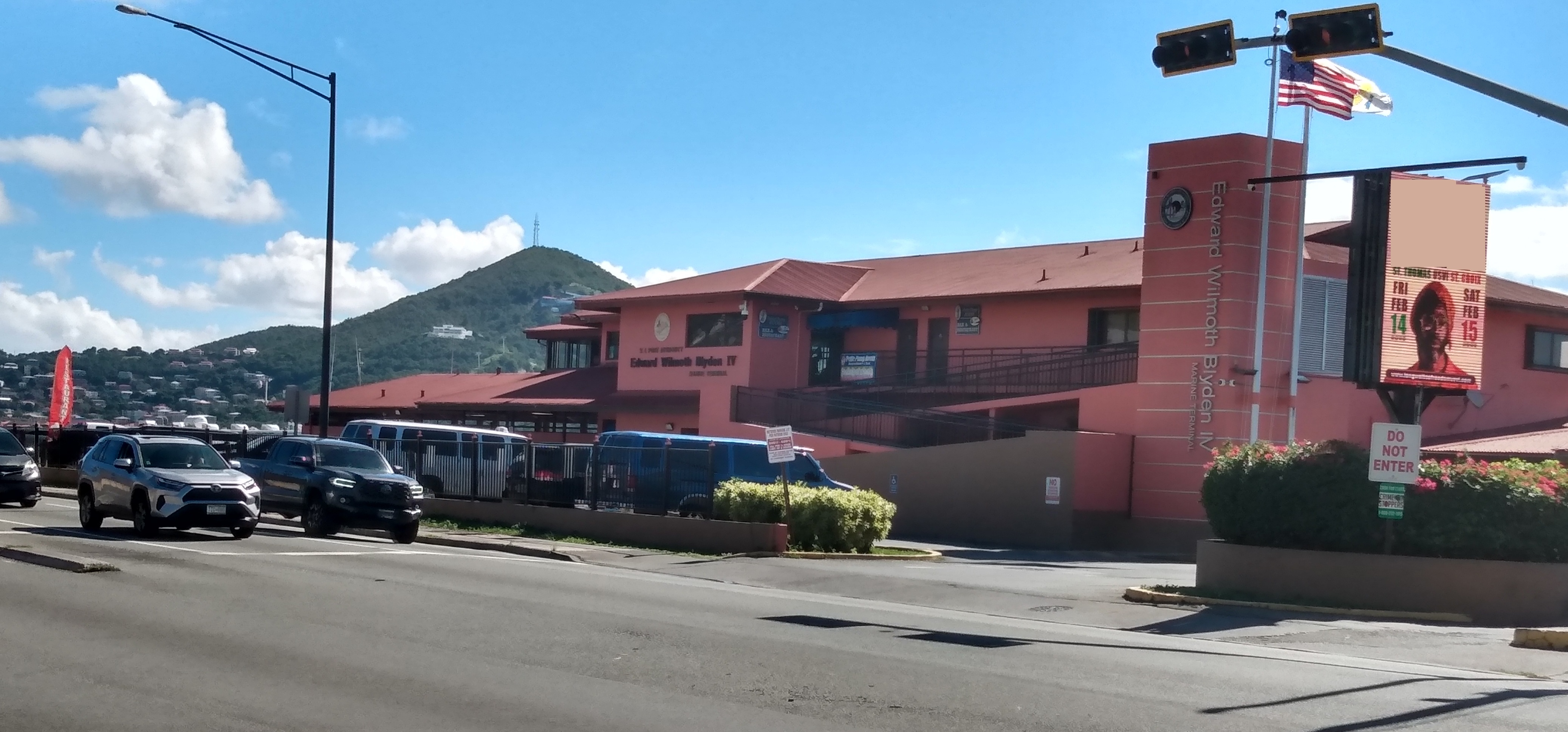
Edward Wilmoth Blyden Marine Terminal in Charlotte Amalie

Cargo and commercial facilities

- Crown Bay Container Port: A major cargo-handling facility, Crown Bay Container Port serves as a vital point for importing goods into the U.S. Virgin Islands. It supports containerized cargo operations and is managed by the Virgin Islands Port Authority (VIPA).

Marina facilities

- Yacht Haven Grande: A marina facility that accommodates luxury yachts and smaller vessels, offering upscale amenities and services.
- Crown Bay Marina: Adjacent to the container port, Crown Bay Marina is a private marina that caters to recreational and commercial vessels, including luxury yachts and charter boats. The marina features docking facilities, fueling stations, and marine service providers. In addition, the marina has ferry docks for both passengers heading to St. John and Water Island.

U.S. Armed Forces facility

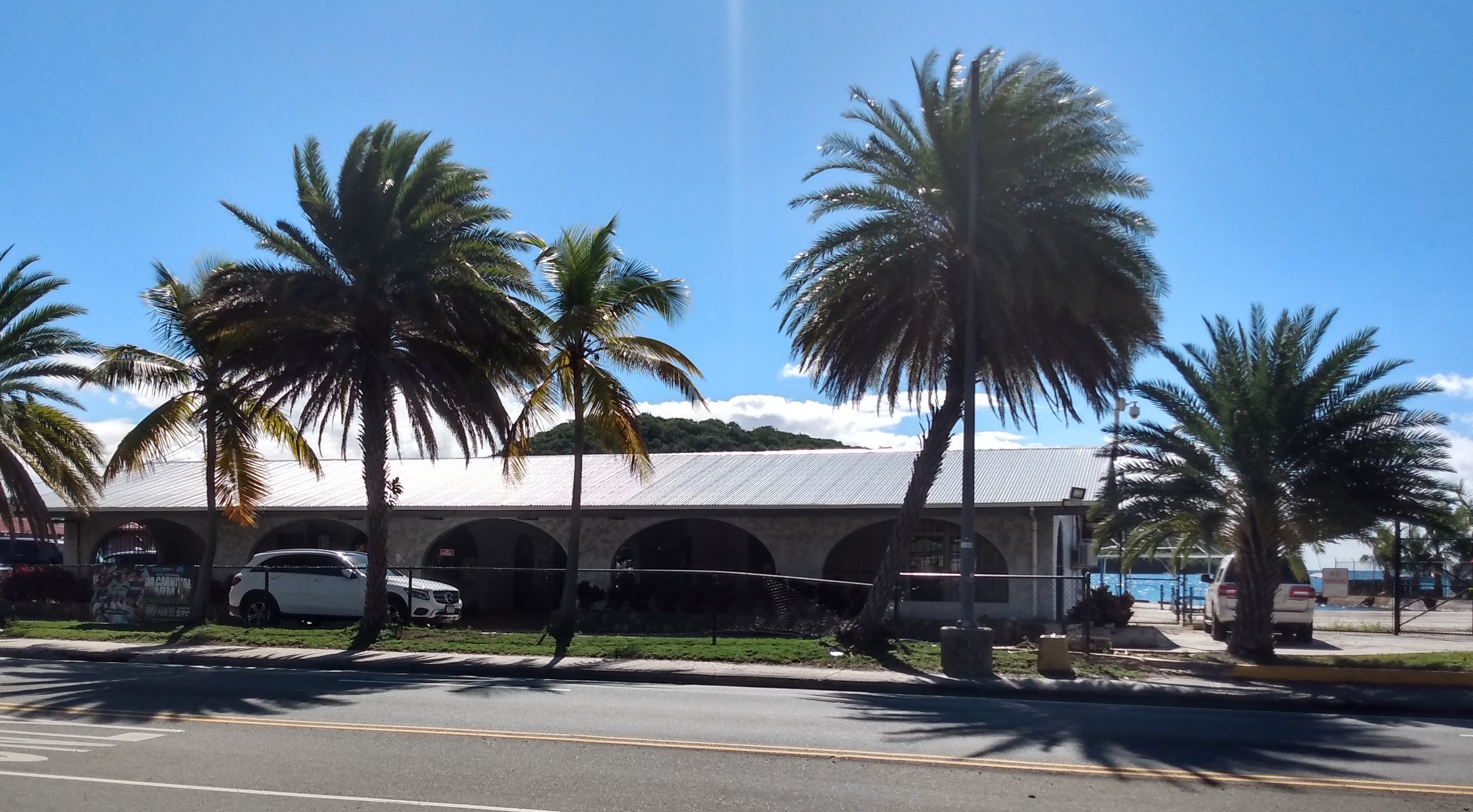
The Charlotte Amalie Harbor Seaplane Base Terminal

- U.S. Coast Guard Facility: The U.S. Coast Guard Sector San Juan oversees operations in the U.S. Virgin Islands, with personnel stationed in Charlotte Amalie Harbor to support maritime security, law enforcement, and search-and-rescue operations. The facility in Charlotte Amalie Harbor is used for patrol boat operations, port security, and coordination of maritime safety efforts in the region.

Other Maritime Facilities

- The Charlotte Amalie Harbor Seaplane Base Terminal: The harbor also includes a seaplane terminal, offering scheduled seaplane services between St. Thomas and St. Croix. This facility supports air-sea connectivity, particularly for inter-island business and government travel.

== Economic impact ==
Charlotte Amalie Harbor is a major driver of the U.S. Virgin Islands economy, particularly through tourism, cargo imports, and duty-free trade. The free port status encourages commerce, while the cruise and ferry terminals contribute significantly to local businesses. The Crown Bay Container Port plays a crucial role in the importation of goods, supporting both commercial and residential needs in the St. Thomas-St. John district.

The cruise ports of the harbor form one of the busiest cruise destinations in the Caribbean. In 2023, the "Port of St. Thomas" ranked as the 13th busiest singular location* cruise port by passenger traffic in the world. It was the 5th busiest cruise port in the United States behind only Port of Miami, Port Canaveral, Port Everglades and Port of Galveston. It was 3rd busiest in the Caribbean Basin behind only Cozumel and George Town. The St. Thomas cruise port was the 3rd busiest singular location* in the West Indies behind Nassau and George Town.

Note: *Freeport and the Out Islands (combined and classified as a single port) is ahead of the St. Thomas cruise port but grouped cruise port is a collection of locations on different islands in the Bahamas, not including New Providence (Nassau).

== Transportation and accessibility ==
The harbor's proximity to Cyril E. King Airport enhances accessibility for travelers. Many passengers from St. John, Water Island, and the British Virgin Islands use the harbor facilities to access Cyril E. King Airport. Various transportation options, including taxis and buses, connect the harbor to destinations across St. Thomas.
