= Swift Rapids Marine Railway =

Swift Rapids Lock 43 (formerly Swift Rapids Marine Railway)
- Interactive map of Swift Rapids Lock 43 (formerly Swift Rapids Marine Railway)
- 44.8565861°N 79.5394955°W
- Waterway: Trent-Severn Waterway
- Country: Canada
- Maintained by: Parks Canada
- Operation: Patent slip (1919-1964) chambered lock (1964-present)
- First built: 1919
- Latest built: 1964 (railway patent slip replaced)
- Length: 36.6 m (120.1 ft)
- Width: 9.7 m (31.8 ft)
- Fall: 47 m (154.2 ft)

Swift Rapids Marine Railway was one of two patent slips used on the Trent-Severn Waterway using the same plan design. Built in 1919 as temporary solution by Orillia Water Light and Power Commission next to their hydro dam (the slip foundation was a lock) and was later staffed by two operators from Transport Canada and replaced in 1964 by the Giant Lock to take vessels up and down the 47 m (154.2 ft) difference. It is located in Swift Rapids, a community within the township of Severn, Ontario.

Unlike Big Chute, Swift Rapids was only accessed via water when it was operational and did not become a tourist attraction. Nowadays it is accessible from Swift Rapids Road, which is used by railway staff and service vehicles from Parks Canada and Orillia Power. Houses built to house power station staff are mostly unused (two in use by lock master and power station operator), the school closed in 1960, and the general store/post office in 1985.
