= Big Chute Marine Railway =

Patent slip in Ontario, Canada

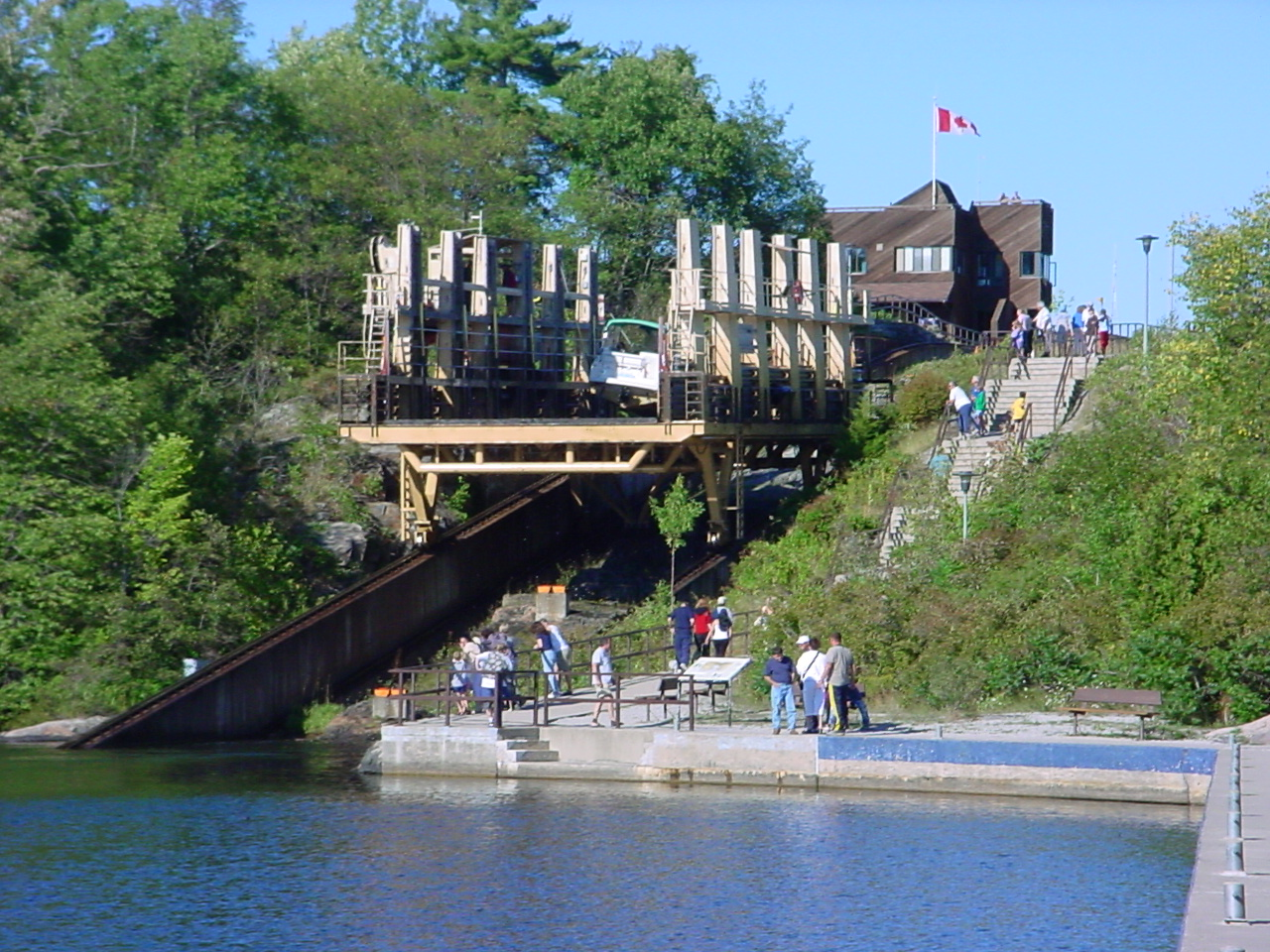
- Big Chute Marine Railway
- Interactive map of Big Chute Marine Railway
- 44.884722°N 79.674139°W
- Waterway: Trent-Severn Waterway
- Country: Canada
- Maintained by: Parks Canada
- Operation: Patent slip
- First built: 1917
- Latest built: 1978
- Fall: 18 m (59.1 ft)

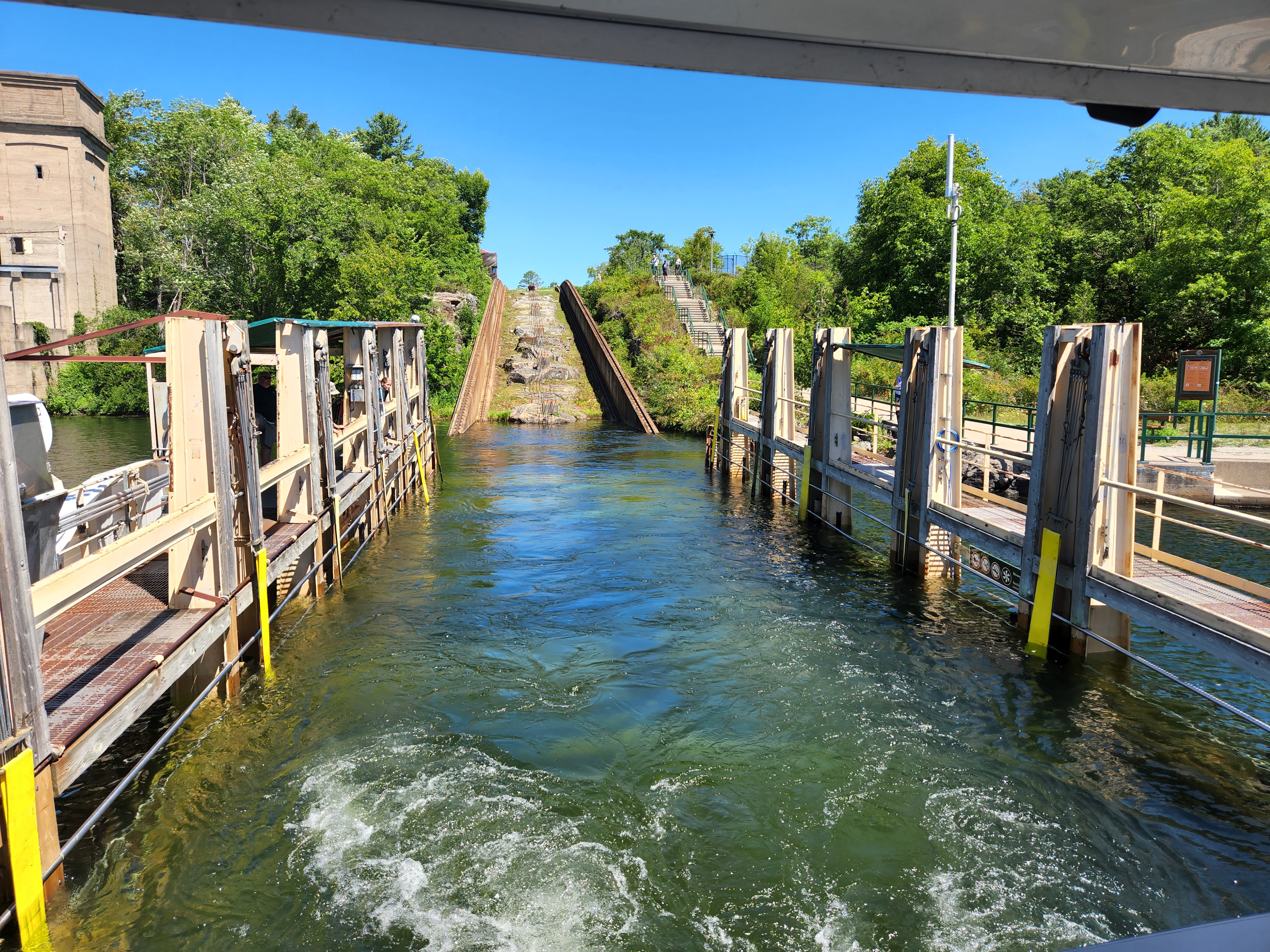
View from a vessel exiting the submerged carriage

Big Chute Marine Railway is a patent slip at lock 44 of the Trent-Severn Waterway in the township of Georgian Bay, Ontario, Canada. It works on an inclined plane to carry boats in individual cradles over a change of height of about 60 feet (18 m). It is the only marine railway (or canal inclined plane) of its kind in North America still in use, and is overseen by federally operated Parks Canada. This railway is vital for those cruising the 6,000-mile (9,700 km) Great Loop route.

== History ==
In 1914, contracts were let to have 3 locks built to connect the Severn River to Georgian Bay at Port Severn, Big Chute, and Swift Rapids. With the start of World War I, however, there was a shortage of manpower and resources. Lock 45 at Port Severn was nearing completion, so it was finished as a small, "temporary" lock, which has remained in use to this day. The locks at Big Chute and Swift Rapids were not completed, with temporary marine railways being built instead. The original Big Chute Marine Railway was completed in 1917, and could only carry boats up to 35 feet (10.67 m) long, preventing navigation by large commercial vessels. The Swift Rapids Marine Railway was completed in 1919, using the same plans as the Big Chute railway.

In 1921, plans were once again made to build three locks at Big Chute, to be part of a new section of canal which would take boats from Big Chute and rejoin the existing waterway downstream from the Little Chute, avoiding the fast water in the Little Chute. However because of the post-war recession the scheme was put on hold once more, although remains of the beginning of the dams required to maintain the water levels can still be found in the surrounding forest. In 1923, the original railway at Big Chute was replaced, as the size and number of boats had increased, with the second carriage being able to carry boats up to 60 feet (18.29 m) long. The 1923 carriage was used up until around 2003, on days of extremely heavy traffic, or as a backup for the new carriage. Although the old carriage is no longer used, it remains on display.

In the 1960s, surveys of the area were done yet again. The Swift Rapids Marine Railway was replaced with a single conventional lock in 1964, and plans were made for a single lock at Big Chute.

Before construction began the sea lamprey, which had been devastating the fishing industry in the Great Lakes, was found in Gloucester Pool—at the bottom of the railway—and plans were put on hold. Several impractical ideas were suggested, but no practical solution could be found. By the end of the 1960s, the old marine railway could not keep up with the amount of boating traffic in the area. Long lines formed at either end of the railway, with waits often being overnight. Research was done to find a way to prevent the migration of the sea lamprey into Lake Couchiching and Lake Simcoe, while still effectively increasing the flow of traffic. A biologist sat at the bottom of the railway for days, checking the bottom of boats that locked through, and finally saw a lamprey attached to the bottom of a boat. The lamprey fell off after less than 6 meters, so the railway was determined to be effective at preventing the sea lamprey's migration. In 1976, it was finally decided that a new, enlarged railway would be built. The current carriage was opened to the public in 1978, and can carry a boat up to 100 feet (30.48 m) long and 24 feet (7.32 m) beam. It cost $3 million to build .

== Operation ==
The vessels are floated into the cradle, which is approximately 80 feet (24.38 m) long by 26 feet (7.92 m) wide. Four 200 horsepower (150 kW) electric motors provide traction by cable. It can transport up to a combined total of 100 short tons (91 t; 89 long tons) in weight. In this enlarged version the increased weight is borne on a dual track which keeps the carriage level (the front and back wheels are on different tracks, with the front of the carriage on the upper tracks. The carriage is kept horizontal due to the relative profile of the tracks. Toward the end of travel, the carriage assumes a slight "nose down" attitude as it submerges into the water. Boats rest on the bottom of the carriage, and webbing slings are provided to support boats safely and prevent them from tipping. The old system has been decommissioned by Parks Canada, to conform with modern safety standards, although the old tracks and carriage still remain. The last operation of the old system was in 2003.

== Big Chute Generating Station ==
The marine railway is located next to Big Chute Generating Station, which was built between 1909 and 1911 by the Simcoe Railway and Power Company. It was the first generating station purchased by the Hydro-Electric Power Commission of Ontario, later renamed Ontario Hydro, and originally had a capacity of 2160 kilowatts. Currently owned by Ontario Power Generation, the station now has one unit with a maximum capacity of ten megawatts.
