= Hassel Island, U.S. Virgin Islands =

- Hassel Island Historic District
- U.S. National Register of Historic Places
- U.S. Historic district
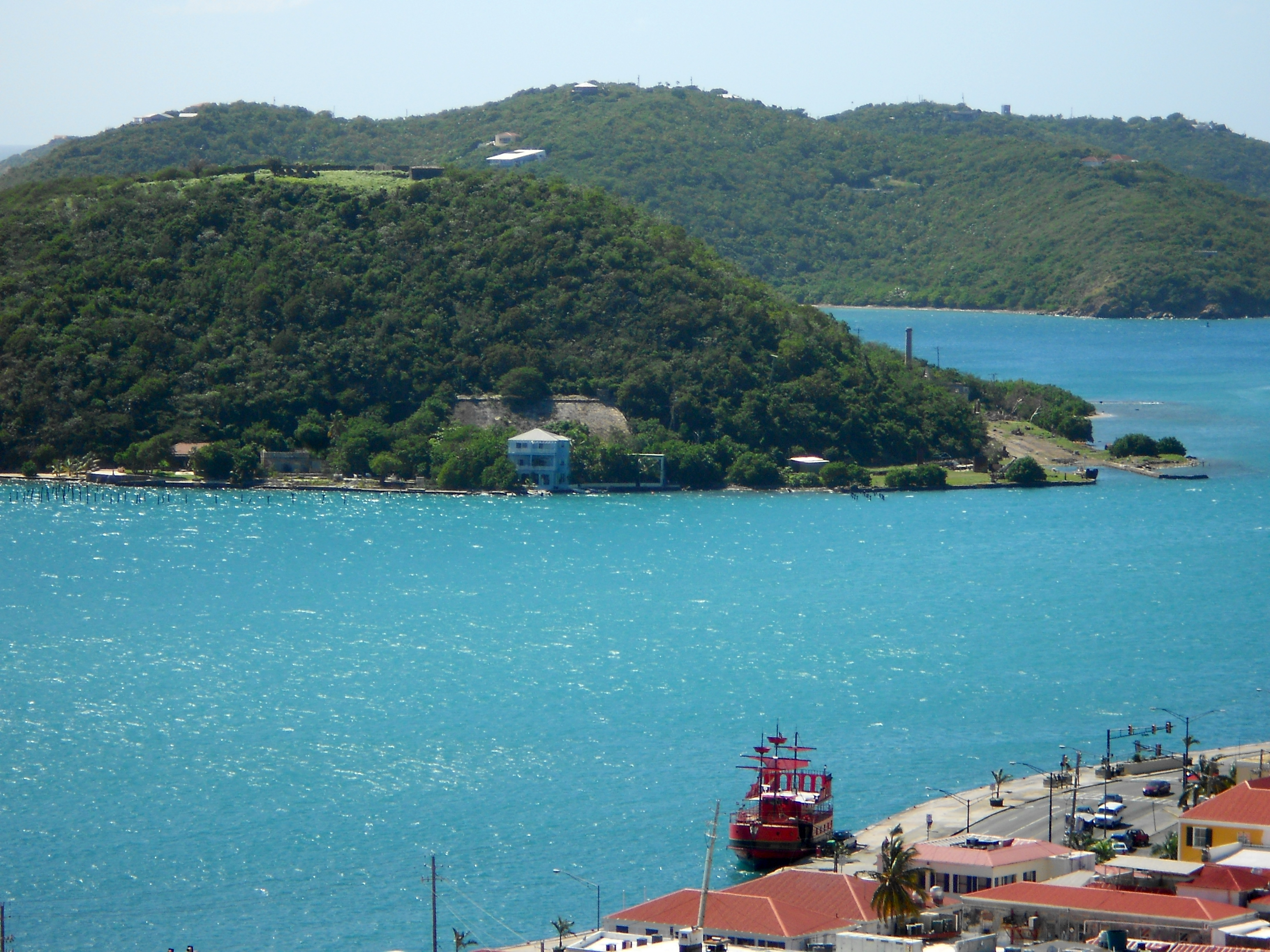

- Location within the U.S. Virgin Islands
- Nearest city: Charlotte Amalie
- Coordinates: 18°19′44″N 64°56′0″W
- Area: 48 acres (19 ha)
- Built: 1801
- Architect: Lt. Col. Charles Shipley
- NRHP reference No.: 76001862 (original); 78003093 (increase)

Significant dates
- Added to NRHP: July 19, 1976
- Boundary increase: August 29, 1978

Hassel Island (also sometimes Hassell Island) is a small island of the U.S. Virgin Islands, a United States territory located in the Caribbean Sea. Hassel Island lies in the Charlotte Amalie Harbor just south of Saint Thomas and east of Water Island, with which it is part of the sub-district of Water Island.

The roughly 136-acre (550,000 m^{2}) island was once a peninsula of Saint Thomas, known as Orkanhullet (Hurricane Hole). Hassel Island was separated by the Danish government in 1860, and named for the Hassel family who owned much of the estate.

In March 2012, the MTV's reality TV series The Real World was filmed for its twenty-seventh season on Hassel Island. The series was filmed at the Royal Mail Building, which was the former quarters of the Royal Mail Steam Packet Company. During the late 1900s, it was operated as the Royal Mail Inn. It is the only season that the television series has filmed in the Caribbean. The season completed its filming two months later in May 2012. In 2015, that land was purchased to be used as a private home. There are under five homes built on this island. It does not seem to be a fast growing populous place, but rather is a more secluded National Park and limited number of private homes.

== History ==
Careening Cove, a bay on Hassel Island, appears on maps as early as 1687.

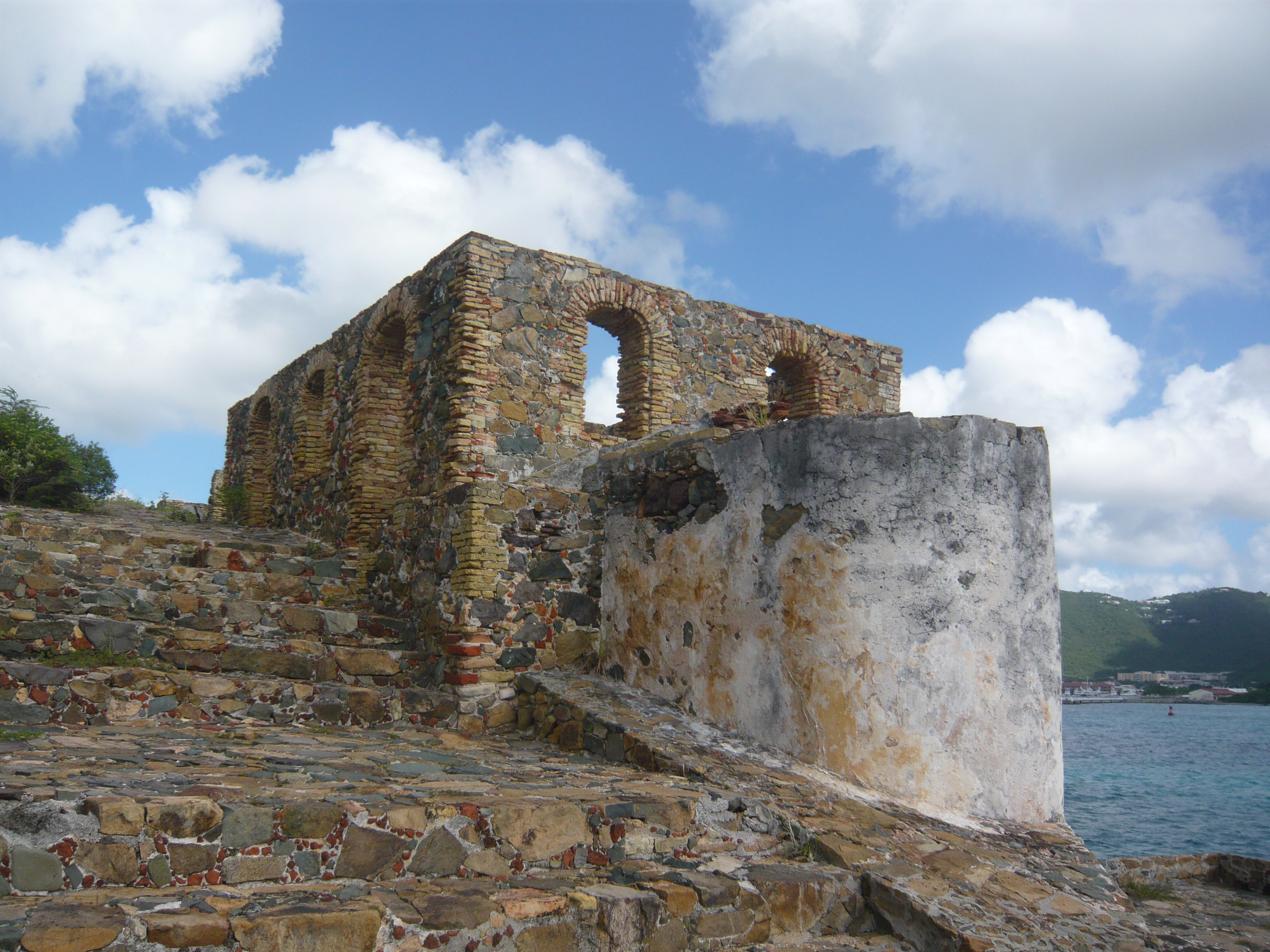
Fort Willoughby, Hassel Island

The Danish used Hassel Island's strategic location to defend the busy Charlotte Amalie harbor in the 18th and 19th centuries.

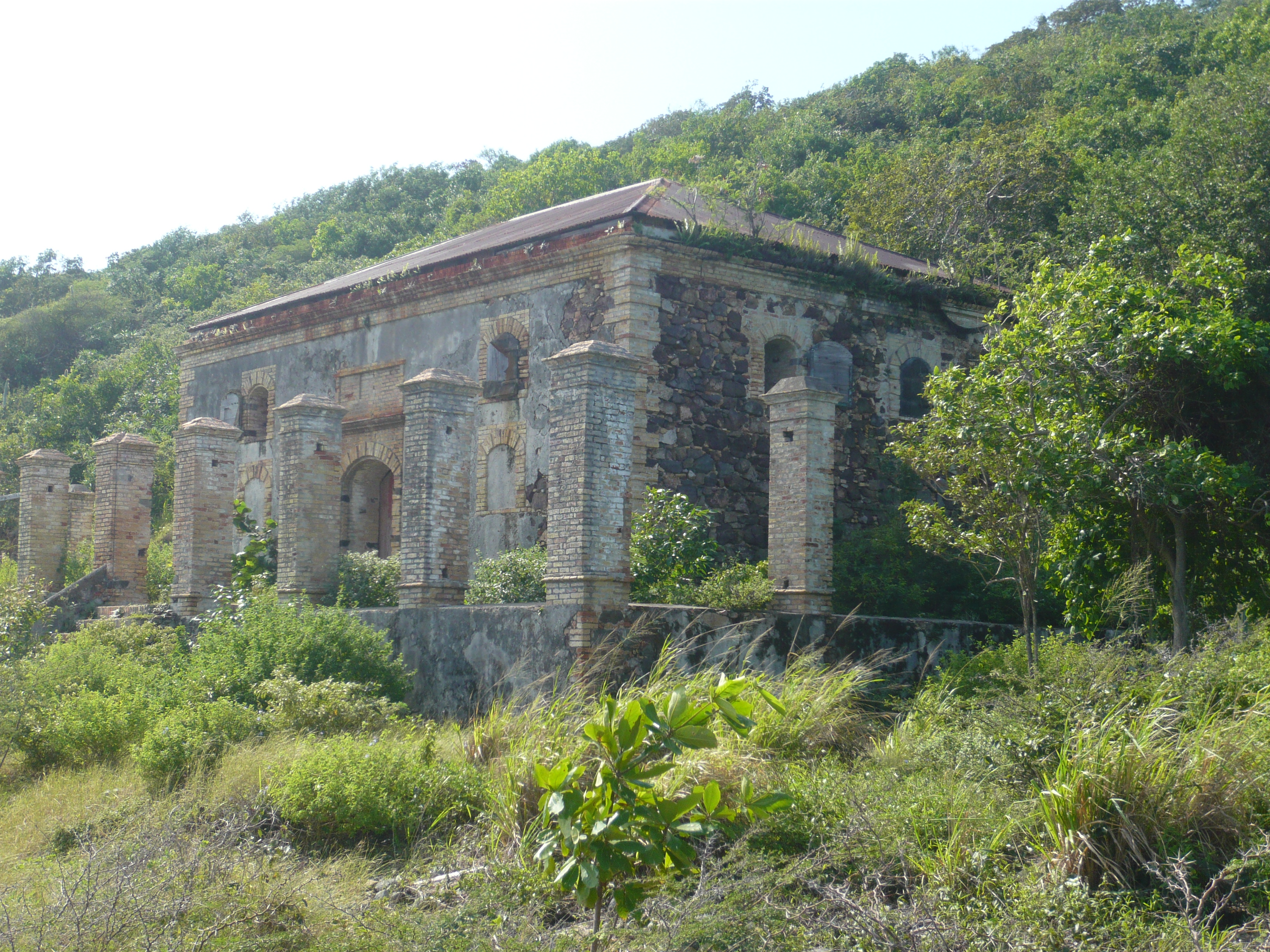
Fort Willoughby Garrison House, Hassel Island

The British occupied Hassel Island during the Napoleonic Wars. The ruins of several British buildings remain on Hassel Island, including Fort Willoughby, which was built on the site of the older Prince Frederik's Battery (Fort Frederik), as well as Fort Shipley (Shipley's Battery) and Cowell's Battery. All three were constructed around 1801-1802.

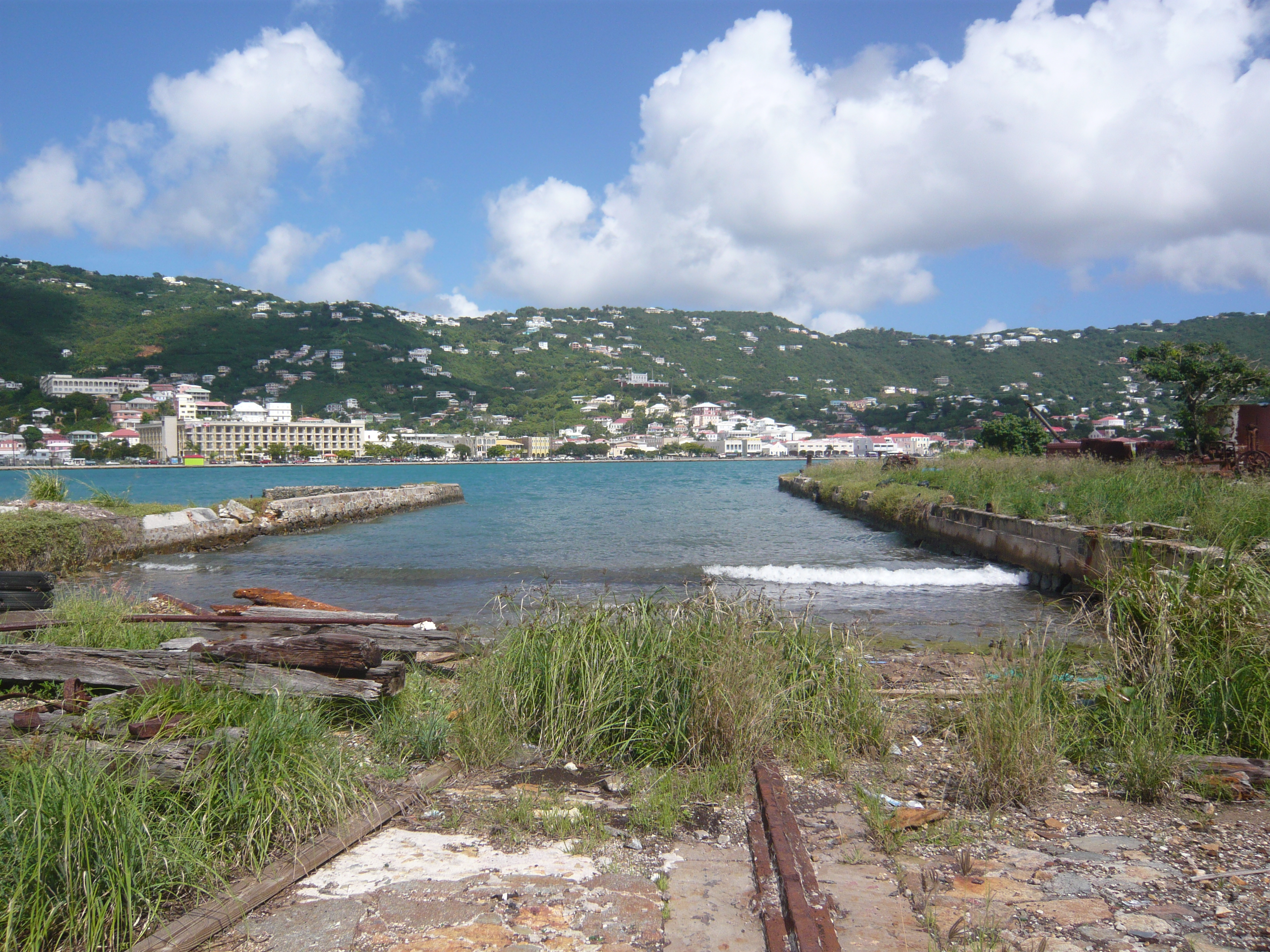
Creque Marine Railway, Hassel Island

In the 1840s, the St. Thomas Marine Railway Company constructed the St. Thomas Marine Railway Slip. Later renamed the Creque Marine Railway, it is one of the earliest steam-powered marine railways in the western hemisphere and perhaps the oldest surviving example of such a railway. The Hamburg-based Boulton Company built the railway's steam engine.

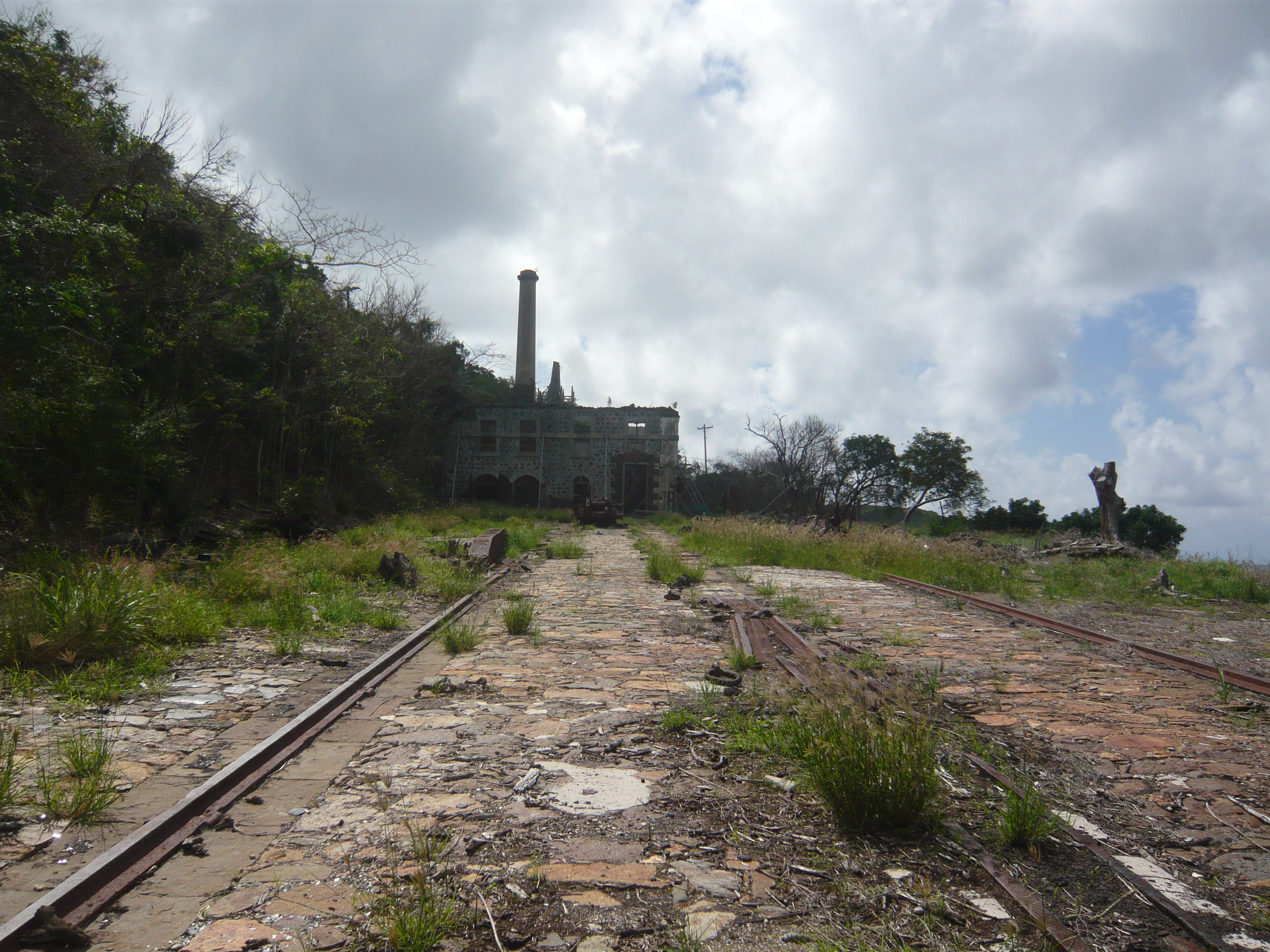
Creque Marine Railway Power House, Hassel Island

In the 1860s, the Danish government dug a channel that separated Hassel Island from Saint Thomas and improved the circulation of the Charlotte Amalie harbor.

The Royal Mail Steam Packet Company operated its West Indies hub on Hassel Island from about 1850 until the 1870s.

In 1871, the Hamburg America Line set up a coaling station on Hassel Island.

There was also a leprosarium on the island.

The channel was widened by the United States Army Corps of Engineers in 1919, shortly after the United States purchased the Danish West Indies. The United States Navy also established a naval station on the island, which was in operation during World War I and World War II.

In the middle of the 20th century, most of Hassel Island was owned by the prominent local Paiewonsky family. The Royal Mail Inn, a small hotel located on Hassel Island, built by the Paiewonsky family may have been the hotel immortalized in Herman Wouk's novel Don't Stop the Carnival.

The Creque Marine Railway and a signal station at Cowell's Battery were in operation until the 1960s and 1970s, respectively.

The southern portion of the island was inscribed as a historic district on the National Register of Historic Places in 1976. In 1978, the historic district was expanded to cover the remainder of the island as well.

In 1978, the Virgin Islands National Park purchased most of the island from the Paiewonsky family. The rest of the island is divided between the territorial government and a few private residences.

Since around 2004, the Saint Thomas and Hassel Island Preservation Trust, the Virgin Islands National Park, the Saint Thomas Historical Trust and other organizations have been working to restore and preserve the island's historic sites. There are limited guided kayaking and hiking tours of the island.

Hassel Island is also the location for The Real World: St. Thomas, the twenty-seventh season of the reality show The Real World.
