= Saint Thomas Historical Trust =

- Formation: 1966; 60 years ago
- Type: Non-profit historic preservation organization
- Purpose: To preserve the cultural and historical heritage of Saint Thomas, through education, advocacy, and preservation promotion
- Headquarters: 5332 Raadets Gade, Charlotte Amalie, St Thomas, VI 00802
- Location: Saint Thomas, United States Virgin Islands
- Website: Official Saint Thomas Historical Trust website

St Thomas Historical Trust (also Saint Thomas Historical Trust), is a non-profit historic preservation organization located on Saint Thomas island, in the United States Virgin Islands.

== Programs ==
The Trust's headquarters and history museum are located at 5332 Raadets Gade (Council's Street) of Charlotte Amalie on St. Thomas. The Trust works to preserve the cultural and historical heritage of Saint Thomas, through education, advocacy, and preservation promotion.

It has an ongoing program of historical and cultural events, including lectures, walking tours, practical projects and activities for children. It also organises initiatives to celebrate traditions of the islanders and raises funds for future preservation work.

== History ==
The Trust was established in 1966 as a non-profit organization. Early projects included involvement in the archeological site on Tutu island.

The Trust has since been involved in numerous preservation, restoration, and outreach projects, including the Hassel Island Historic District on Hassel Island, the Bred Gade step streets of Charlotte Amalie, and the Danish colonial Fort Christian.

== See also ==
- History of the United States Virgin Islands topics
- Danish West Indies topics
