= Creque Marine Railway =

Inclined-plane ship railway on Hassel Island

Coordinates: 18.3356°N 64.9377°W

The Creque Marine Railway, formerly the "St Thomas Marine Repair Facility", is an inclined-plane ship railway on Hassel Island, in the bay of Charlotte Amalie off the coast of St. Thomas Island, in the U.S. Virgin Islands. Its site is below Fort Shipley, within Virgin Islands National Park.

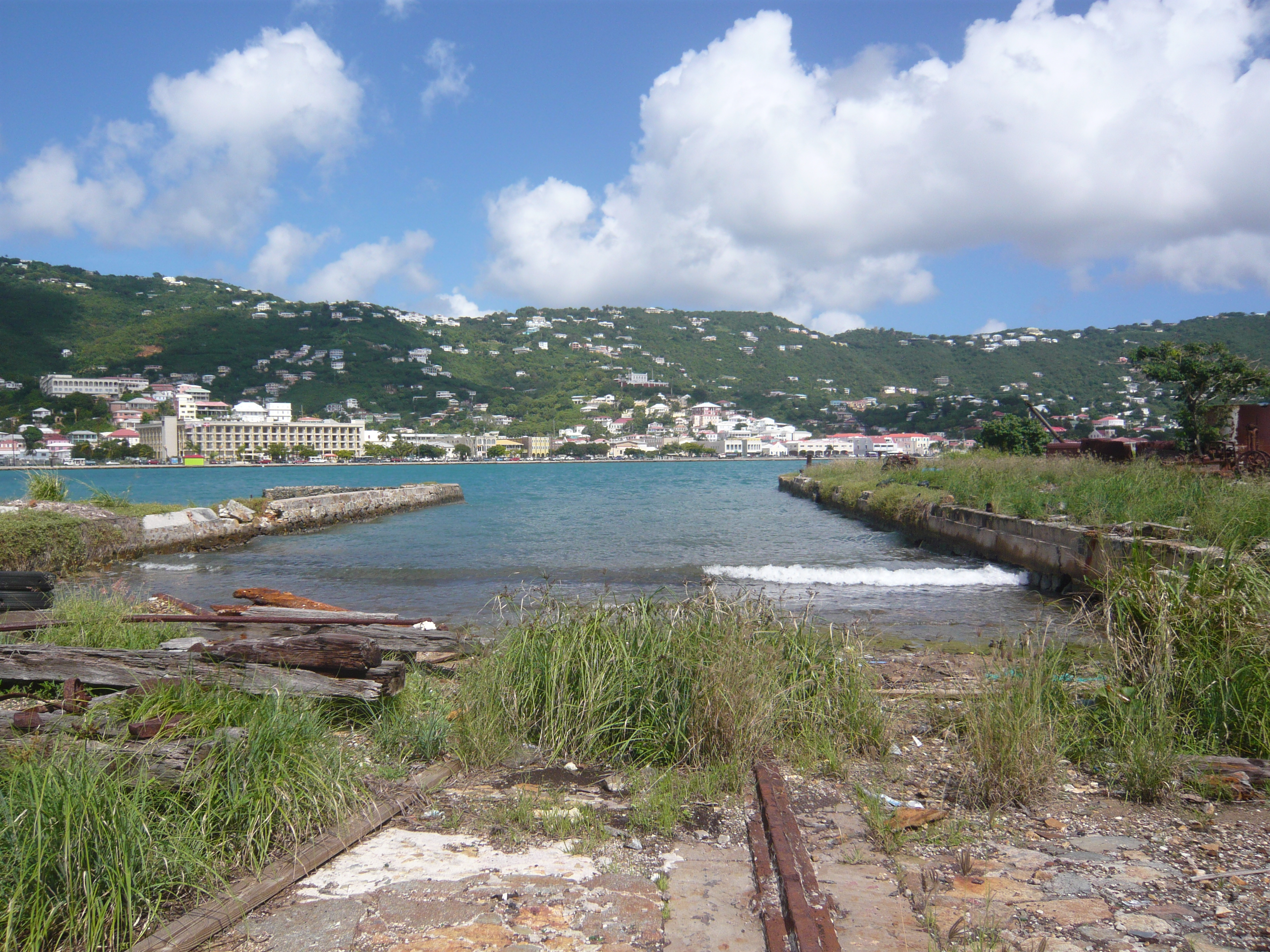
The remains of the Creque Marine Railway, looking down towards the water.

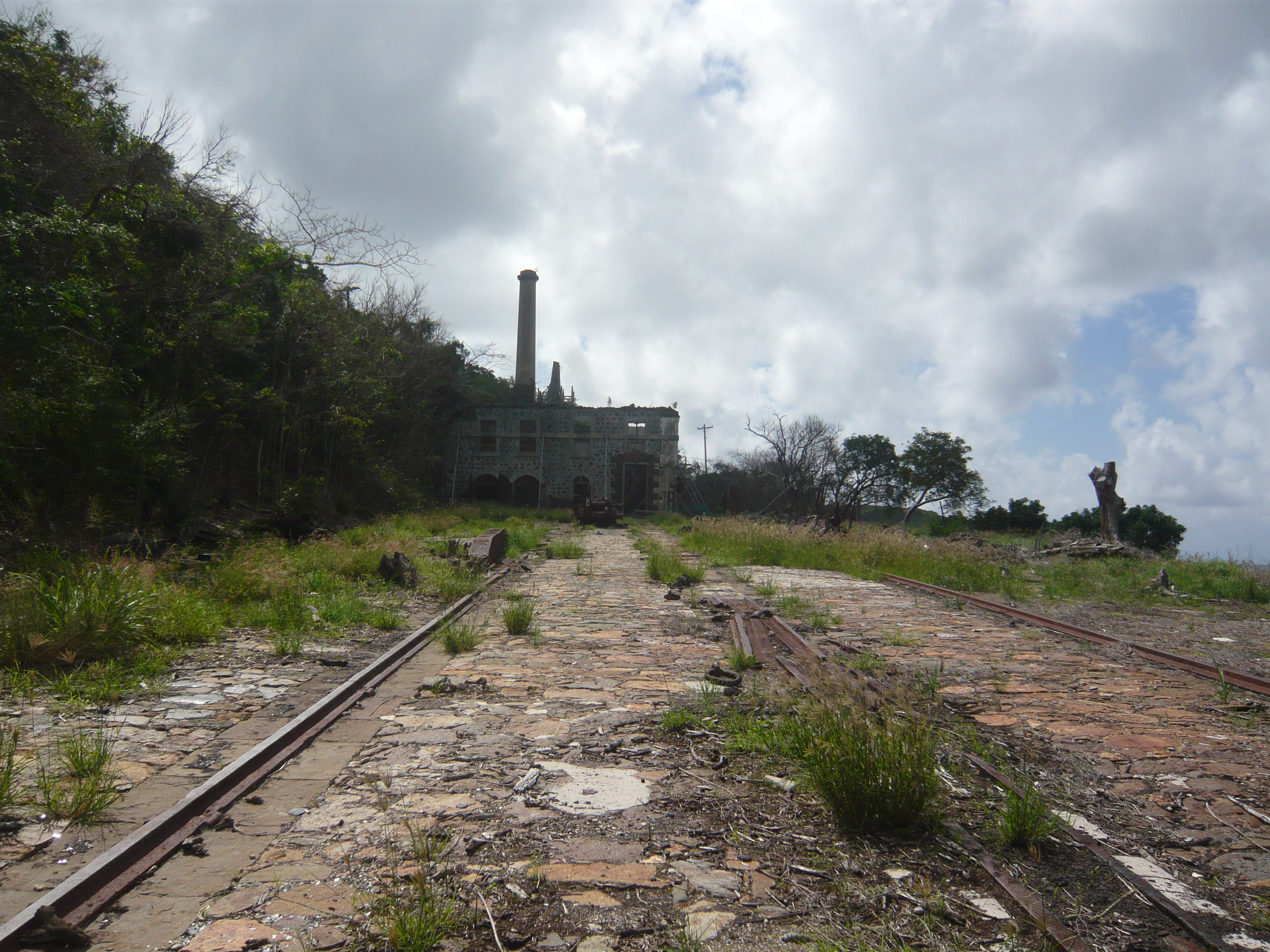
Creque Marine Railway powerhouse.

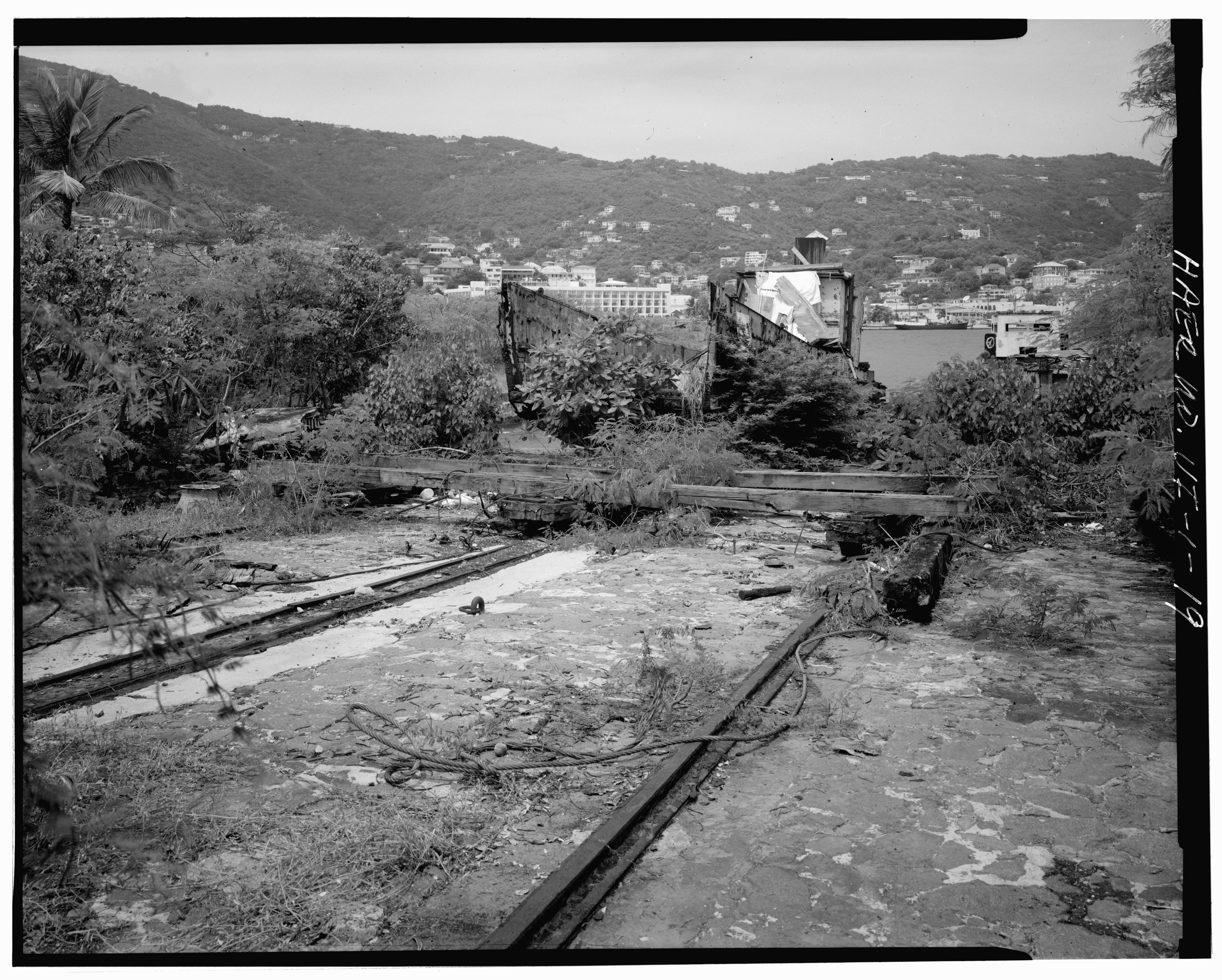

== History ==
=== 19th century ===
The marine railway was constructed in the 1840s by Danish investors, at Little Careening Cove on Hassel Island in the colonial Danish West Indies. It entered commercial service in 1844. It is probably the world's oldest surviving marine railway.

A large ship-cradle, built out of "greenheart" wood, ran on four rails, down a shallow incline into the water; the cradle was ballasted. A ship could be floated into the cradle, then drawn up the railway by a winch so that work could be done on the hull - or propellers - of the ship on dry land. The winch was driven by a beam engine.

The beam engine and winch mechanism were manufactured by Boulton of Hamburg, around 1840.

=== 20th century ===
The marine railway was originally called the "St Thomas Marine Repair Facility". It fell into financial difficulties and was auctioned in 1910. It was bought by Henry Creque, who refurbished it. By 1912, the site was back in working order under the name Creque's Maritime Railway Dock. Under new ownership, the business succeeded again. The Creque Marine Railway continued service into the 1960s.

During World War II, the U.S. military utilized Hassel Island including Creque Marine Railway and Careening Cove.

The site was fully abandoned in the 1960s. In 1978 a large part of Hassel Island was donated to the U.S. Department of the Interior as part of the Virgin Islands National Park.

=== 21st century ===
Hassel Island is accessible to the public by boat from mainland St. Thomas.

Hiking trails follow the historic routes on the island, passing Fort Shipley, the Creque Marine Railway, Hamburg American Line coaling station, West Indies headquarters of the Royal Mail Steam Packet Company, and other historic sites.

In 2006 the St. Thomas Historical Trust entered into a Memorandum of Understanding with Virgin Islands National Park, to repair, rehabilitate, and restore structures and areas on Hassel Island.

== See also ==
- Hassel Island, U.S. Virgin Islands
- Railway transportation in the United States Virgin Islands
- Danish West Indies topics (1754−1917)
- National Register of Historic Places listings in the United States Virgin Islands
