= Water Island, U.S. Virgin Islands =

Island of the United States Virgin Islands

Water Island
Native name: Vand ø (Danish) Nickname: Small City
- Location within the U.S. Virgin Islands Location within the Caribbean

Geography
- Location: Caribbean Sea
- Coordinates: 18°19′11″N 64°57′12″W
- Archipelago: Virgin Islands, Leeward Islands
- Area: 1.989 km^{2} (0.768 sq mi)

Administration
- United States; United States Virgin Islands
- Insular area: United States Virgin Islands
- District: Saint Thomas
- Sub-district: Water Island

Demographics
- Demonym: Water Islander
- Population: 182 (2010)
- Pop. density: 91.50/km^{2} (236.98/sq mi)

Water Island (Danish: Vand ø) is a minor island in the United States Virgin Islands, an American territory located in the Caribbean Sea. The rest of the U.S. Virgin Islands were acquired by the Americans in 1917 from Denmark; however, Water Island was excluded, thus the Danish East Asiatic Company, and by proxy the Danish kingdom, continued to own Water Island until several decades later. Water Island was bought by the U.S. Government in 1944, and in 1996 it was transferred to the U.S. Virgin Islands. The island is of volcanic origin and lies to the south of Saint Thomas in the Charlotte Amalie harbor. A ferry service runs regularly from Crown Bay, Saint Thomas, to Phillips Landing, Water Island; the ferry ride is about 10 minutes.

At 491.5 acres (1.989 km^{2}) in size, it is administratively part (with Hassel Island) of the subdistrict of Water Island, in Saint Thomas District. Water Island is a residential island, with a population of 182 (2010 census) and no significant commercial establishments. A number of homes on Water Island are available to accommodate visitors. The main attractions are beaches, including Honeymoon Beach, plantation ruins, Fort Segarra, an underground fort partially constructed by the U.S. during World War II, and scuba diving site Supermarket Reef in Limestone Bay.

The eastern third of the island is a gated community, Sprat Bay Estates. This includes Sprat Point, a 30-acre peninsula and nature preserve owned by the United States Department of the Interior, and private Sprat Bay Beach, located between Sprat Point and Carol Point. All beaches in the USVI are public when approached from the water.

== History ==
The earliest settlers were Taíno in the 15th century. Water Island was named by Europeans for its natural ponds of freshwater. Many islands in the Lesser Antilles lack potable water, so Water Island was a frequent stop for pirates seeking to replenish their ships' stores of freshwater.

Danish claims to the island date to at least 1769. During the 18th century and early 19th century, the island was owned by several free black and mulatto people who had cotton plantations and raised livestock. In 1905, the island was sold to the Danish East Asiatic Company. The U.S. believed that the company acted as a front for Germany and sought to establish a German naval base and commercial presence on Saint Thomas.

While the rest of the Danish West Indies were purchased by the United States in 1917, Water Island was not purchased by the U.S. until June 19, 1944, when it was purchased for $10,000 to protect the submarine base on Saint Thomas during World War II.

From 1944 to 1950, the island was under the operation of the Department of Defense. Construction on Fort Segarra commenced in 1944, but the fort was abandoned incomplete in 1948. The United States Army's Chemical Warfare Division used sections of Water Island to test chemical warfare agents, including predecessors of Agent Orange, from 1948 until 1950. It was then turned over to the Department of the Interior and leased out, primarily to residential tenants.

Control of Water Island was transferred from the federal government to the territorial government on December 12, 1996, for the sum of $25,000,000 (the same amount the federal government paid for the entire U.S. Virgin Islands in 1917) making Water Island the "Last Virgin". In the late 1990s, the Department of the Interior began transferring Water Island land to the long-time residential leaseholders. In 2005, the U.S. Virgin Islands government announced plans to further develop Water Island, and to increase the amount of residential housing to deal with chronic shortages on Saint Thomas.

The Water Island Civic Association (WICA) was formed in 1971 to help improve the quality of life on Water Island. Today, the association has around 90 memberships and it interacts and cooperates with the U.S. Virgin Islands government to help protect the environment on Water Island. Water Island residents volunteer to help maintain the beauty of the beach and other clean-up efforts around the island.

== Notable features ==
=== Honeymoon Beach ===
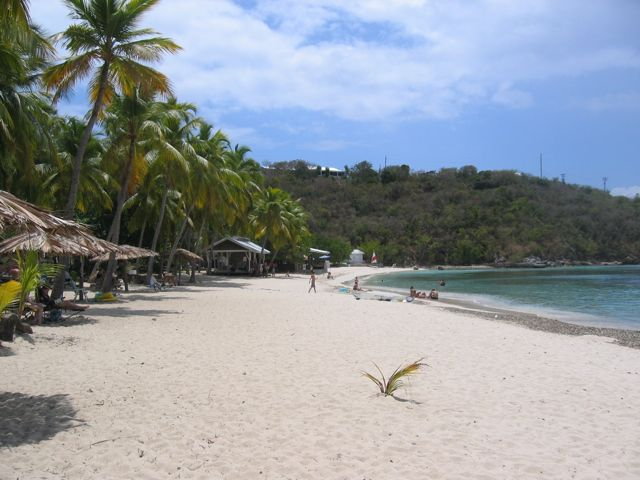
Honeymoon Beach

One of the principal attractions of Water Island is Honeymoon Beach, in Druif Bay, on the west end of the island. Initially Honeymoon Beach could hardly be called a beach. It was an area about 50 feet (15 m) long strewn with vegetation and rocks and only extended about 10 feet (3.0 m) from the water line. The trees and brush were removed, 200 truck loads of rock and gravel were hauled off, and the beach stone was broken up with a bulldozer. The sand was sifted to remove any remaining debris and a dredge was used to remove the seaweed and to deposit sand on the shore. Rows of palm trees were planted back from the shoreline. This was all accomplished under the direction of Walter Phillips, the Master Leaseholder in the early 1950s.

In the 1970s Water Island was also home to a sizable hotel called the "Water Island Colony Club" which offered villas for rent as well as hotel rooms. The name was changed to "Sugar Bird" and later to "The Sea Cliff Hotel" and met its demise when Hurricane Hugo hit. The barracks for Fort Segarra were used as housing for the employees of the hotel.

=== Fort Segarra ===
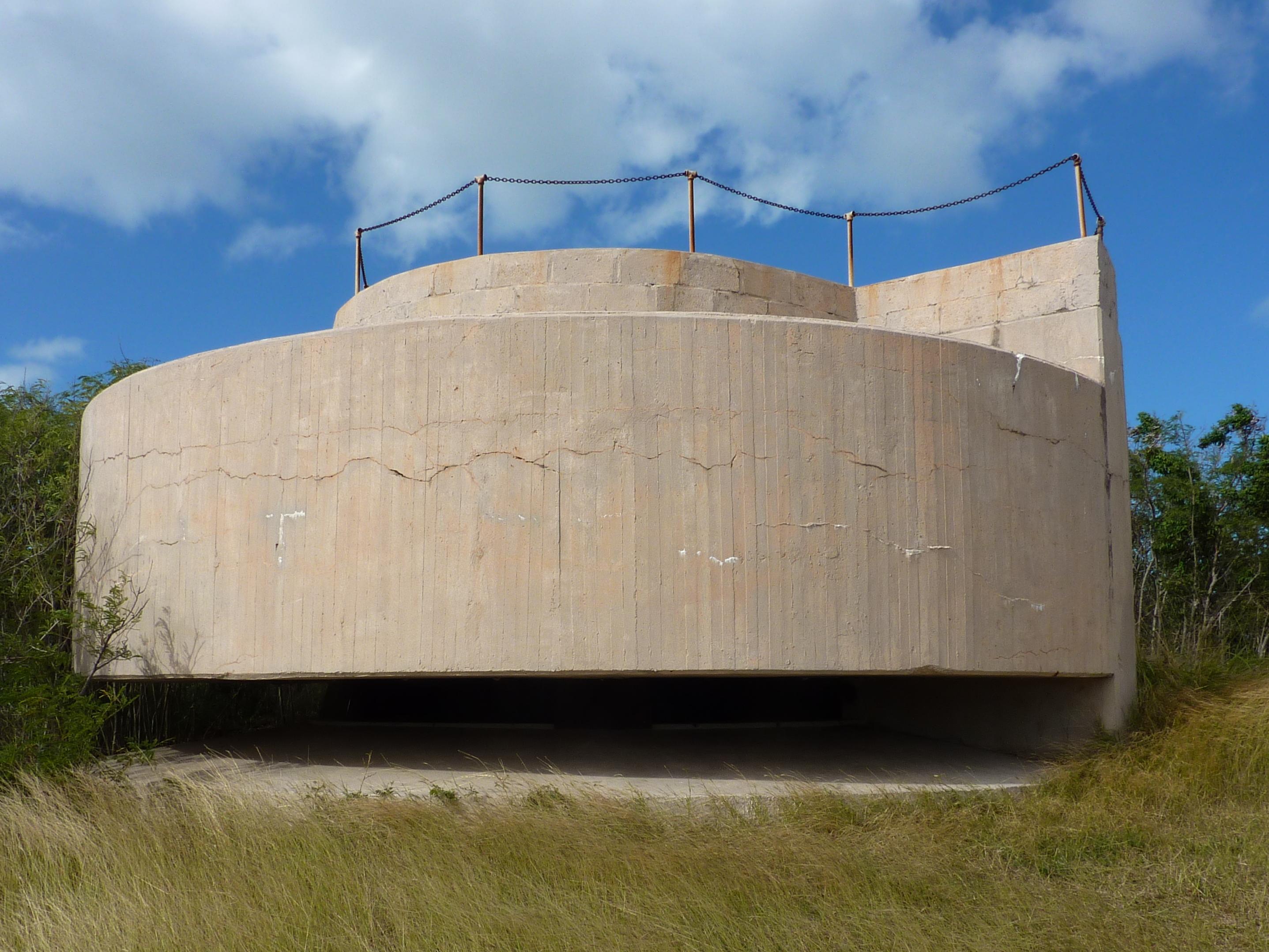
Fort Segarra, 2013

Fort Segarra was built on Water Island during World War II as part of the US war effort. World War II seacoast batteries here were Battery 314 at Flamingo Point (1944, never completed) and an Anti Motor Torpedo Boat Battery. In addition, some barracks, watch towers, and ammunition bunkers were also created near Carolina Point as well as an infrastructure of docks, roads, and water, sewage, and power systems. It was to be an underground fort and its purpose was to protect the submarine base on Saint Thomas. The war ended before its completion and the project was subsequently abandoned. The uncompleted post was transferred to the Army's Chemical Warfare Division in 1948 for testing poison gas and chemical agents on goats and pigeons for several years. Following the conclusion of these tests, the Army transferred control of this area to the Interior Department in 1952.

Gun emplacements, tunnels, and underground rooms built during World War II are still visible. The site is now open for viewing, and tunnels and underground chambers are open for tours. The area is monitored by the United States Army Corps of Engineers and soil samples are monitored from the former chemical test sites to ensure "that no residual contamination remains from previous Department of Defense activities."

=== Visiting Water Island ===
The island can be reached by a people ferry from Crown Bay Marina or by other vessels. The ferry takes passengers to Phillips Landing where golf carts are available to rent for exploring the island. There are currently no hotels, although several homes are available to rent for visitors. Virgin Islands Campground also provides accommodations.
