= Patent slip =

Mechanism for hauling ships out of water

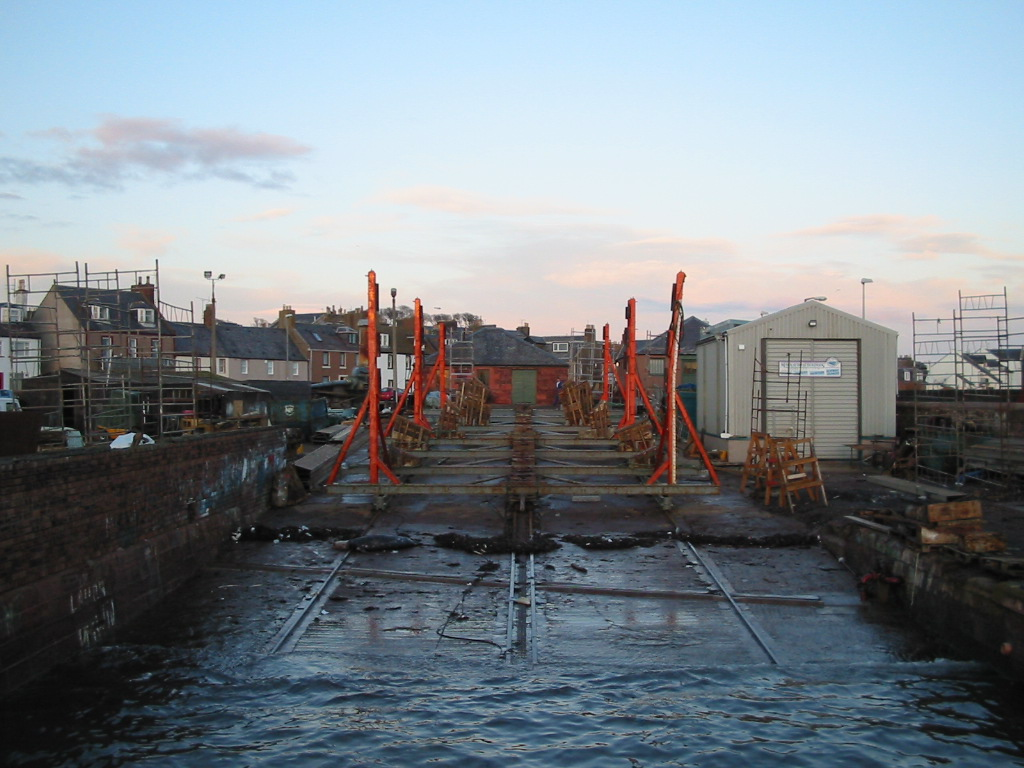
A patent slip at Arbroath, Scotland, as seen from the water's surface.

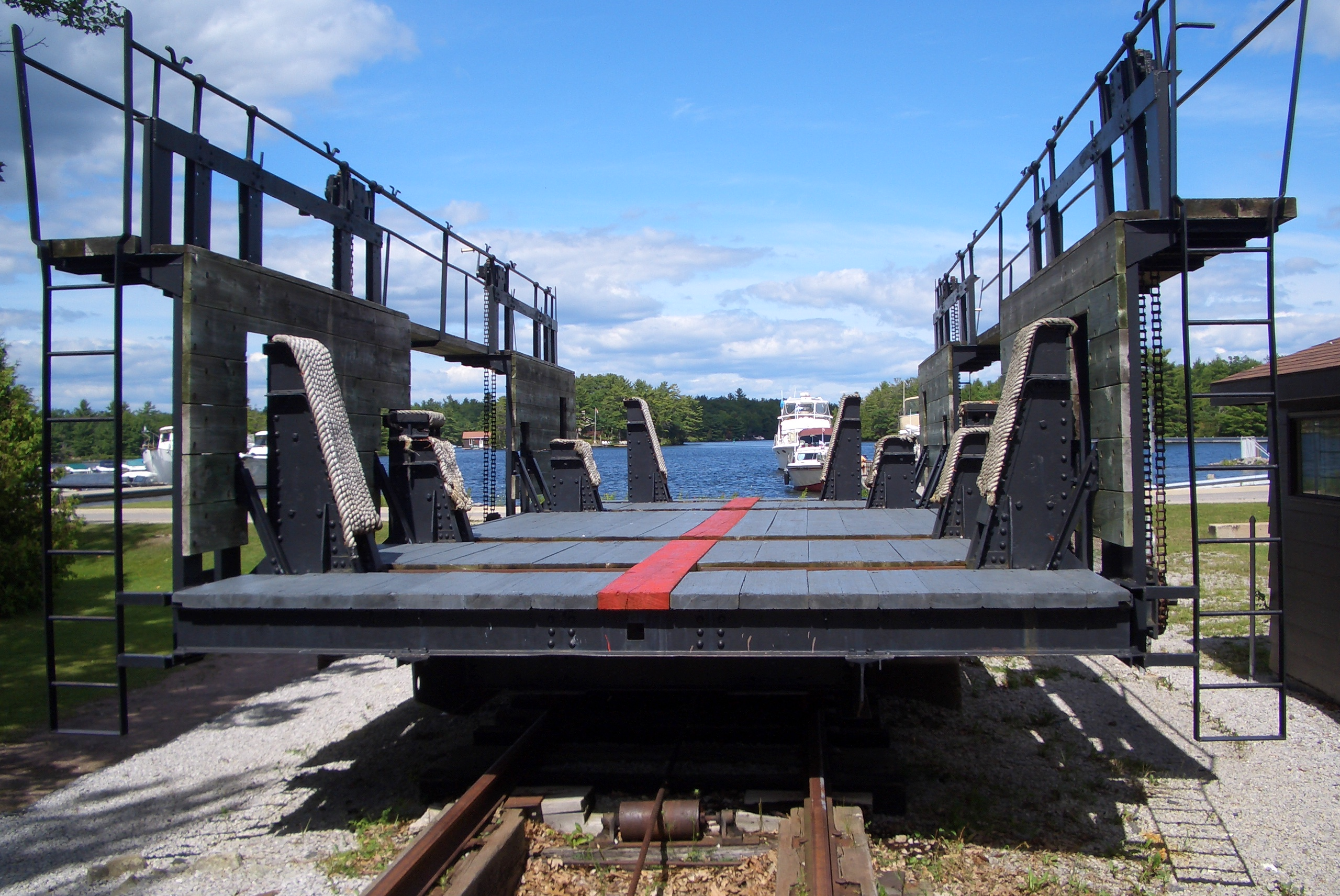
A rail-mounted cradle for carrying a ship.

A patent slip or marine railway is an inclined plane extending from shoreline into water, featuring a "cradle" onto which a ship is first floated, and a mechanism to haul the ship, attached to the cradle, out of the water onto a slip. The marine railway was invented by a Scot, Thomas Morton, in the early 19th century, as a cheaper alternative to dry docks for marine vessel repairs, in particular below waterline. Larger modern marine railways can handle vessels of thousands of tons.

== History ==
Invented by shipwright Thomas Morton in 1818, the marine railway offered an alternative to the expensive and time-consuming process of dry docking a ship to perform maintenance or repairs to its hull below waterline. The means and mechanisms over time became various, but always include a "cradle" onto which the ship is floated, and a mechanical mechanism for transferring the ship from water to land up an incline. The destination where work was performed was termed the slip.

Thomas Morton petitioned to extend the duration of his patent in 1832, before a Select committee of the House of Commons. The committee, chaired by the Rt. Hon. Sir George Cockburn, was convened and heard the claim that the slow construction and implementation of such slips required the extension, that the cost of using such slip was one tenth that of using a dry dock, and that by hauling completely onto a clear area it was easier to carry out maintenance. The committee was sympathetic, in particular regarding the small return that Morton had seen during the initial patent period, but ultimately did not support the requested extension.

== Operation ==
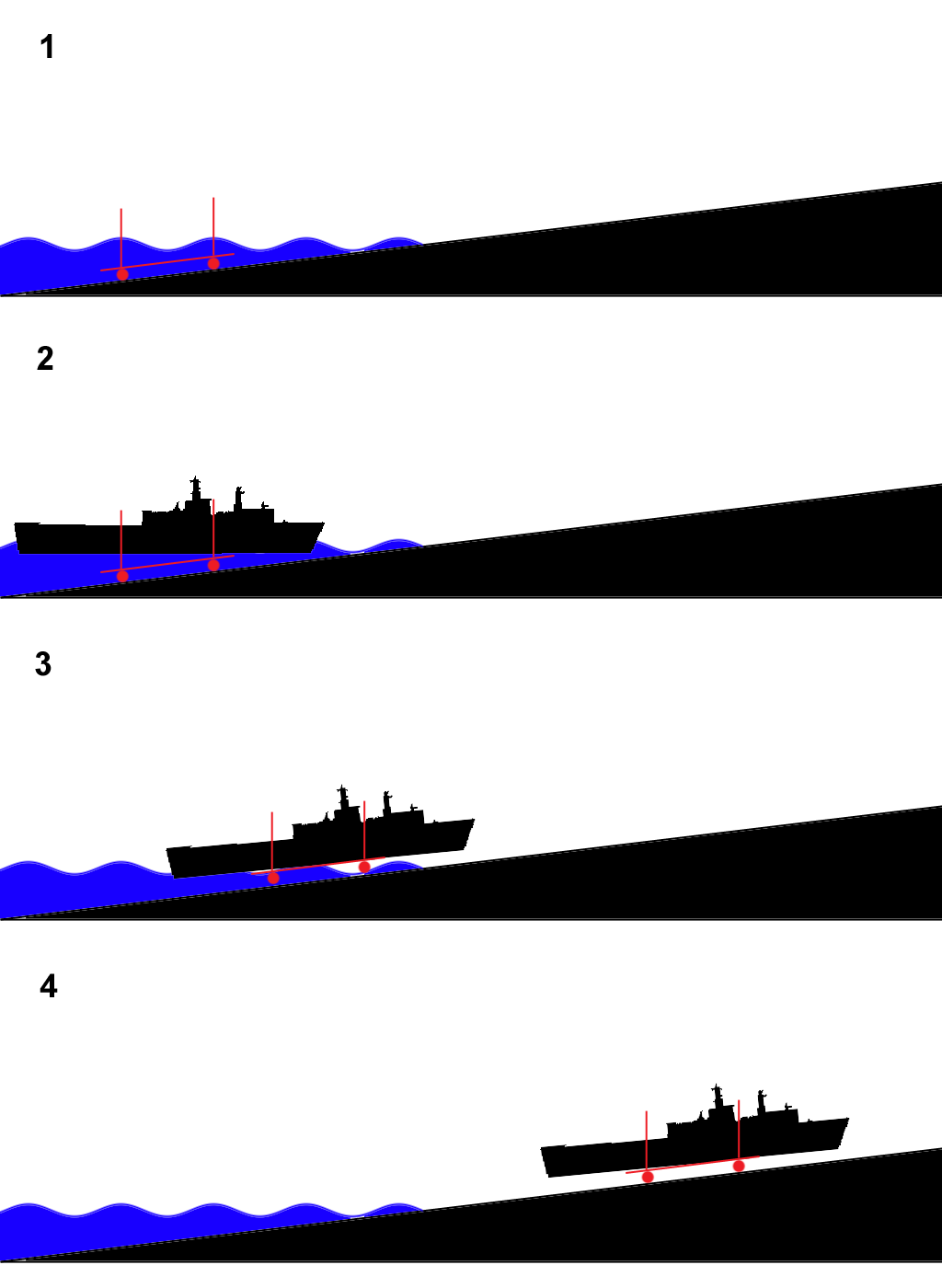
"Slipping" a vessel. Illustration of a vessel in profile view over the course of being slipped.

The process of slipping a vessel is an inexpensive and straightforward way to take a large vessel out of water for inspection or repair. In tidal harbors and ports, it is normally necessary to wait for high tide. In many cases, it is possible to take the vessel out of the water on one tide, and to make repairs and return it to the water on the next tide.

The first step in use of a patent slip or marine railway system involves a "cradle" being lowered to the bottom of the inclined plane (the slip/slipway), at which point the vessel is moved into position directly above the cradle. The vessel is then moored to the cradle with a number of ropes fore and aft to prevent the vessel from moving in any direction. Large marine railways can handle vessels of 6,000 tons.

Once the vessel is secured to the cradle, the process of hoisting the cradle out of the water and up the slipway begins. Care is taken when the cradle starts to bear the weight of the vessel; if the vessel is not sitting correctly in the cradle, it may damage the cradle or fall from it when fully out of the water. The vessel will usually sit on large wooden wedges when the lift out of the water begins; in the case of larger vessels, they may be temporarily welded to the cradle by divers. When slipway engineers and staff are satisfied that the vessel is correctly cradled, it is hoisted to the top of the slipway, normally beyond the high tide mark.

Originally, men or horses and block and tackle were used to provide mechanical advantage to drag the cradle and vessel up the slipway. With the advent of the steam engine, most marine railways were converted to steam powered operation. For remaining railways in existence, electric or electro-hydraulic winches are the norm.

== Reasons for use ==
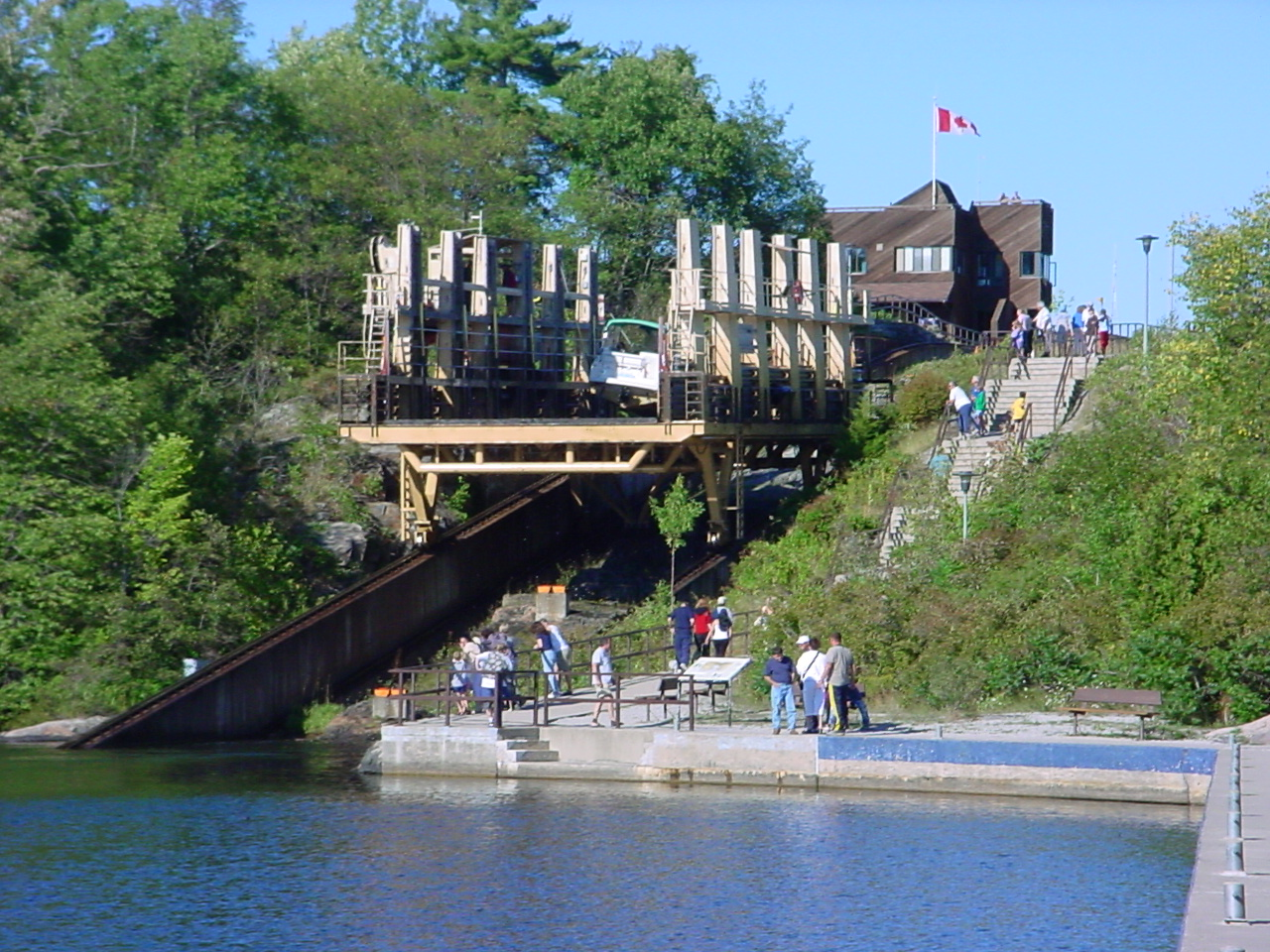
Big Chute Marine Railway, a patent slip in Ontario, Canada, serves the function of a canal lock.

A typical reason for slipping a vessel is so as to clean and paint it, and in particular, to apply anti-fouling protection to the hull. Other uses include repairs below the waterline, the replacement of propellers, inspections for insurance purposes, or the fitting of cathodic protection. Using a marine railway/patent slip avoids the need to pump out a dry dock, saving time and money.

In addition, a marine railway can substitute for a traditional waterway lock in areas where the terrain is poorly suited to an installation of that kind. This would consist of a railway where two ends each access a body of water, with a dry high point in between. A working example still in use is the Big Chute Marine Railway in Ontario, Canada.

== Examples ==
One of the earliest surviving marine railways is the Creque Marine Railway on Hassel Island in the Caribbean.

The Evans Bay Patent Slip operated in Wellington Harbour, New Zealand from 1873 until 1980, and is now a heritage area.
