= Cowell Battery, U.S. Virgin Islands =

Settlement in the United States Virgin Islands

Coordinates: 18°19′33″N 64°55′58″W

Sections A-A and B-B of Cowell's Battery

North, South, East, and West Elevations of Cowell's Battery

Cowell Battery is a settlement on the island of Hassel near Saint Thomas in the United States Virgin Islands. The population of the settlement and entire island in 2012 was 10. It was named after the British officer John Clayton Cowell of the Royal Regiment of Foot who was Governor of St Thomas during the British occupation of 1801–1802.
