= Fort Segarra =

WWII fort on Water Island, US Virgin Islands

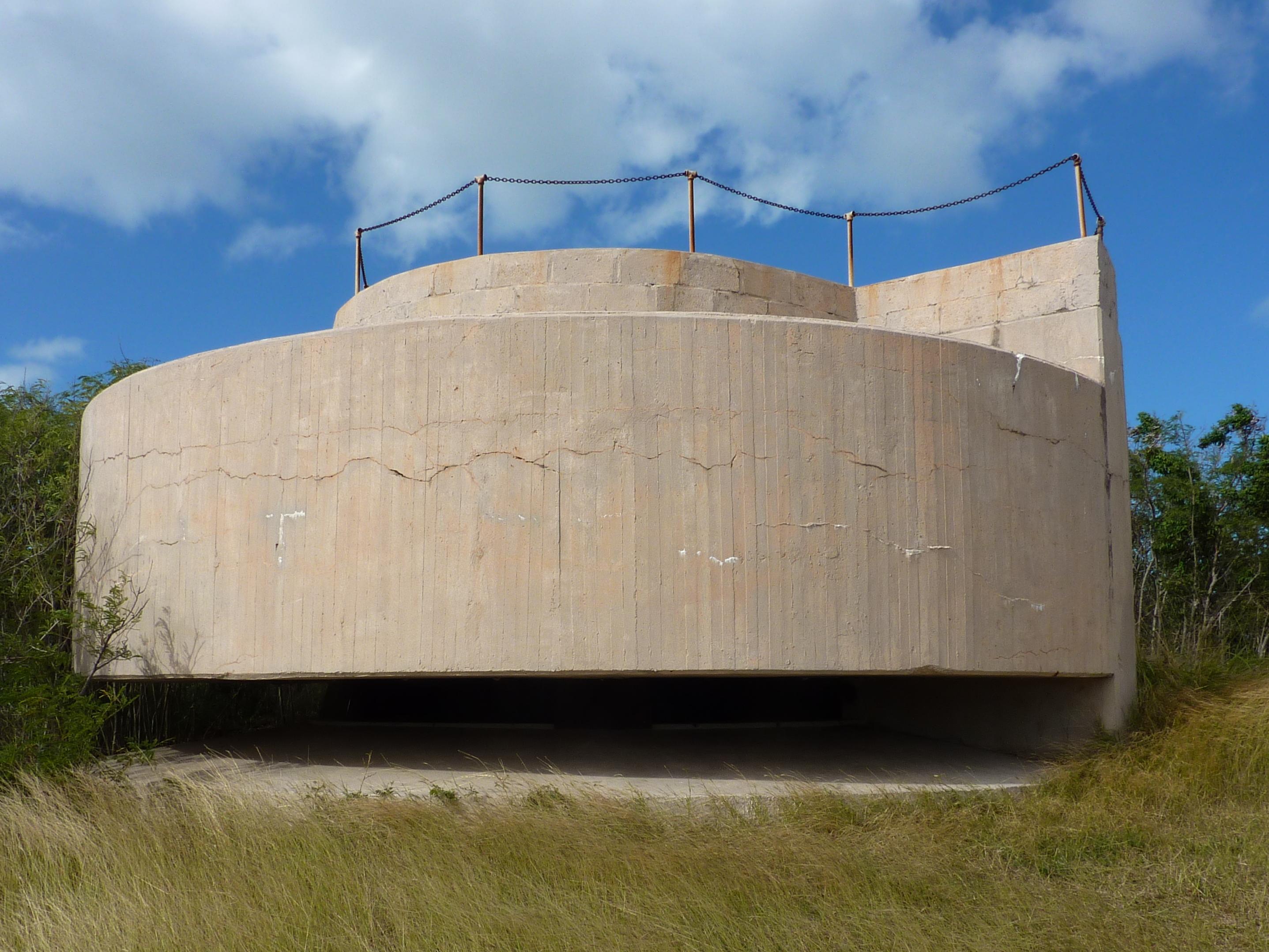
Fort Segarra, 2013

Fort Segarra was constructed by the United States during World War II on Water Island in the U.S. Virgin Islands in the Caribbean.

== History ==
The Army built barracks, watch towers, gun emplacements, underground bunkers, and additional structures on Water Island, and the installation became known as Fort Segarra. The Army constructed Battery 314 on top of a hill in the southern part of the island, but the guns were not installed and the emplacement was never operational. The Army installed guns at two places associated with the 818th Anti-Motor Torpedo Boat Battery (Druif Point and Providence Point). There was a pair of 37-millimeter guns at both locations and another pair of 90-millimeter guns at Druif Point.

In addition, some watch towers, barracks and ammunition bunkers were also built near Carolina Point and also an infrastructure of power, sewage and water systems as well as docks and roads. It was meant to be an underground fort to protect the submarine base on the island Saint Thomas.

With World War II winding down, the Army deactivated the 818th Battery in 1945 and deactivated Fort Segarra in 1946. The Army used Fort Segarra between 1948 and 1950 for tests associated with the Tropical Test Program. In 1948, the uncompleted post was eventually transferred to the Army's Chemical Warfare Division for testing poison gas and chemical agents on pigeons and goats for several years. In 1952, following the conclusion of these tests, the Army transferred the area to the Department of the Interior.

== Modern day ==
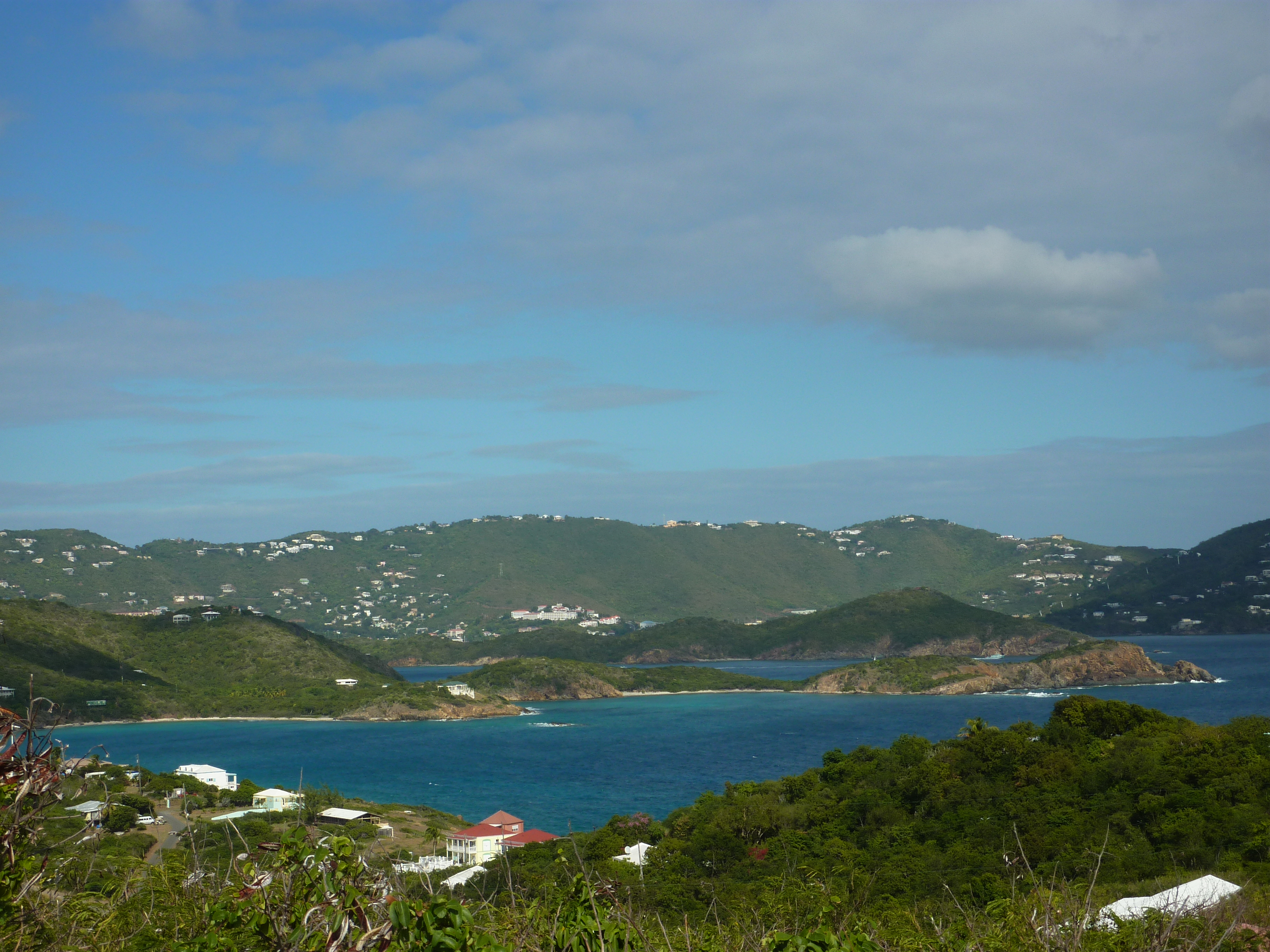
View from Fort Segarra, Water Island, in 2013

The underground rooms, gun emplacements and tunnels created during the World War II construction efforts are still visible. Tunnels and underground chambers are accessible for tourists. But the area is also a former chemical test site and monitored by the United States Army Corps of Engineers in order to ensure "no residual contamination remains from previous Department of Defense activities."
