= Fort Willoughby, U.S. Virgin Islands =

Historic fort on Hassel Island in the U.S. Virgin Islands

Fort Willoughby
- Hassel Island, U.S. Virgin Islands
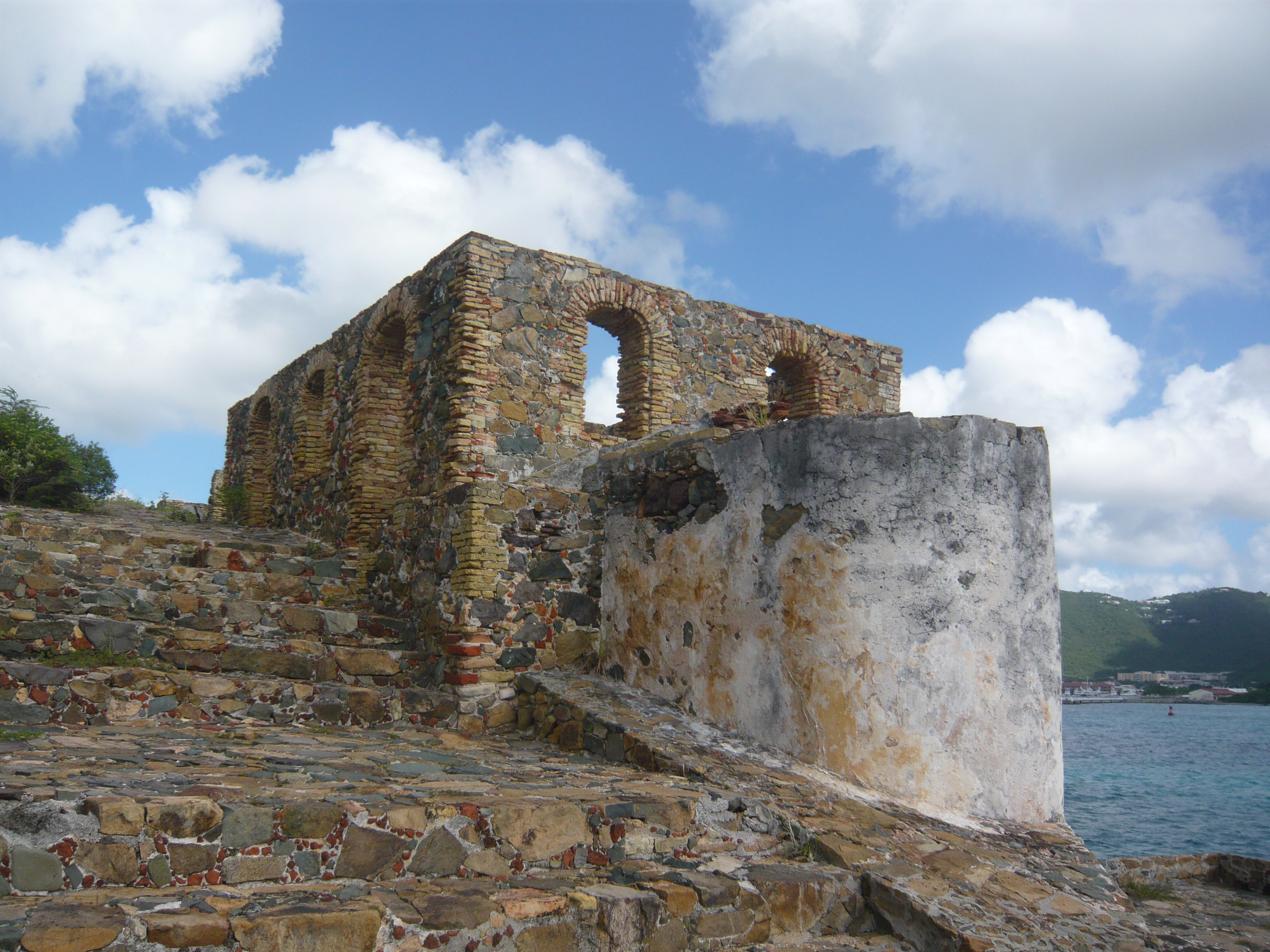
- Remains of Fort Willoughby

Site information
- Type: Fortification
- Owner: U.S. Virgin Island's government
- Open to the public: Yes

Location
- Location in the Caribbean
- Location within the Caribbean
- Coordinates: 18.1933°N 64.5549°W
- Area: Hassel Island Historic District

Site history
- Built: 1777-1780
- In use: No
- Materials: Stone

Fort Willoughby (previously Prince Frederik's Battery) is a historic fort on Hassel Island in the U.S. Virgin Islands.

The fort was built in 1777-1780 by the Danish, who originally named it Prince Frederik's Battery. At that time, Hassel Island was part of the Danish West Indies. During their first occupation of the Danish West Indies (1801-1802), the British took over the fort and renamed it Fort Willoughby. The British used the fort again during their second occupation of the Danish West Indies (1807-1815).

Originally, the fort consisted of parapet wall, gun platform, barracks, magazine, and storeroom, as well as kitchen, cistern, and privy. Today, the remains of the fort consist of the remnants of the magazine, barracks, and cistern.

Fort Willoughby is protected within the Virgin Islands National Park. It contributes to the Hassel Island Historic District, which has been listed on the National Register of Historic Places since 1976.
