= Charlotte Amalie West, U.S. Virgin Islands =

Charlotte Amalie West Charlotte Amalie Vest (Danish)
- Census-Designated Place
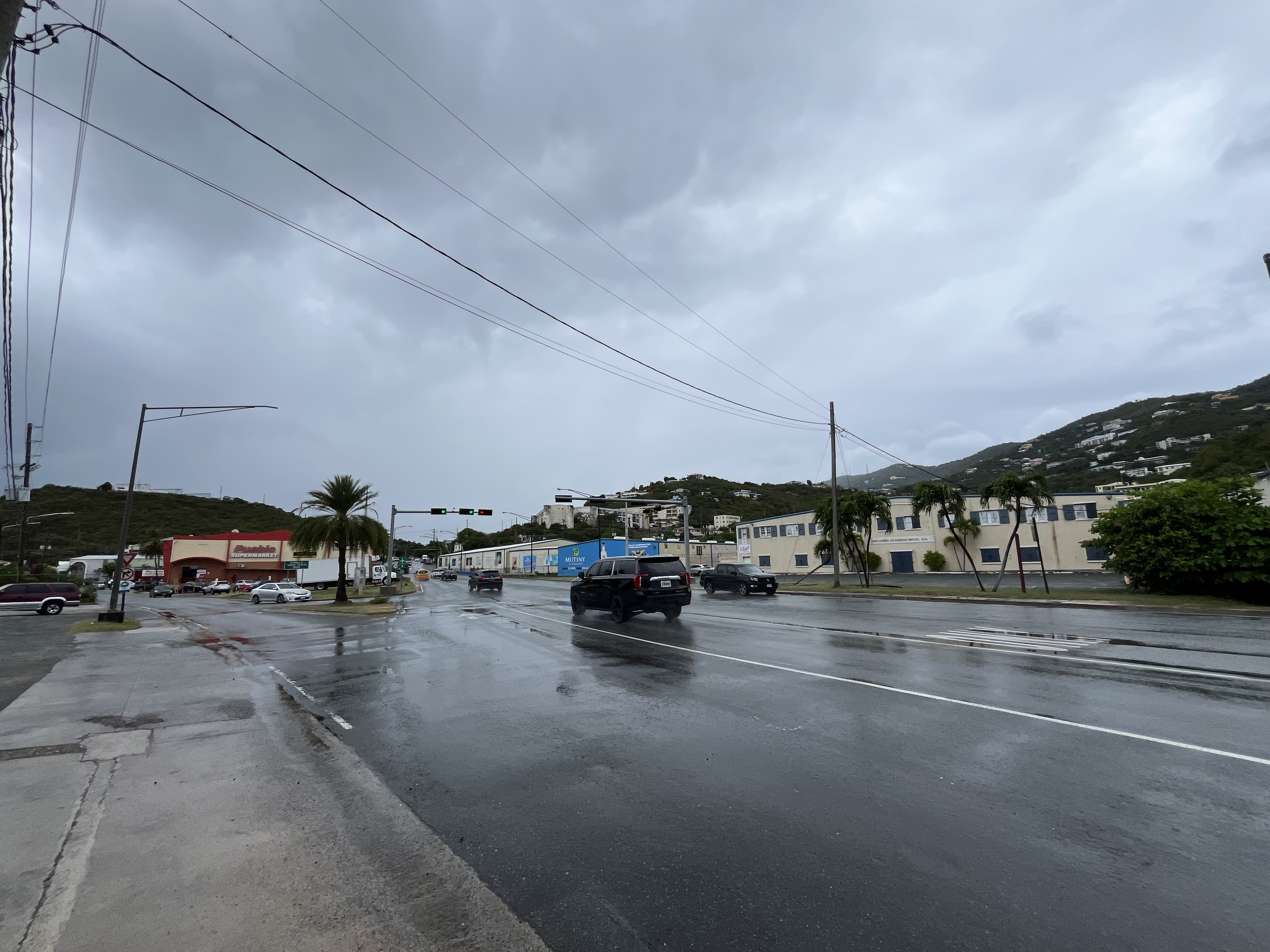

- Location within the United States Virgin Islands
- Coordinates: 18°21′N 64°57′W
- Country: United States
- Territory: U.S. Virgin Islands
- Administrative District: Saint Thomas-Saint John
- Island (Census District): Saint Thomas
- Subdistrict(s): Charlotte Amalie, Northside
- Elevation: 10 ft (3.0 m)

Population (2020)
  - Total: 4,404
- ZIP code: 00802, 00803
- Area code: 340
- GNIS feature ID: 2414008

Charlotte Amalie West (Danish: Charlotte Amalie Vest) is a census-designated place (CDP) in St. Thomas, U.S. Virgin Islands on the west side of the island. It is the third largest town or census-designated place (CDP) in the U.S. Virgin Islands (after Charlotte Amalie and Anna's Retreat). Together with the historical town of Charlotte Amalie and the census-designated place (CDP) Charlotte Amalie East, Charlotte Amalie West make up the subdistrict and "the City" of Charlotte Amalie

St. Thomas, Subdistricts, towns, and CDPs

Charlotte Amalie West is the transportation and industrial area of the island of St. Thomas. Within Charlotte Amalie West is one of the two airports in the US Virgin Islands, the Crown Bay Ports, Crown Bay marina, a marine drydock, the VITRAN (Virgin Island Public Transit) bus depot, ferry docks for surrounding islands, and Randolph Harley Power Plant operated by the Virgin Islands Water and Power Authority (WAPA) for the St. Thomas-St. John district.

== History ==
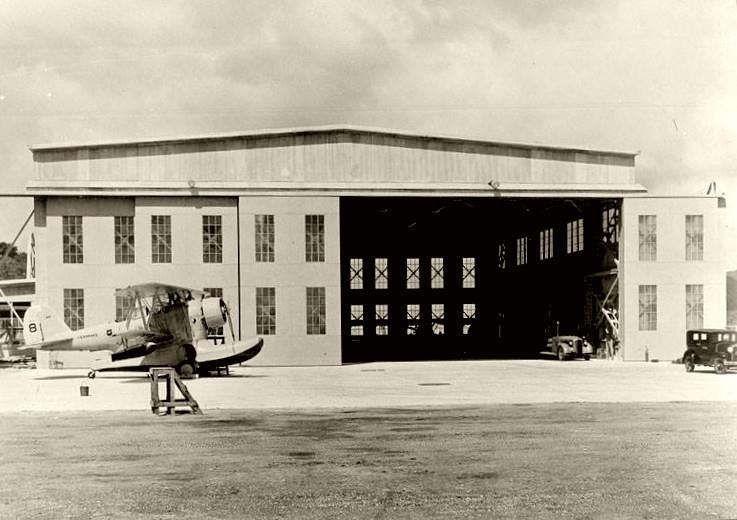
Main hangar from Bourne Field that was used as the civilian airport terminal until November 1990

During the Danish colonial period, much of the land in Charlotte Amalie West was used for plantation agriculture, particularly sugarcane and cotton. Estates with names like Estate Niesky, Estate Contant, Estate Altona were spread across this area. It remained relatively undeveloped compared to the bustling harbor town of Charlotte Amalie to the east.

Early 20th Century: As urbanization slowly expanded outward from the town center, some residential and institutional developments began appearing further west into this area. However, much of Charlotte Amalie West remained characterized by farmland, hillsides, and estate remnants.

World War I to 1931: The US Navy established their first presence in the territory. Initially, the U.S. Navy administered the territory. During this early period, a small naval station was established in Charlotte Amalie West, primarily focused on submarine support.

1935 through World War II: Additional parts of the Charlotte Amalie West area was absorbed into U.S. military planning.

- In 1935 the US government took over an airstrip and repurposed it as a military air station. They renamed the airstrip Bourne Field.
- In 1939 the US Navy began the construction of a submarine base in Charlotte Amalie West. In addition to this base, a "bombproof powerhouse (four 750 KW diesel generators) and laundry was also created to power the military facilities and clean clothes.
- In 1940 the U.S. Navy operated a hospital in Charlotte Amalie West.
- On March 4, 1943, Bourne Field was merged with the nearby naval facilities and redesignated as the Navy Operating Base, St. Thomas. This consolidation aimed to streamline operations and enhance coordination among various military activities on the island.
- On July 1, 1944, the base was further redesignated as Marine Corps Air Station St. Thomas. This expansion included the integration of a seaplane base at Lindbergh Bay, enhancing the island's capabilities for aerial operations and surveillance.

Post-War Expansion (1950s–1980s): Following the war, as the Virgin Islands became more integrated under U.S. governance, population growth and modernization led to expansion westward from downtown Charlotte Amalie. Housing developments, public schools, and commercial zones emerged. Infrastructure such as roads and utilities improved dramatically in this period.

Present Day: Today, Charlotte Amalie West represents the further expansion of the original settlement. Many of the military facilities were turned over to the territorial government and repurposed for civilian use.

- Bourne Field is now the Cyril E. King Airport
- The Naval Submarine Base is now in the location of the Crown Bay Cruise Port, Crown Bay Marina and Crown Bay Cargo Container Port.
- The University of the Virgin Islands Orville Kean Campus is now occupies the officer quarters for the Navy and Marine Corps.
- The old Naval power plant has been replaced by the Randolph Harley Power Plant, the primary power plant on St. Thomas, U.S. Virgin Islands. This facility is operated by the Virgin Islands Water and Power Authority (WAPA). It serves as a critical infrastructure component, providing electricity to the entire islands of St. Thomas, St. John and Water Island.
- The former Navy hospital is now part of the Lindbergh Bay Boutique Hotel

Over time, this growing section of the island was administratively recognized as its own CDP around 1990, distinct from the historic downtown yet the grown of the original settlement of Charlotte Amalie the town. The CDP now includes schools, residential neighborhoods, and commercial zones.

== Demographics ==
=== 2020 Census ===
Charlotte Amalie West CDP, U.S. Virgin Islands – Racial and ethnic composition Note: the US Census treats Hispanic/Latino as an ethnic category. This table excludes Latinos from the racial categories and assigns them to a separate category. Hispanics/Latinos may be of any race.
Race / Ethnicity (NH = Non-Hispanic)	Pop 2020	% 2020
White alone (NH)	176	4.00%
Black or African American alone (NH)	3,020	68.57%
Native American or Alaska Native alone (NH)	12	0.27%
Asian alone (NH)	47	1.07%
Native Hawaiian or Pacific Islander alone (NH)	1	0.02%
Other race alone (NH)	33	0.75%
Mixed race or Multiracial (NH)	111	2.52%
Hispanic or Latino (any race)	1,004	22.80%
Total	4,404	100.00%

== Transportation ==
=== Airports ===
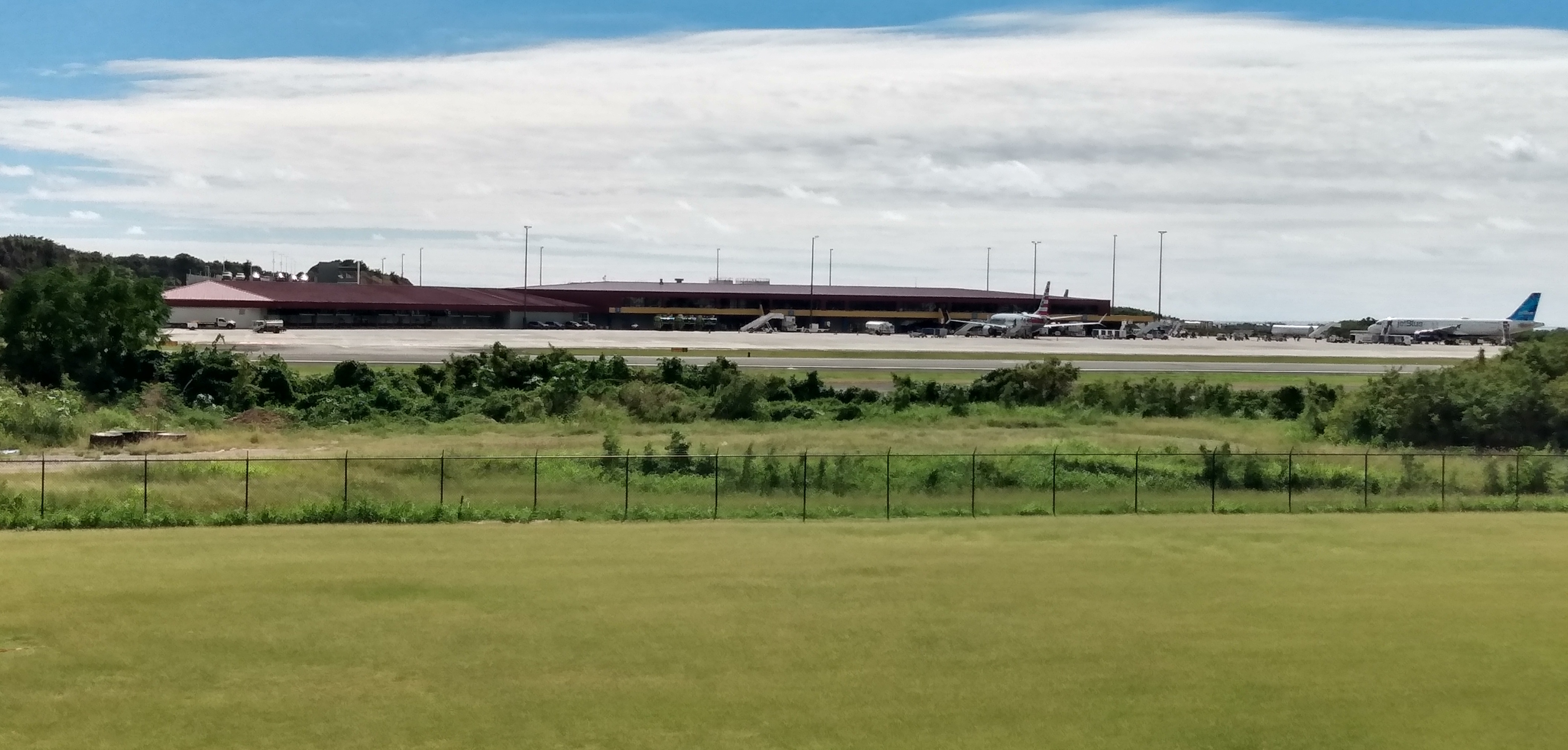
Cyril E King Airport Terminal as seen from the UVI campus

Cyril E. King Airport (IATA: STT ICAO: TIST) is the busiest airport in the Virgin Islands archipelago and second busiest in Puerto Rico and the Virgin Islands archipelago behind only the Luis Muñoz Marín International Airport in Carolina, Puerto Rico for total passengers served per year. It offers regular nonstop service to destinations to Chicago, Houston, San Juan and along the east coast of the United States.

=== Cruise Ports ===
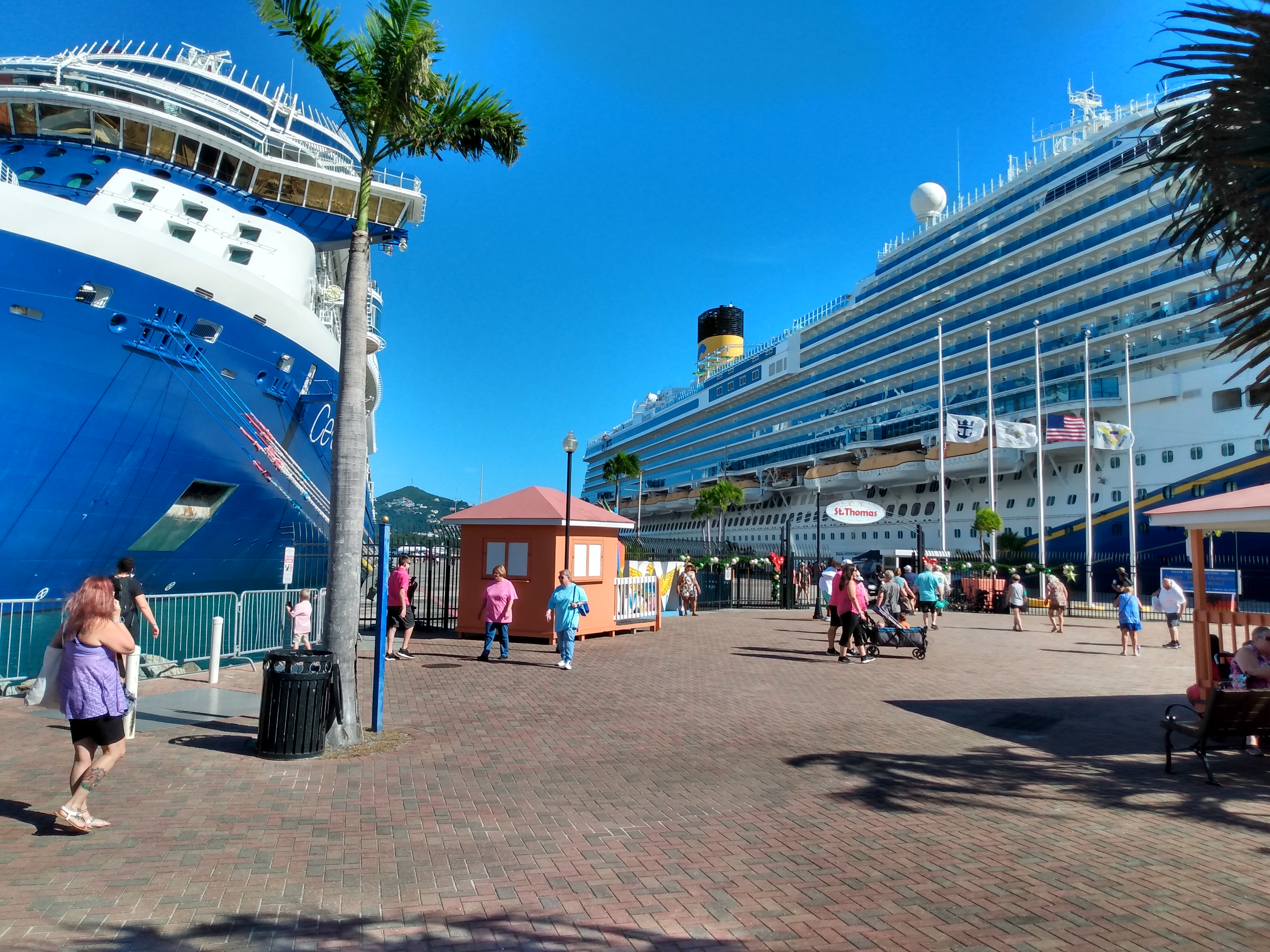
Crown Bay Cruise Port

Charlotte Amalie West also holds one of the two cruise ports in St. Thomas, the other being the West Indian Company (WICO) dock in Havensight of Charlotte Amalie East. The Crown Bay cruise port has space for 2 large cruise ships as well as on port shopping center.

=== Ferry Terminals ===
Within the Crown Bay Marina are docks for ferries going to both St. John and Water Island.

=== Public Transit ===
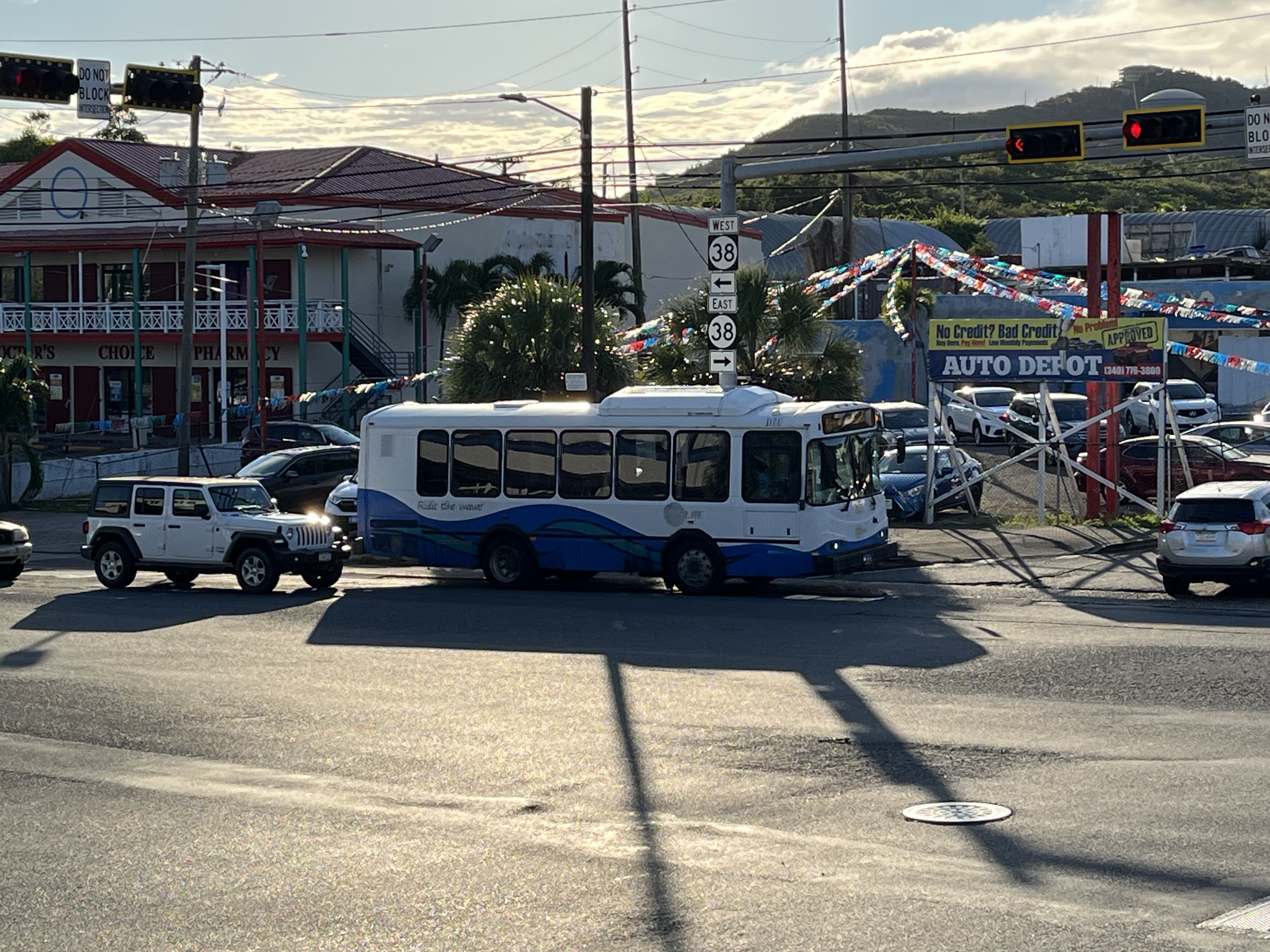
VITRAN bus on St Thomas.

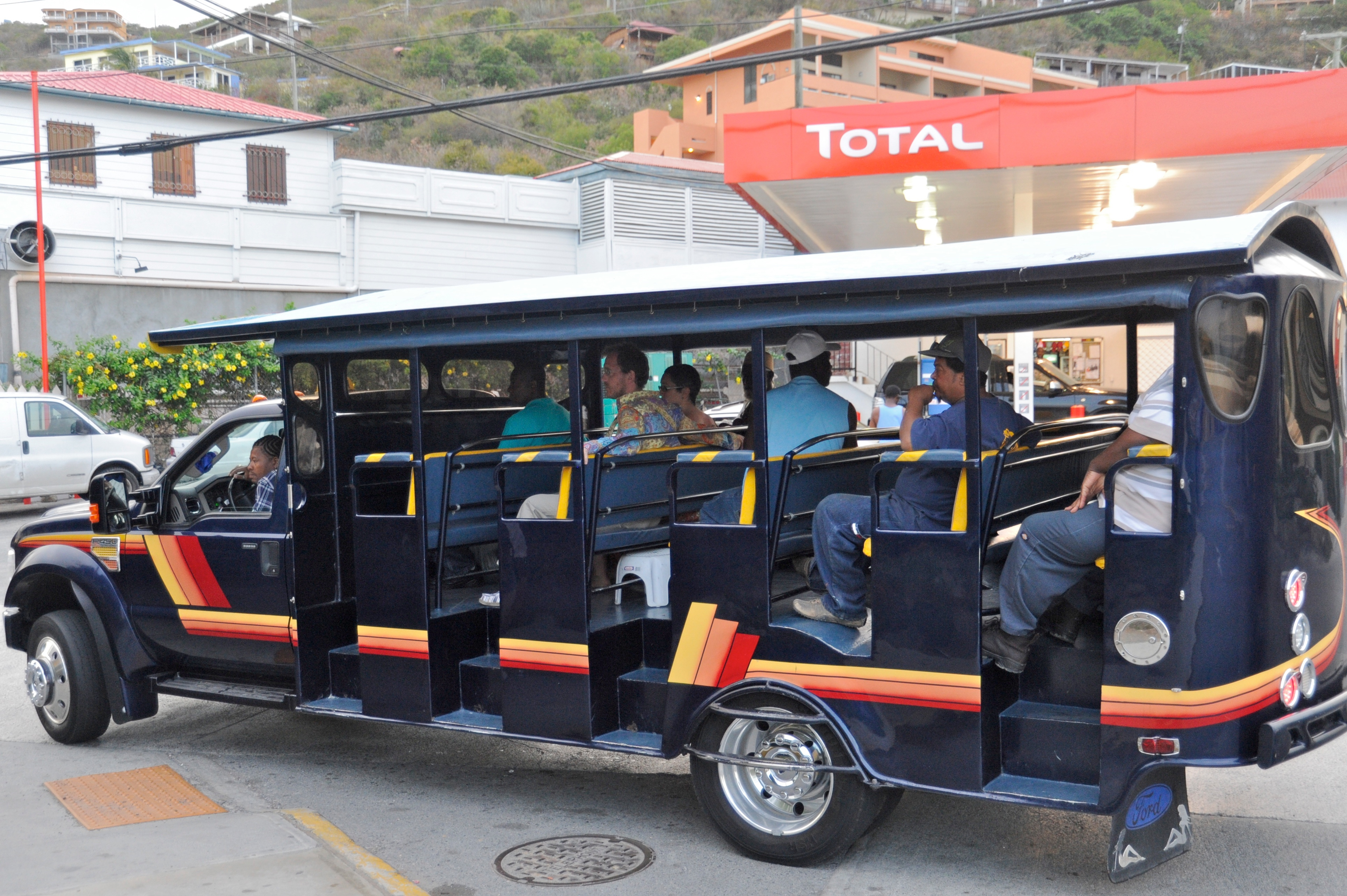
Safaris

The VITRAN (Virgin Island Public Transit) system is a comprehensive public transportation system serving the U.S. Virgin Islands. The system encompasses various modes of transportation, including buses, paratransit services and ferries. The buses and paratransit services are the only modes of transport that are available within the Charlotte Amalie West however.

==== Public Fixed Path Transit ====
Unlike other comprehensive public transportation systems in US cities, VITRAN does not service the local airport or the local university. Only one VITRAN bus route serves the CDP of Charlotte Amalie West as others have been discontinued. Below of the list of bus routes, current and past:

1. VITRAN 101 - City/UVI [suspended],
2. VITRAN 102 - City/Subbase/Airport [suspended],
3. VITRAN 201 - Bordeaux.

==== Public Paratransit Service ====
The paratransit service provided by VITRAN is a specialized transportation system designed to serve individuals with disabilities who cannot access the regular fixed public transit services. This service adheres to the guidelines of the Americans with Disabilities Act (ADA), ensuring accessible transportation for elderly, those with mobility issues and disabled residents and visitors. This VITRAN service include door-to-door or curb-to-curb transport and advanced reservation systems at half the price of the fixed path transist.

=== Alternative Fixed Path Transit ===
"Safaris", as they are called locally, are open air taxis mounted onto the back of a pickup truck. Because VITRAN bus transit is not very efficient, some "safari" drivers operate on several VITRAN bus fixed paths. Some Safari drivers still run on the old VITRAN 101 route.

=== Highways and Major Roads ===
In the USVI, highways and major routes beginning with 3-4 are located on St. Thomas. Many of these highways and routes pass through or border the town of Charlotte Amalie. Some of the major highways and roads include:

- Highway 30 (VI 30) passes through Charlotte Amalie West as Veteran's Drive and Moravian Highway.
- Route/Highway 33 (VI 33) connects to Highway 30 as Crown Mountain Road.
- Route 302 (VI 302) connects to Highway 30 as Airport Road providing access to the Cyril E King Airport Main terminal.
- Route 303 (VI 303) connects to Highway 30 as the Contant Thruway.
- Route 304 (VI 304) connects to Highway 30 and Route 302. It passes through the Crown Bay area the Athniel C. "Addie" Ottley Drive and Sara Hill Road.
- Route 305 (VI 305) connects to Route 304 at both ends and provides access to the Crown Bay Cruise Port as Crown Bay Center Road.
- Route/Highway 308 (VI 308) connects to Highway 30 as Harwood Highway.
- Route 332 (VI 332) is a spur route of Highway 33. The road provides a link from Route 33 to Route 40, connecting two major north–south roads out of Charlotte Amalie in the mountains. Route 332 is Scott Free Road and Lower Solberg Road in the mountains.

== Territorial Government ==
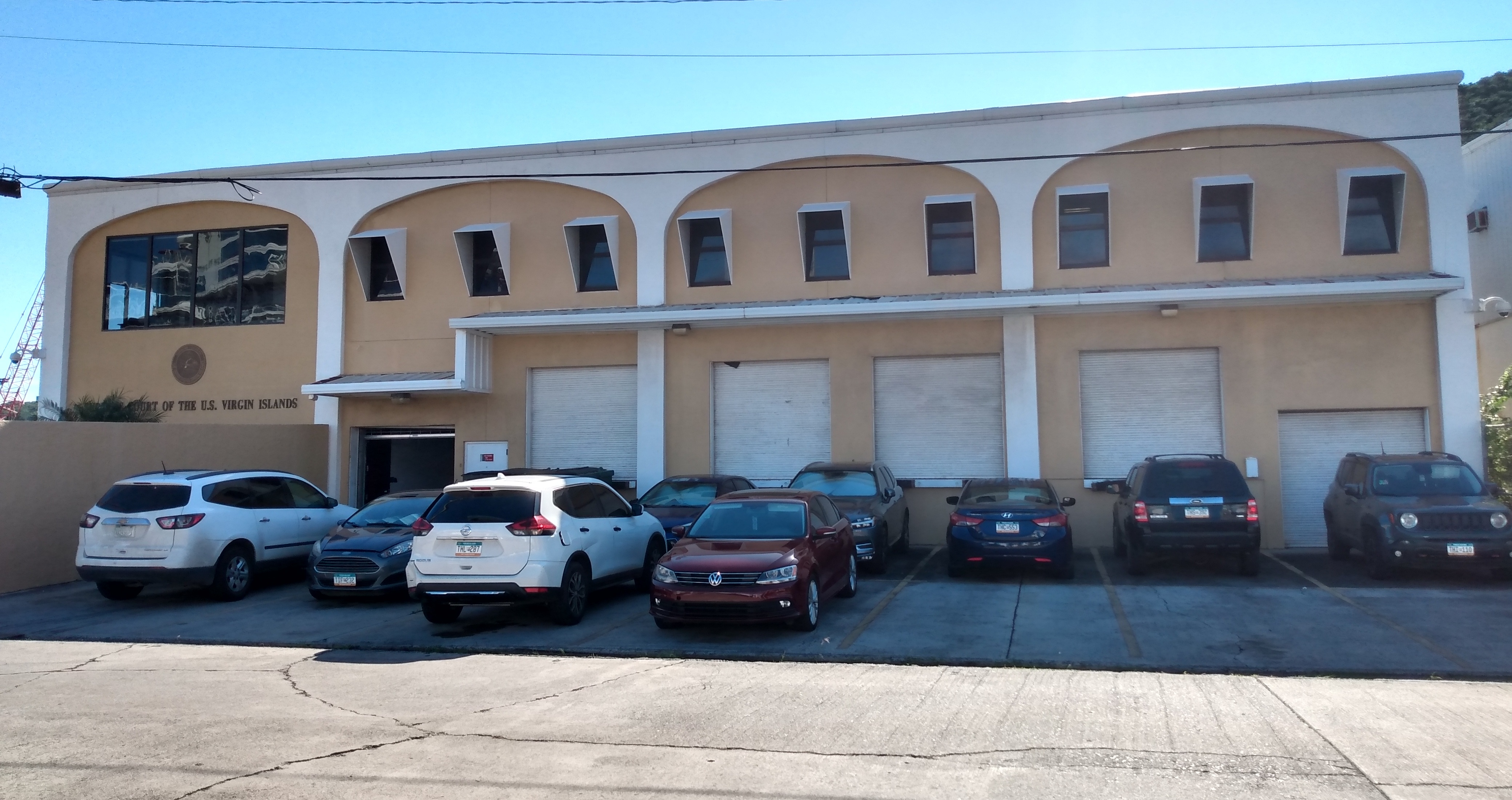
Exterior of the Supreme Court of the Virgin Islands on St. Thomas

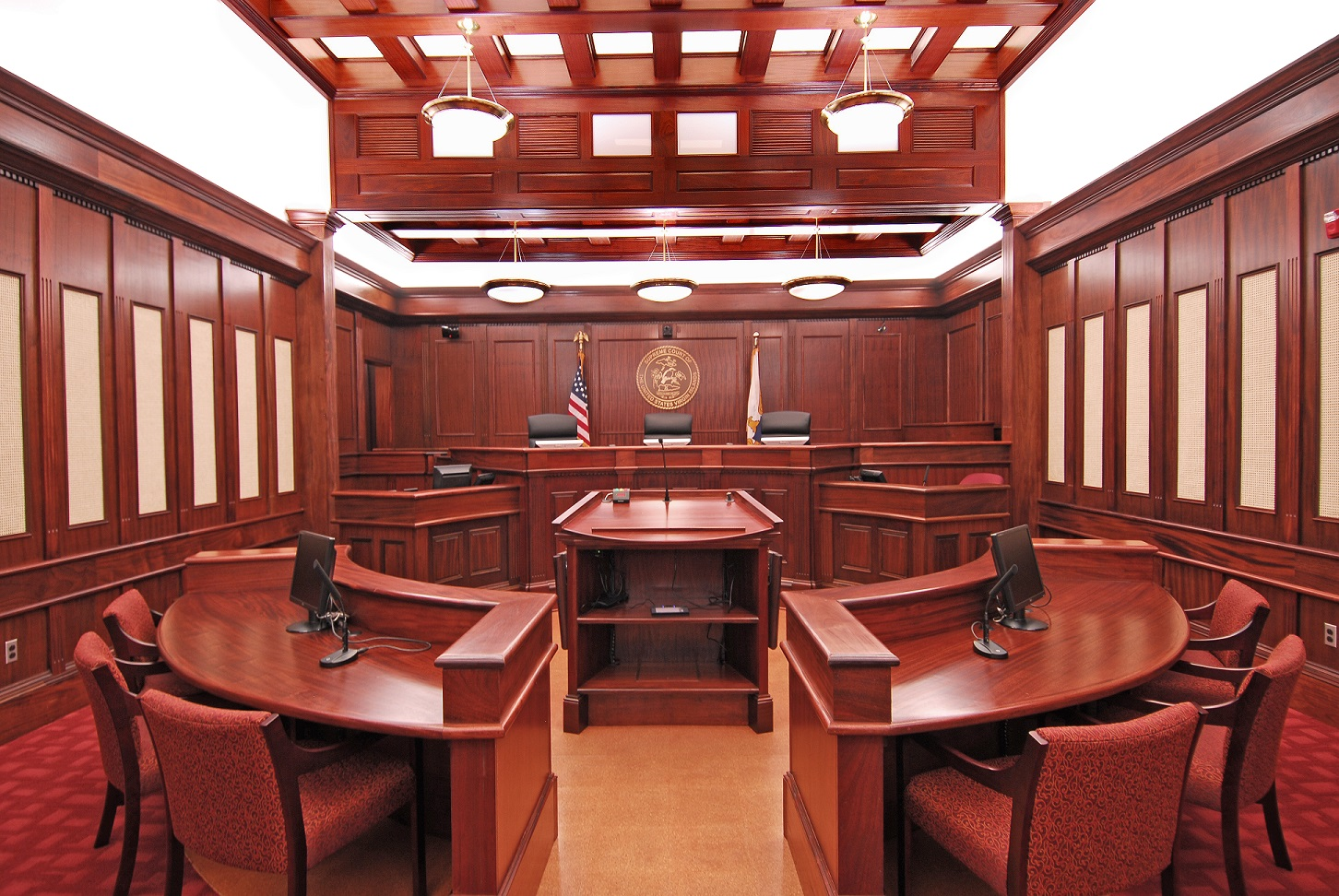
Interior of the Virgin Islands Supreme Court

Although Charlotte Amalie is the anchor town of "the city" of Charlotte Amalie (subdistrict), Charlotte Amalie West is home to the highest division of the judicial branch of the territory. The Supreme Court of the Virgin Islands is located in the Crown Bay area in Charlotte Amalie West. The Supreme Court assumed jurisdiction over all appeals from the Superior Court of the Virgin Islands, a trial level court, on January 29, 2007.

== Education ==
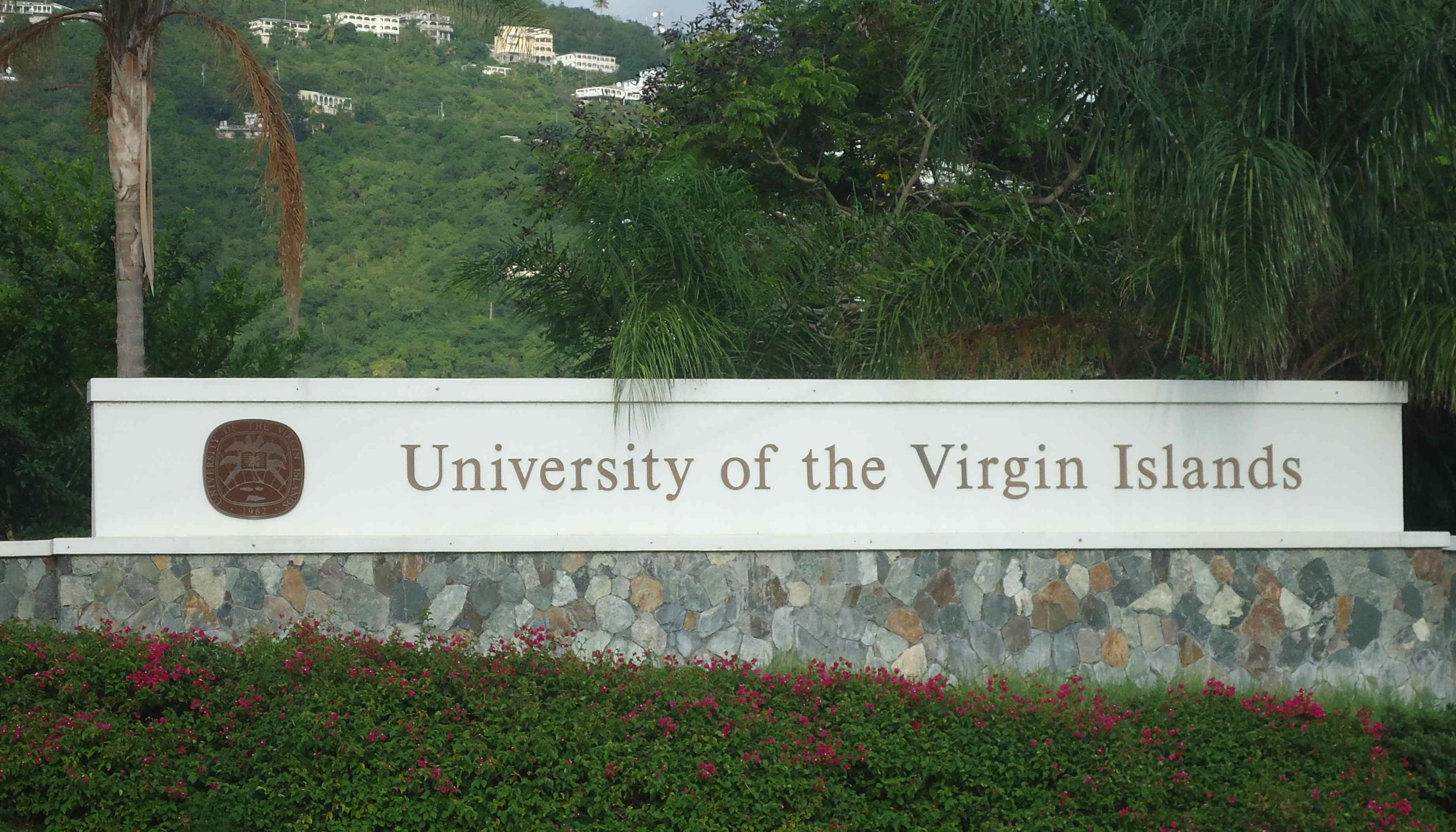
Entrance sign

St. Thomas-St. John School District operates public schools.

Elementary Schools:

- Ulla F. Muller Elementary School

Parochial and Private Schools:

- Moravian School

Universities and Colleges: The University of the Virgin Islands, Orville E. Kean Campus, was founded in 1962. The University of the Virgin Islands provides higher education leading to associate's, bachelor's, master's and PhD degrees, with campuses on St. Thomas and St. Croix.

== Sports ==
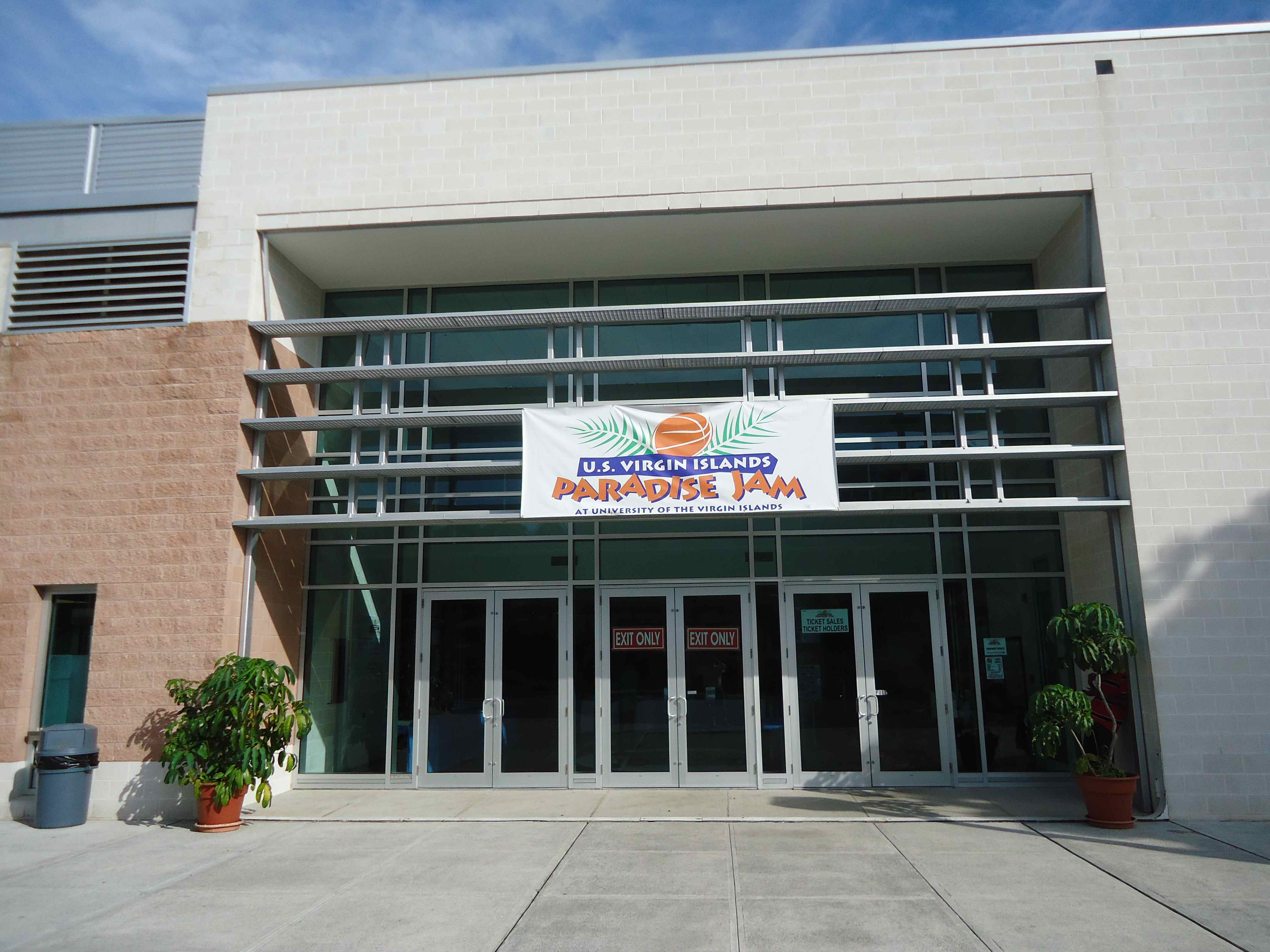
Elridge Wilburn Blake Sports and Fitness Center

The University of the Virgin Islands (UVI) Buccaneers men's and Lady Buccaneers women's athletics teams since 2016 has participated in the National Association of Intercollegiate Athletics (NAIA) college athletics association for colleges and universities in North America. This membership marked a significant step in expanding UVI's athletic program, allowing its teams to compete at a national level against other colleges and universities in various sports. On of July 1, 2023, UVI athletics took another big step and became a member of the Gulf Coast Athletic Conference (GCAC), now the HBCU Athletic Conference (HBCUAC). The university currently competes in three sports, basketball, cross country, and track & field for both men and women.

The UVI men's and women's basketball teams play their home games at the Elridge Wilburn Blake Sports and Fitness Center on the UVI Orville E. Kean Campus. The facility is an indoor sporting arena with a capacity of 3,000 people (the largest on the island).

The arena also serves as the host venue for the United States Virgin Islands Paradise Jam, an in-season college basketball exempt multiple-team event (MTE) tournament.

== Climate ==
Climate data for Charlotte Amalie West
Month	Jan	Feb	Mar	Apr	May	Jun	Jul	Aug	Sep	Oct	Nov	Dec	Year
Mean daily maximum °F (°C)	86 (30)	86 (30)	86 (30)	88 (31)	88 (31)	90 (32)	90 (32)	91 (33)	90 (32)	90 (32)	88 (31)	86 (30)	88 (31)
Mean daily minimum °F (°C)	72 (22)	72 (22)	72 (22)	74 (23)	76 (24)	77 (25)	78 (26)	78 (26)	77 (25)	76 (24)	75 (24)	73 (23)	75 (24)
Average precipitation inches (mm)	1.89 (48)	1.51 (38)	1.52 (39)	2.39 (61)	3.36 (85)	2.35 (60)	2.42 (61)	3.50 (89)	5.34 (136)	5.57 (141)	5.28 (134)	2.74 (70)	37.87 (962)
