= U.S. Virgin Islands Highway 32 =

Highway in the U.S. Virgin Islands

Highway 32
- Highway 32 highlighted in red

Route information
- Maintained by USVI DPW
- Length: 3.9 mi (6.3 km)

Major junctions
- West end: Hwy 38 in Tutu
- Hwy 30 in Nadir
- East end: Hwy 38 in Red Hook

Location
- Country: United States
- Territory: United States Virgin Islands

Highway system
- USVI Highways
← Hwy 30	→ Hwy 33
← Hwy 318	Hwy 322	→ Hwy 332

U.S. Virgin Islands Highway 32 (VI 32) is a primary territorial highway on the island of St. Thomas in the United States Virgin Islands. It runs about 3.9 miles (6.3 km) from VI 38 in Tutu to VI 38 at the Red Hook Ferry Terminal in Red Hook. The highway travels in a southeastern direction between its termini, intersecting VI 30 in Nadir and traveling along the coastline near Benner Bay. VI 32 serves as an access route between Charlotte Amalie and the southeastern areas of St. Thomas.

== Route description ==
VI 32 begins at an intersection with VI 38 in the administrative subdistrict of Tutu. The western terminus is located in a commercialized area with multiple businesses located adjacent to the highway. VI 32 travels southeastward along Mariendahl Road, largely paralleling Nadir Creek. Nearing Nadir, the highway enters a residential area, with many residential buildings located adjacent to the highway. VI 32 intersects VI 30 at a three-way intersection in Nadir. The highway continues southeast for 0.4 miles (0.64 km) until nearing the lagoon, where it turns to the northeast. At the turn, the highway name changes to Red Hook Road. VI 32 continues for 1.5 miles (2.4 km) through Benner until reaching VI 322 in Nazareth. From the intersection, VI 32 continues to the east for 0.5 miles (0.80 km), passing several marinas along Vessup Bay. VI 32 ends at the Red Hook Ferry Terminal, where VI 38 begins and continues to the northeast.

== Junction list ==
Location	mi	km	Destinations	Notes
Tutu	0.0	0.0	Hwy 38	Western terminus
Nadir	1.9	3.1	Hwy 30 west (Frenchmens Bay Road) – Charlotte Amalie	
Nazareth	3.4	5.5	Hwy 322 east	Western terminus of Highway 322
Red Hook	3.9	6.3	Hwy 38 north / Ferry Terminal	Eastern terminus; Southern terminus of Highway 38
1.000 mi = 1.609 km; 1.000 km = 0.621 mi

== Auxiliary routes ==
Highway 322
- Location: Hwy 32, Nazareth
- Length: 1.1 mi (1.8 km)

Highway 322 is a short 1.1 miles (1.8 km) road on St. Thomas, one of the U.S. Virgin Islands. The highway progresses eastward from Highway 32 near the town of Red Hook (in the community of Nazareth), providing access to several Great Bay resorts, including the Ritz-Carlton St. Thomas.

Highway 322 begins at an intersection with Highway 32 (Smith Bay Road) in the community of Nazareth. The highway progresses southeastward through Nazareth, intersecting with Vessup Road in a small residential community. Vessup Road, after leaving Highway 322, progresses on a northward loop and into the Ritz-Carlton on Saint Thomas. The residential community is surrounded by forestry, and Highway 322 consists of the main road, passing more residential homes as Ridge Road. After paralleling Vessup Road for a short distance, the southeastbound highway intersects with Bay Road, where it dips to the south towards Cowpet Bay. At Cowpet Bay, Highway 322 parallels the bay and its shore side homes. After intersecting with Windward Way, the highway turns northward, where maintenance ends at another resort.
