= U.S. Virgin Islands Highway 39 =

Highway in the U.S. Virgin Islands

Highway 39
- Route 39 highlighted in red

Route information
- Maintained by USVI DPW
- Length: 2.2 mi (3.5 km)

Major junctions
- South end: Hwy 38 near Tutu
- Hwy 40
- North end: Hwy 42 near Mahogany Run

Location
- Country: United States
- Territory: United States Virgin Islands

Highway system
- USVI Highways

Highway 39 is a road on St. Thomas, USVI. Starting at Highway 42 near the Mahogany Run Golf Course, it runs in a north–south direction across the eastern portion of the island. After a brief Concurrency with Highway 40, the road ends at Highway 38 a few miles east of Charlotte Amalie.

== Major Intersections ==
Location	mi	km	Destinations	Notes
Hoffman	0.0	0.0	Hwy 38	Southern terminus
	1.1	1.8	Hwy 40	Western end of Highway 40 concurrency
	1.1	1.8	Hwy 40	Eastern end of Highway 40 concurrency
	1.4	2.3	Hwy 394	Eastern terminus of Highway 394
Mandahl	2.2	3.5	Hwy 42	Northern terminus
1.000 mi = 1.609 km; 1.000 km = 0.621 mi: Concurrency terminus

== Auxiliary routes ==
Highway 394
- Location: Hwy 35 – Hwy 39
- Length: 0.9 mi (1,400 m)

Highway 394 is a road on St. Thomas, USVI. The road connects Highways 35 and 39 on the central part of the island.

=== Major Intersections ===
Location	mi	km	Destinations	Notes
	0.0	0.0	Hwy 35	Western terminus
	0.9	1.4	Hwy 39	Eastern terminus
1.000 mi = 1.609 km; 1.000 km = 0.621 mi
