= U.S. Virgin Islands Highway 38 =

Highway in the U.S. Virgin Islands

Highway 38
- Highway 38 highlighted in red

Route information
- Maintained by USVI DPW
- Length: 6.6 mi (10.6 km)

Major junctions
- West end: Hwy 35 in Charlotte Amalie
- Hwy 39 Hwy 32 Hwy 42
- South end: Hwy 32 near Red Hook

Location
- Country: United States
- Territory: United States Virgin Islands

Highway system
- USVI Highways

Highway 38 is a major road on St. Thomas, U.S. Virgin Islands. Starting at Highway 35 in the eastern part of Charlotte Amalie, the road runs in an east–west direction. Along its path, Highway 38 serves as the southern terminus of Highway 39 and Highway 42, and the northern terminus of Highway 32. Past Highway 42, the road turns south and runs along the eastern coast of St. Thomas. Finally, as the road turns back west near Red Hook, its designation changes to Highway 32.

== Auxiliary routes ==
=== Highway 382 ===
Highway 382
- Location: Hwy 38 – Hwy 386
- Length: 0.5 mi (800 m)

Highway 382 is a road on eastern St. Thomas, USVI. It starts at a fork with its parent, Highway 38, passes through a residential area, and ends at Highway 386.

=== Highway 386 ===
Highway 386
- Location: Hwy 38 – Hwy 38
- Length: 1.7 mi (2.7 km)

Highway 386 is a road on eastern St. Thomas, USVI. It forms a loop off of its parent, Highway 38. Like its siblings (Highways 382 and 384), Highway 386 serves a residential area. At 1.7 miles, it is one of the longest secondary routes on St. Thomas.

=== Highway 388 ===
Highway 388
- Location: Off Hwy 38
- Length: 0.7 mi (1,100 m)

Highway 388 is a road on eastern St. Thomas, USVI. It heads east from its parent, Highway 38, and dead-ends at Coki Beach and Coral World Ocean Park less than one mile later.
