= Frydendal, U.S. Virgin Islands =

Coordinates: 18.345788°N 64.872364°W

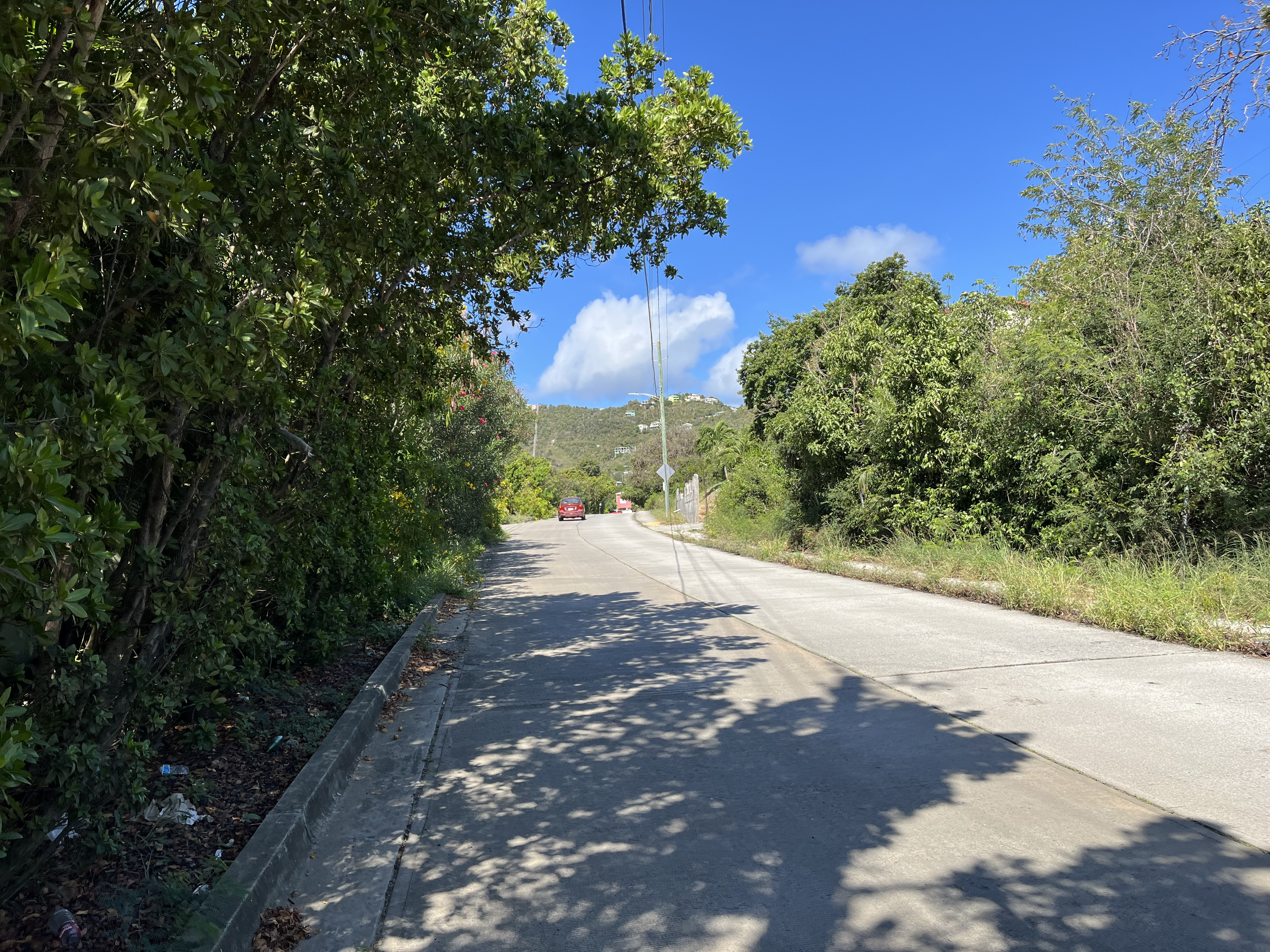
Frydendal

Frydendal is a settlement on the island of St. Thomas in the United States Virgin Islands. It is located in the east of the island.

Coral World Ocean Park and Coki Beach are located in Frydendal.
