= Cas Cay =

Island in the United States Virgin Islands

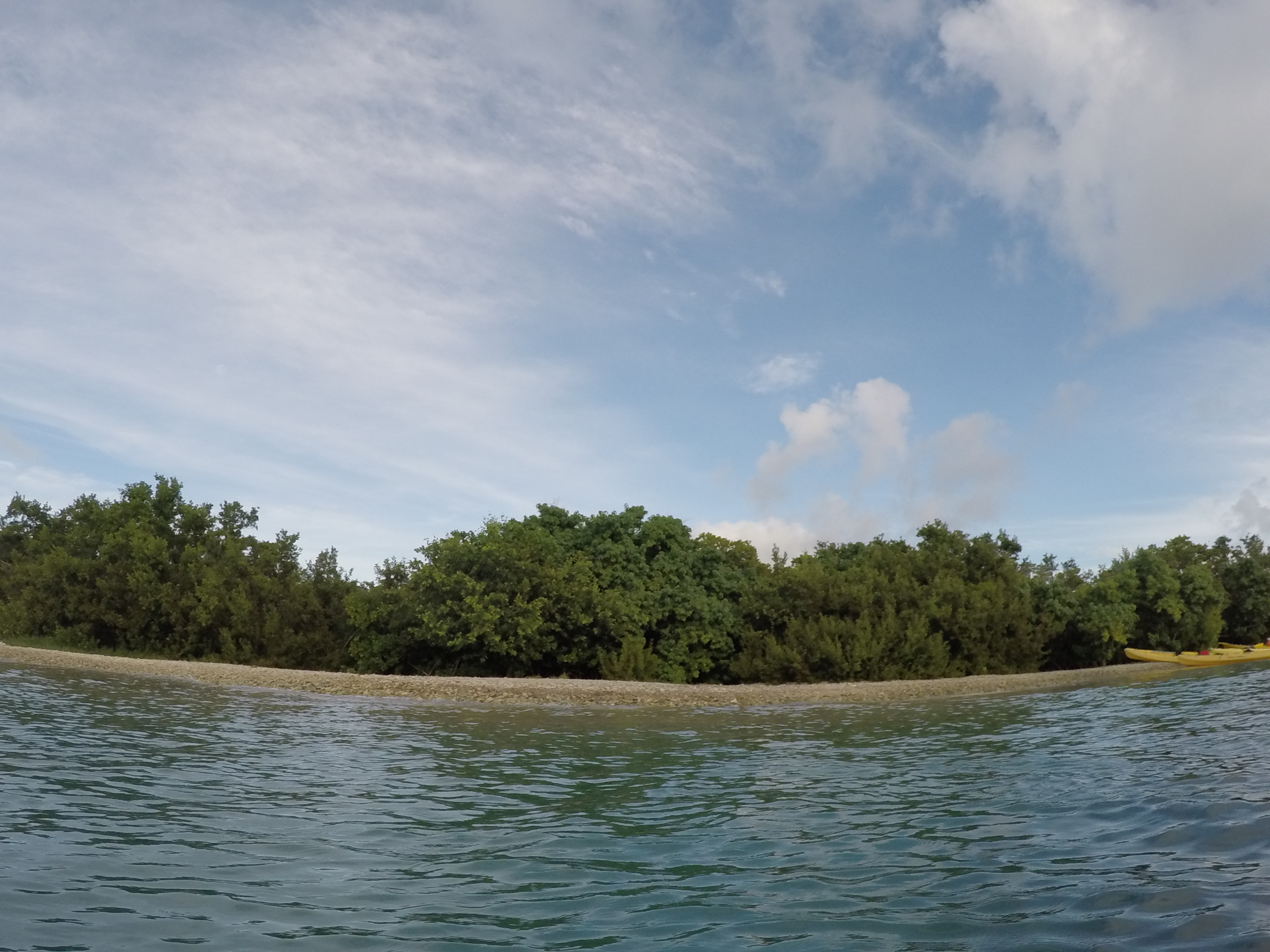
- Cas Cay, 2014

- Location in the Caribbean Cas Cay (the Caribbean)

Geography
- Location: Caribbean Sea
- Coordinates: 18°18′25″N 64°51′55″W
- Area: 50 acres (20 ha)

Administration
- United States; United States Virgin Islands
- Federal Department: U.S. Department of the Interior
- Federal Agency: U.S. Fish and Wildlife Service
- Capital city: Washington, D.C.
- Largest settlement: New York City
- President: Joseph Robinette Biden Jr.

Cas Cay is a fifty-acre (200,000-square-metre) undeveloped island, situated a mile south of Red Hook on the eastern side of Saint Thomas in the United States Virgin Islands. It is under the protection of the Department of Natural Resources. Ferries here depart from Compass Point Marina, right east of Nadir.

== Description ==
Cas Cay is a tropical island, which has a hundred feet tall hill with bird species such as the Red-billed- and White-tailed tropicbird. It is also home to endemic plant species such as orchids, Tabebuia, gumbo-limbos, as well as the seagrape, manchineel and numerous mangroves. It is home to lizards such as anoles, ameiva and geckos. The island has a high density of rats (Rattus rattus) as well. It has a mangrove lagoon and is one of the largest mangrove areas in the Virgin Islands. Besides the mangrove ecosystem, the wildlife sanctuary, the natural whirlpool and blowhole, many visit the island for recreational activities such as snorkeling, scuba diving, kayaking and bird watching. The nearby Cas Cay-Mangrove Lagoon Marine Reserve & Wildlife Sanctuary is located in the Jersey Bay immediately north of Cas Cay.

=== Important Bird Area ===
A 225 ha area, encompassing Cas Cay, neighbouring Bovoni and Patricia Cays, along with the Mangrove Lagoon marine reserve, has been recognised as an Important Bird Area (IBA) by BirdLife International because it supports populations of green-throated caribs, Antillean crested hummingbirds, pearly-eyed thrashers and Lesser Antillean bullfinches.
