= U.S. Virgin Islands Highway 66 =

Highway in the U.S. Virgin Islands

Highway 66
- Melvin H. Evans Highway
- Highway 66 highlighted in red

Route information
- Maintained by USVI DPW
- Length: 9.3 mi (15.0 km)

Major junctions
- West end: Hwy 661 near Frederiksted Southeast
- Hwy 64; Hwy 75 in Clifton Hill
- East end: Hwy 70 / Hwy 681 near Christiansted

Location
- Country: United States
- Territory: United States Virgin Islands

Highway system
- USVI Highways

U.S. Virgin Islands Highway 66 is a major east–west arterial on St. Croix in the United States Virgin Islands and is named the Melvin H. Evans Highway in honor of the territory's first elected governor. It is one of the few divided highways in a territory with the distinction of being the only US jurisdiction to drive on the left. It is also the fastest road on the island—and in the territory—with a 55 mph speed limit for passenger vehicles (except buses) and a 40 mph (64 km/h) limit for heavy trucks and buses. All junctions are at-grade, there are stoplights with connecting roads, and driveway access is limited by default in the territory but the highway is not explicitly classified as an expressway. It is an important intermediate link between locations on the southern coast, including an oil refinery of the Hess Corporation and the Henry E. Rohlsen International Airport, and the island's principal towns Christiansted and Frederiksted. The highway travels through areas of mostly lighter development and has multiple spurs and other intersections connecting to parallel roads and smaller communities. St. Croix has no single encircling route so the highway is one of the most heavily used.

== Major intersections ==
Location	mi	km	Destinations	Notes
	0.0	0.0	Hwy 661 (Hannahs Rest Road)	Western terminus
	3.4	5.5	Hwy 64 (West Airport Road) – Airport	
	6.2	10.0	Hwy 64 (East Airport Road) – Airport	
Clifton Hill	7.7	12.4	Hwy 75	
	9.3	15.0	Hwy 70 / Hwy 681 – Christiansted	Eastern terminus
1.000 mi = 1.609 km; 1.000 km = 0.621 mi
