= U.S. Virgin Islands Highway 37 =

Highway in the U.S. Virgin Islands

Highway 37
- Highway 37 highlighted in red

Route information
- Maintained by USVI DPW
- Length: 2.2 mi (3.5 km)

Major junctions
- South end: Hwy 33 near Fort Christian
- Hwy 40
- North end: End public maintenance at Hull Bay

Location
- Country: United States
- Territory: United States Virgin Islands

Highway system
- USVI Highways

Highway 37 is a road on St. Thomas. Running just over two miles (3 km) from a junction with Highway 33 to the Hull Bay beach, the road's function is to serve the north central part of St. Thomas. When combined with stretches of Highway 404 and Highway 301, it provides a safer but longer route to the west side of the island instead of using the clogged Highway 30 or the mountainous Highway 40 and Highway 33.

== Auxiliary route ==
Highway 379
- Location: Catherineberg Road – Hwy 33
- Length: 0.4 mi (640 m)

Highway 379 is a road on central St. Thomas, USVI. The road heads south from its northern terminus at Highway 33 to end at an unnumbered road in a residential area. Despite being numbered as a spur of Highway 37, Highway 379 does not intersect its parent.
