= U.S. Virgin Islands Highway 30 =

Highway in the U.S. Virgin Islands

Highway 30
- Hwy 30 highlighted in red

Route information
- Maintained by USVI DPW
- Length: 14.5 mi (23.3 km)

Major junctions
- West end: Dead end on western part of St. Thomas
- East end: Hwy 32 in Nadir

Location
- Country: United States
- Territory: United States Virgin Islands

Highway system
- USVI Highways
← Hwy 20	→ Hwy 32
← Hwy 206	301–318	→ Hwy 322

Highway 30 is a major road on St. Thomas, USVI.

== Route description ==
The road begins as Fortuna Road at a dead end on the westernmost part of St. Thomas. Highway 30 starts out heading northwards, but quickly turns east and runs through the quiet western section of the island. After meeting Highway 301, the road heads in a southeasterly direction, passing the University of the Virgin Islands and Cyril E. King Airport (accessed via Highway 302). Soon after the airport, Highway 30 meets Highway 33, a road which serves the northern part of St. Thomas, as well as Highway 308, a road which runs parallel to Highway 30 through the heart of Charlotte Amalie. Highway 30 runs along the Caribbean Sea at this point, and travelers can see the cruise ships docked at Charlotte Amalie's harbor. After leaving the immediate vicinity of Charlotte Amalie and becoming one of the busiest roads on the islands, Highway 30 passes Havensight, a large shopping center. This part of the road is prone to traffic jams, due to a combination of the large number of shoppers, poorly timed lights, and a complex intersection with Highway 313. After passing Havensight, Highway 30 quickly becomes a residential road, with many houses on either side. Finally, the road meets Highway 32 in the town of Nadir and comes to an end.

== Major intersections ==
Location	mi	km	Destinations	Notes
St. Thomas	0.00	0.00	Dead end	Terminus
Charlotte Amalie			Hwy 301	
Charlotte Amalie			Hwy 302 (Airport Road) – Cyril E. King Airport	
Charlotte Amalie			Hwy 33	
Charlotte Amalie			Hwy 313	
Nadir			Hwy 32	Terminus
1.000 mi = 1.609 km; 1.000 km = 0.621 mi

== Auxiliary routes ==
=== Highway 301 ===
Highway 301
- Location: Hwy 33 – Hwy 30, Crown Mountain
- Length: 1.0 mi (1.6 km)

Highway 301 is a short road on St. Thomas, USVI. The purpose of the road is to connect Highway 33 with Highway 30. Currently, if Highway 301 did not exist, travelers would have to travel southeast along Highway 33 to Charlotte Amalie, then back northwest along Highway 30.

=== Highway 302 ===
Highway 302
- Location: Cyril E. King Airport
- Length: 1.2 mi (1.9 km)

Highway 302 is a minor road on St. Thomas, USVI. Its function is to provide access to Cyril E. King Airport.

=== Highway 303 ===
Highway 303
- Location: Hwy 30– Hwy 33, Charlotte Amalie
- Length: 1.2 mi (1.9 km)

Highway 303 is a road on St. Thomas, USVI. Its route takes it up the east side of the University of the Virgin Islands, then through a residential area to Highway 33.

=== Highway 304 ===
Highway 304
- Location: Hwy 302, Cyril E. King Airport – Hwy 30, Charlotte Amalie
- Length: 1.2 mi (1.9 km)

Highway 304 runs from Highway 30 south to Highways 305 and 306, then northwest to Highway 302.

=== Highway 305 ===
Highway 305
- Location: Hwy 306 – Hwy 304, Charlotte Amalie
- Length: 0.2 mi (320 m)

Highway 305 heads southwest from Highway 304 to Highway 306.

=== Highway 306 ===
Highway 306
- Location: Hwy 305 – Hwy 304, Charlotte Amalie
- Length: 0.2 mi (320 m)

Highway 306 runs southeast from Highway 304, past the southern terminus of Highway 305, then dead-ends overlooking the Caribbean Sea.

=== Highway 308 ===
Highway 308
- Location: Hwy 30 – Hwy 314, Charlotte Amalie
- Length: 1.9 mi (3.1 km)

Highway 308 (better known as Dronnigens Gade) is a road on St. Thomas, USVI. Branching off from Highway 30 a few miles west of Charlotte Amalie, Highway 308 runs right through the heart of the town, parallel to Highway 30, which runs along the waterfront. Highway 308 passes Highway 40 and Highway 35 along its route, as well as tourist attractions like Fort Christian. The road ends one block east of Highway 35 at Highway 314, which runs south to Highway 30.

=== Highway 313 ===
Highway 313
- Location: Hwy 30 – Hwy 38, Charlotte Amalie
- Length: 0.3 mi (480 m)

Highway 313 is a minor road on St. Thomas, USVI. It is a de facto eastern bypass of Charlotte Amalie. Highway 313 allows travelers on Highway 30 to access Highway 38 (and vice versa) without using the clogged roads of downtown or cutting through a residential area.

=== Highway 314 ===
Highway 314
- Location: Hwy 30 – Hwy 308, Charlotte Amalie
- Length: 0.4 mi (640 m)

Highway 314 is a minor road on St. Thomas, USVI. It provides access to the eastern part of Charlotte Amalie from Highway 30.

=== Highway 315 ===
Highway 315
- Location: Havensight – Hwy 30, Charlotte Amalie
- Length: 1.0 mi (1.6 km)

Highway 315 is a minor road on St. Thomas, USVI. Its purpose is to serve a large residential development on the east side of St. Thomas Harbor.

=== Highway 318 ===
Highway 318
- Location: Crown Mountain
- Length: 0.7 mi (1,100 m)

Highway 318 is a road on St. Thomas, USVI. It branches off from Highway 30 and serves a few residential dwellings before losing its designation seven-tenths of a mile later.
