= Ford O. Rogers =

U.S. Marine Corps general

Ford Ovid Rogers
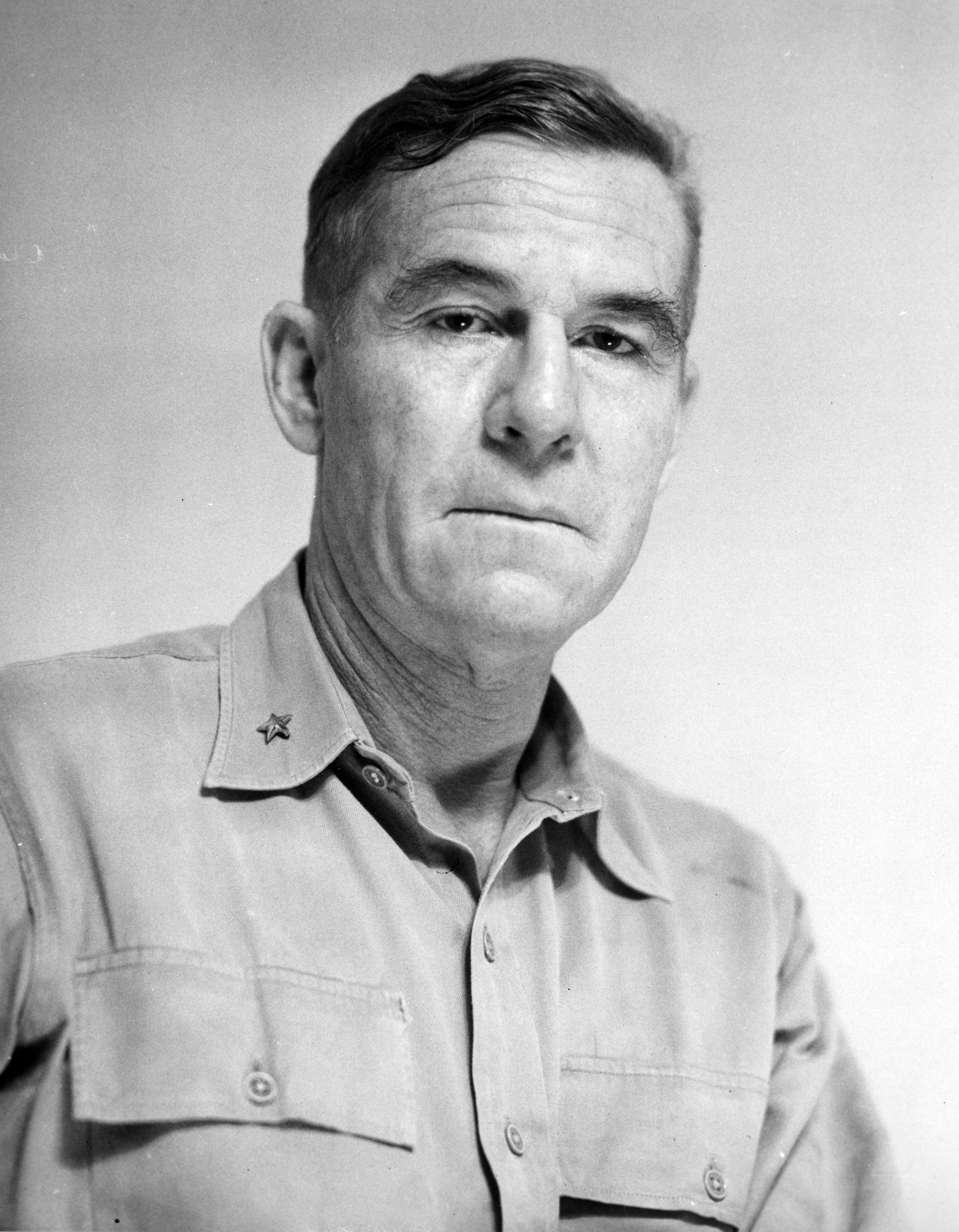
- Born: March 23, 1894; Waco, Texas, US
- Died: September 12, 1972 (aged 78); Bethesda, Maryland, US
- Burial place: Arlington National Cemetery
- Military career
- Allegiance: United States of America
- Branch: United States Marine Corps
- Service years: 1917–1946
- Rank: Major general
- Nickname: "Tex"
- Service number: 0–840
- Commands: 3rd Marine Aircraft Wing
- Conflicts: World War I World War II: Battle of Okinawa
- Awards: Navy Cross; Legion of Merit; Distinguished Flying Cross

Ford Ovid Rogers (March 23, 1894 – September 12, 1972) was a highly decorated naval aviator, who served with the United States Marine Corps, retiring with the rank of major general. He was decorated with the Navy Cross for his World War I service and received a Legion of Merit and a Distinguished Flying Cross for service in World War II.

== Early career ==
Ford O. Rogers was born on March 23, 1894, in Waco, Texas, and was appointed midshipman at United States Naval Academy in Annapolis, Maryland, in 1913. He studied for almost four years, before he dropped out. Subsequently, enlisted as private in the Marine Corps on July 14, 1917, and served with Marine Corps Detachment at Baltimore, Maryland. Rogers was commissioned a second lieutenant in the Marine Corps Reserve on September 15, 1917, and was assigned to the flight training course at Naval Air Station in Miami, Florida. He was designated Naval aviator on April 14, 1918.

He was promoted to the rank of first lieutenant on July 1, 1918, and sent overseas as a member of the Day Wing, First Aviation Force within Northern Bombing Group under the command Major Alfred A. Cunningham. Rogers was later transferred to the USMC Squadron 8 located at Air Field in Oye, France. He subsequently participated in the several bombings missions against enemy bases, aerodromes, submarine bases, ammunition dumps and railroad junctions. He was later decorated with the Navy Cross for this service.

=== Navy Cross Citation ===
Action Date: September – November, 1918
Name: Ford Ovid Rogers
Service: United States Marine Corps
Rank: First lieutenant
Regiment: First Marine Aviation Force
Division: Northern Bombing Group (USN)
Citation: The President of the United States of America takes pleasure in presenting the Navy Cross to First Lieutenant Ford Ovid Rogers (MCSN: 0–840), United States Marine Corps, for distinguished and heroic service as an Aviator of an aeroplane while serving with the First Marine Aviation Force, attached to the Northern Bomb Group (USN), in active operation co-operating with the Allied Armies on the Belgian Front during September, October, and November, 1918, bombing enemy bases, aerodromes, submarine bases, ammunition dumps, railroad junctions, etc.

== Interwar period ==
After the War, Rogers accepted the regular Marine Corps commission, but was assigned to ground duty at Marine Corps Base at Parris Island, South Carolina. He was later transferred to the Marine Corps Base Quantico, Virginia, but this did not suit him well however, and he applied for an aviation unit and was transferred to Carlstrom Field, Florida, for further aviation training.

In January 1922 he served with First Air Squadron at Santo Domingo, where he served during the Dominican Campaign. His job there was to provide air support for Marine ground forces. Towards the end of hostilities Rogers was on leave for Pulitzer Races at St. Louis Flying Field, Missouri. He left Santo Domingo in April 1924.

In May 1925, Rogers was assigned to Naval Air Station Anacostia, Washington, D.C., where he served until September 28, 1925, when he attended Air Corps Tactical School at Langley Field, Virginia, where he graduated following June. In 1927 he participated with two other Marine officers in the Spokane Air Races. He was subsequently assigned to the Headquarters Marine Corps in Washington, D.C., where he served until October 1929, when he was assigned to Marine Squadron 9 and sent to Haiti as Air support for 1st Marine Brigade. He remained in Haiti until August 1931.

His next overseas duty was in Nicaragua, where he was tasked with ferrying of planes to Marines from the aircraft factory at the Philadelphia Navy Yard. Rogers was transferred to Marine Barracks Quantico in June 1934 and served there until July 1938, when he was transferred to Naval Air Station San Diego. In this capacity, he was promoted to the rank of lieutenant colonel on August 14, 1939.

== World War II ==
Shortly before the Japanese Attack on Pearl Harbor, Rogers was transferred to Virgin Islands, where he was appointed commanding officer of the Marine Corps Air Station at St. Thomas. In this capacity, he was promoted to the rank of colonel on May 20, 1942. Colonel Rogers returned to the United States in September 1942 and was decorated with the Navy Commendation Medal for his service at Bourne Field.

In October 1942, Rogers was transferred to Lima, Peru, where he became Chief of United States Naval Aviation Mission. In this capacity he relieved Brigadier General James T. Moore and also served as Main Air Force advisor to the Peruvian president Manuel Prado Ugarteche. In this capacity, Rogers was promoted to the rank of brigadier general in November 1943. He finally returned to the United States in January 1945. Rogers was decorated with the Order of the Sun of Peru, Grade Commander and the Peruvian Aviation Cross, 1st Class by the Government of Peru for his service in Peru.

After his return to his country, Rogers was briefly appointed commanding officer of 3rd Marine Aircraft Wing and then transferred to the staff of Air Defense Command and Fighter Command under the Command of General William J. Wallace. He participated in the Battle of Okinawa as chief of staff of this command.

Rogers was appointed Island Commander of Peleliu on August 7, 1945, when he succeeded Brigadier General Christian F. Schilt. After the atomic bombings of Hiroshima and Nagasaki at the beginning of August, General Rogers showed his own initiative and prepared a surrender document, which was later approved by Vice Admiral George D. Murray, Commander of the Marianas, as the official surrender document within Murray's area of command.

In this capacity, he accepted surrender of Lieutenant General Sadae Inoue, Commander of all Japanese forces in the area, while aboard the destroyer USS Amick on September 2, 1945.

For his service during the final phase of the World War II, Rogers was decorated with the Legion of Merit and the Distinguished Flying Cross. While serving with Air Defense Command and Fighter Command, he also received the Navy Presidential Unit Citation.

General Rogers retired from active service on November 1, 1946, and was promoted to the rank of major general on the retired list for having been specially commended in combat. Major General Ford O. Rogers died on September 12, 1972, in the Naval Hospital in Bethesda, Maryland. He is buried together with his first wife Lucy Bedford Rogers (1899–1927) at Arlington National Cemetery, Virginia.

== Decorations ==
Ribbon bar of Major General Ford Ovid Rogers at retirement:

Naval Aviator Badge
1st Row	Navy Cross			
2nd Row	Legion of Merit	Distinguished Flying Cross	Navy Commendation Medal	Navy Presidential Unit Citation
3rd Row	Marine Corps Expeditionary Medal with two stars	World War I Victory Medal with two battle clasps	American Defense Service Medal	American Campaign Medal
4th Row	Asiatic-Pacific Campaign Medal with one service star	World War II Victory Medal	Commander of the La Orden El Sol del Peru	Peruvian Aviation Cross, 1st Class
