= U.S. Virgin Islands Highway 42 =

Highway in the U.S. Virgin Islands

Highway 42

Route information
- Maintained by USVI DPW
- Length: 3.0 mi (4.8 km)

Major junctions
- West end: Hwy 35 near Magens Bay
- Hwy 39; Hwy 40
- East end: Hwy 38 near Tutu

Location
- Country: United States
- Territory: United States Virgin Islands

Highway system
- USVI Highways

Highway 42 is the highest-numbered main road on St. Thomas, U.S. Virgin Islands. It serves Mahogany Run Golf Course, a major golf course on the island, and provides access to world-famous Magens Bay beach from the eastern part of St. Thomas. Its eastern terminus is with Highway 38 near the town of Tutu, and the road runs exactly 3 miles (5 km) to Highway 35 near Magens Bay.
