= U.S. Virgin Islands Highway 10 =

Highway in the U.S. Virgin Islands

Highway 10
- Center Line Road
- Route 10 highlighted in red

Route information
- Maintained by USVI DPW
- Length: 12 mi (19 km) approximate

Major junctions
- West end: Hwy 20 in Cruz Bay
- Hwy 104 inside Virgin Islands National Park Hwy 108 in Virgin Islands National Park; Hwy 20 in Virgin Islands National Park Hwy 107 in Coral Bay
- East end: Dead end in the East End of St. John

Location
- Country: United States
- Territory: United States Virgin Islands

Highway system
- USVI Highways
← Hwy 7532	→ Hwy 20
← Hwy 85	104–108	→ Hwy 206

Highway 10 (VI 10) is a road on St. John in the U.S. Virgin Islands. Usually referred to as Center Line Road by locals, as it runs through the center of the island, Highway 10 runs from Highway 20 in Cruz Bay across St. John, entering Virgin Islands National Park along the way. Route 10 has three auxiliary routes, Highway 104, Highway 107, and Highway 108.

== Route description ==
The route begins at U.S. Virgin Islands Highway 20 in Cruz Bay. From there, it enter several suburbs and enters Virgin Islands National Park, where the surrounding land is green grass. The route then meets U.S. Virgin Islands Highway 104 along Centerline Road and exits the park. Nearing Coral Harbor, it skims a small shoreline community before reentering the park, ending at a dead end near Round Bay.

== Major intersections ==
Location	mi	km	Destinations	Notes
Cruz Bay	0.0	0.0	Hwy 20 / Ferry Terminal	Western terminus
	1.6	2.6	Entrance to Virgin Islands National Park	
	1.7	2.7	Hwy 104	Northern terminus of VI 104
	4.8	7.7	Hwy 108	Northern terminus of VI 108
	5.7	9.2	Hwy 20	
	7.0	11.3	Exit to Virgin Islands National Park	
Coral Bay	7.1	11.4	Hwy 107	Northern terminus of VI 107
	7.2	11.6	Entrance to Virgin Islands National Park	
	10.0	16.1	Exit to Virgin Islands National Park	
East End	12.0	19.3	Dead End	Eastern terminus
1.000 mi = 1.609 km; 1.000 km = 0.621 mi

== Auxiliary routes ==
=== Highway 104 ===
Highway 104
- Location: Cruz Bay – Virgin Islands National Park
- Length: 3.2 mi (5.1 km)

Highway 104 (Southside Road ) is a road on St. John, USVI. It runs from Highway 10 in Cruz Bay back to Highway 10 inside Virgin Islands National Park. The road serves several resorts on the island's southern shore, most notably the Westin St. John.

=== Highway 107 ===
Highway 107
- Location: Virgin Islands National Park – Hwy 10
- Length: 4.5 mi (7.2 km)

Highway 107 is a road on St. John, USVI. Its northern terminus is near the town of Coral Bay. The road runs almost five miles (making it the longest auxiliary route on the island) from Highway 10 to the southern shores of St. John. Highway 107 serves several towns along the shores of Coral Bay. The paved road ends (and thus loses its number) just inside Virgin Islands National Park; an unpaved road continues about a mile before ending at a trailhead.

=== Highway 108 ===
Highway 108
- Bordeaux Mountain Road
- Location: Bordeaux – Hwy 10, Cruz Bay
- Length: 1 mi (1.6 km)

Highway 108
- Location: Coral Bay – Hwy 107
- Length: 0.6 mi (970 m)

Highway 108 is a short road in St. John, USVI. The road is made up of two paved sections, connected by one unpaved one. The western paved section runs south from Highway 10 to the town of Bordeaux and is one mile (1.6 km) long. The eastern section sets out west from Highway 107 to the end of pavement six-tenths of a mile later. The road serves several residences on the southern part of St. John.
