= U.S. Virgin Islands Highway 20 =

Highway 20
- North Shore Road
- Hwy 20 highlighted in red

Route information
- Maintained by Virgin Islands Department of Public Works
- Length: 6.78 mi (10.91 km) Due to configuration of road, Route 20 is 6.7 miles westbound and 7.2 miles eastbound
- Existed: c. 1952–present

Major junctions
- West end: Hwy 10 in Cruz Bay
- Hwy 206 near Cinnamon Bay
- East end: Hwy 10 in Virgin Islands National Park

Location
- Country: United States
- Territory: United States Virgin Islands

Highway system
- USVI Highways
← Hwy 10	→ Hwy 30
← Hwy 108	Hwy 206	→ Hwy 301

Highway 20, or North Shore Road, is a road on St. John.

== Route description ==
The route begins at Highway 10 in the center of Cruz Bay. Highway 20 runs along the northern shore of St. John, passing through Virgin Islands National Park. The road serves many popular beaches, including Cinnamon Bay and Trunk Bay. The highway travels along the coast for most of its length, and has several turnouts for scenic overlooks. The roadway begins to bend into the center of the island, in the process passing several small houses and buildings. Highway 20 has one auxiliary route along its length, Highway 206.

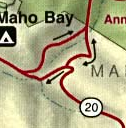
The configuration of the eastern portion of the highway

Highway 20 has an unusual configuration near its eastern terminus. Near Highway 10, the road splits into two. The northern section, carrying eastbound traffic heads toward the eastern shore, but abruptly ends at an unnumbered road. Traffic wishing to continue on Highway 20 must make a 45 degree turn and continue westbound to meet the other stretch of road. Traffic heading west on Highway 20 simply turns left onto the southern branch and rejoins eastbound traffic a short distance later. This discrepancy causes the mileage of the road to change depending on which direction the road is traveled. After passing through the unusual configuration, the roadway proceeds southeastward. It passes through the center of the island, until its reaches its eastern terminus, an intersection with Highway 10 near the island's south shore.

== Major intersections ==
The entire route is located on the island of Saint John.

Location	mi	km	Destinations	Notes
Cruz Bay	0.00	0.00	Hwy 10	Western terminus
Virgin Islands National Park	4.16	6.69	Hwy 206	Northern terminus of VI 206
Virgin Islands National Park	6.78	10.91	Hwy 10	Eastern terminus
1.000 mi = 1.609 km; 1.000 km = 0.621 mi

== Auxiliary route ==
Highway 206
- Location: Hwy 10, Virgin Islands National Park – Hwy 20, Cinnamon Bay
- Length: 1.3 mi (2.1 km)

Highway 206 (John Head Road) is a road on St. John, USVI. It is an auxiliary route of Highway 20. Running just over a mile from Highway 20 south to Highway 10, the road serves a few residential dwellings and as a connector between the two main roads on St. John.
