= U.S. Virgin Islands Highway 40 =

Highway in the U.S. Virgin Islands

Highway 40

Route information
- Maintained by USVI DPW
- Length: 6.9 mi (11.1 km)

Major junctions
- East end: Hwy 42 near Mahogany Run
- Hwy 35 Hwy 37 Hwy 33
- South end: Hwy 308 in Charlotte Amalie

Location
- Country: United States
- Territory: United States Virgin Islands

Highway system
- USVI Highways

Highway 40 is a road on St. Thomas, USVI. Starting at a junction with Highway 42 on the eastern shore of St. Thomas, the road is about seven miles (11 km) long. Highway 40 serves several small towns in the eastern and central parts of St. Thomas. After the junction with Highway 42, the road continues west for a few miles, overlapping Highway 37 along the way, until it turns southward to meet Highway 33. Highway 40 then starts its descent into Charlotte Amalie. It enters the town on Gamle Norsidevei, until it meets Prindsesse Gade, which is one-way westbound. Traffic is directed onto Prindsesse to Nye Norsidevei, which is one-way southbound, which then meets Dronnigens Gade (Highway 308). Traffic on Dronnigens Gade wishing to access Highway 40 must turn right on General Gade, left on Prindsesse, and finally right onto Gamle Norsidevei.

== Auxiliary routes ==
Highway 404
- Location: Hwy 40 – Hwy 37
- Length: 1.1 mi (1.8 km)

Highway 404 is a road on St. Thomas, USVI. It heads north from its parent, Highway 40, to meet Highway 37 in the northern part of the island.
