= Nazareth, U.S. Virgin Islands =

Town in United States Virgin Islands, US

Coordinates: 18°19′15″N 64°51′18″W

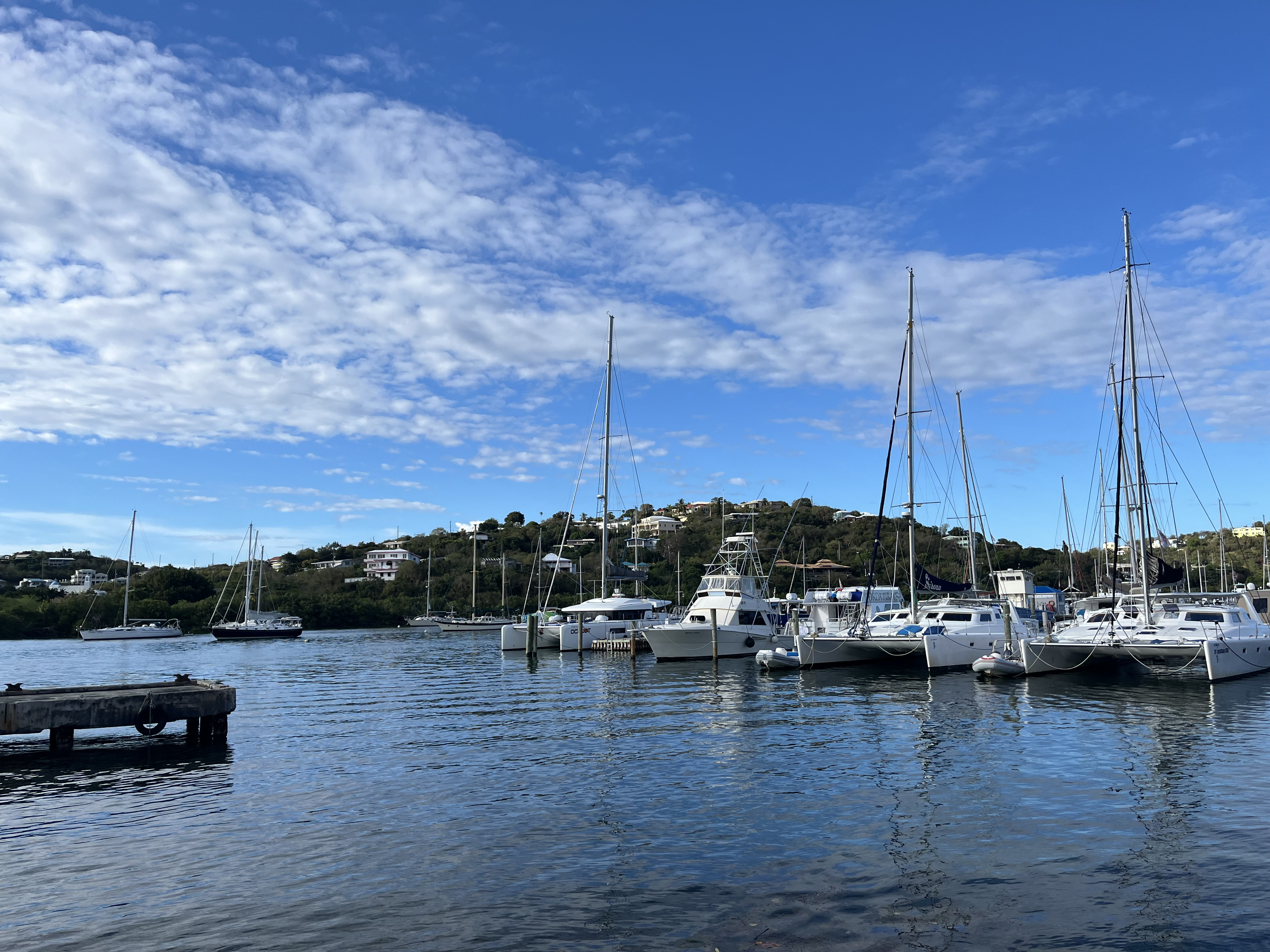
View of Nazareth

Nazareth is a settlement on the eastern side of Saint Thomas in the United States Virgin Islands.

Ivanna Eudora Kean High School, formerly known as Nazareth Bay, is located in Nazareth.

Virgin Islands Montessori School & Peter Gruber International Academy is located in Nazareth.
