= List of United States Virgin Islands highways =

United States Virgin Islands Highways
- Sample highway markers for USVI Highways

System information
- Maintained by USVI Department of Public Works

Highway names
- USVI: Highway X (Hwy X)

Below is a list of highways in the United States Virgin Islands (USVI). US Virgin Islands code places responsibility for highways in the territory to the USVI Department of Public Works.

== Highway and Route Location ==
In the USVI, highways which begin with the numbers 1-2 are located on the island of St. John, 3-4 are located on St. Thomas, and 5-8 are located on St. Croix.

== Major Highways and Routes ==
Major highways and routes on all islands are two digit numbers and end in 0 (examples: 10, 20, 30, 40, 60, 70, and 80). The only exception to this rule is Highway 66 (Melvin Evans Highway) on St. Croix. Other major roads are assigned two digits numbers and end with a number other than 0 (example: 38).

== Spurs and Connectors ==
Three digit numbers are assigned to highways and routes that are spurs or connectors (examples: 308 and 313). The first and second digits indicate what highway they start at (example: 308 start at 30). The only exceptions to this rule are connectors with a middle digit of 1 (example: 313 connect 30 to 38 and there is no route 31) and Route 379 on St. Thomas that never touch Route 37.

== End to End Travel ==
For the most part, highways and routes ending with an odd number are predominantly north to south displacement from end to end. Similarly, for the most part, highways and routes ending with an even number are predominantly east and west displacement from end to end.

Unlike elsewhere in the U.S., traffic in the USVI drives on the left.

== Highways on St. John ==
- Highway 10
- Highway 20
- Highway 104
- Highway 107
- Highway 108
- Highway 206

== Highways on St. Thomas ==
- Highway 30
- Highway 32
- Highway 33
- Highway 35
- Highway 37
- Highway 38
- Highway 39
- Highway 40
- Highway 42
- Highway 301
- Highway 302
- Highway 303
- Highway 304
- Highway 305
- Highway 306
- Highway 308
- Highway 313
- Highway 314
- Highway 315
- Highway 318
- Highway 322
- Highway 332
- Highway 333
- Highway 334
- Highway 379
- Highway 382
- Highway 384
- Highway 386
- Highway 388
- Highway 394
- Highway 404

== Highways on St. Croix ==
- Highway 58
- Highway 60
- Highway 62
- Highway 63
- Highway 64
- Highway 65
- Highway 66
- Highway 68
- Highway 69
- Highway 70
- Highway 72
- Highway 73
- Highway 74
- Highway 75
- Highway 76
- Highway 78
- Highway 79
- Highway 80
- Highway 81
- Highway 82
- Highway 83
- Highway 85
- Highway 622
- Highway 624
- Highway 661
- Highway 663
- Highway 669
- Highway 681
- Highway 682
- Highway 701
- Highway 702
- Highway 704
- Highway 705
- Highway 707
- Highway 708
- Highway 751
- Highway 752
- Highway 753
- Highway 763
- Highway 765
- Highway 7010
- Highway 7013
- Highway 7532
