= Bourne Field =

Defunct military airstrip in St. Thomas

Marine Corps Air Facility St. Thomas, Virgin Islands
- Bourne Field
- St. Thomas, US Virgin Islands in the United States
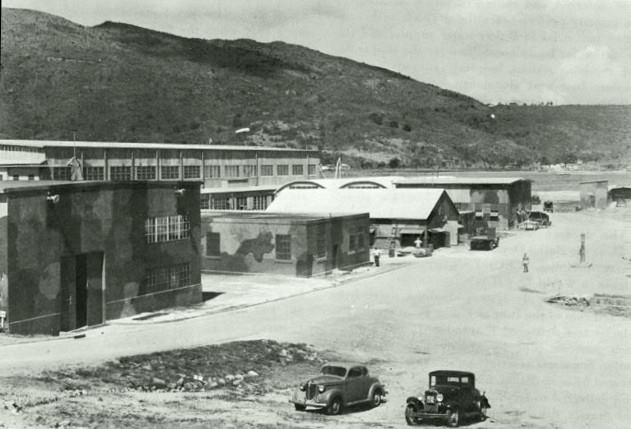
- Elevated view of Bourne Field showing a portion of one runway and hangar.

Site information
- Type: Marine Corps Air Facility
- Owner: 1935: Department of Defense 1950: Department of Interior 1954: US Virgin Islands Corporation
- Operator: 1935: US Navy; 1948: US DoI
- Condition: Decommissioned

Location
- Location in the United States
- Coordinates: 18°20′14″N 064°58′24″W

Site history
- In use: Military: 1935 - 1948; Civilian: 1928-1935, 1948-present
- Fate: Converted to Cyril E. King Airport

Garrison information
- Occupants: VMS-3

Airfield information
Runways
Direction	Length and surface
E/W	4,800 feet (1,463 m) paved
N/S	1,600 feet (488 m) unpaved

Bourne Field was a US Marine Corps Air Facility (MCAF) located on St. Thomas, a part of the US Virgin Islands. Throughout its service, it was known as Navy Operating Base, St. Thomas, MCAS St. Thomas, and MCAF St. Thomas, Virgin Islands. The previously civilian airstrip was acquired by the US government and operated as a military base between 1935 and 1948, then returned to civilian use.

== History ==
The airstrip was located in a swamp 5 miles from Charlotte-Amalie on St. Thomas, an island that is part of the US Virgin Islands and located within the West Indies. Originally known as Mosquito Bay, the field was the first airport to service the island of St. Thomas, with the first passengers arriving in 1928.

The airstrip was taken over by the US government on September 1, 1935, and renamed Bourne Field, after Major Louis T. Bourne, the first person to fly non-stop from the United States to Nicaragua. It served as a training airstrip for the US Marine Corps, originally made up of two 1,600-foot (490 m) long unpaved runways. Assigned to Bourne was the VO-9M observation squadron, a part of Aircraft One of the United States Fleet Marine Forces. In 1936, the squadron was re-designated as VMS-3 (Marine Scouting Squadron 3), operating the Vought SU-2 Corsair.

On 30 October 1939 the US Navy awarded a contract for the development of San Juan, Puerto Rico, which initially included 44 individual projects. Over the next few years, the contract would include the construction of Isla Grande Naval Air Station and various supporting facilities, including a hospital and administrative buildings. In July 1940, the contract was updated to include the expansion of Bourne and the military radio station and submarine base on St. Thomas. The contract called for Bourne to be able to service a permanent 18-plane Marine squadron and an additional patrol-plane squadron serviced through tender ships in nearby Lindbergh Bay. One runway was lengthened to 4,800 feet (1,500 m) and serviced by an enlarged hangar, new stores, quarters, commissary, and a 60-bed hospital. To support seaplanes, a hangar, ramp, and equipment shop were built. By the end of the year, 140 US Marines were stationed at the base. Construction costs exceeded US$2 million. On 1 December 1941, the base was renamed MCAF (Marine Corps Air Facility) St. Thomas, Virgin Islands.

Following a review of the various construction projects, the US Navy changed the requirements of the contract and required additional work to be done at Bourne which would allow it to operate two Marine squadrons and 6 patrol seaplanes. More barracks, stores, and other crew facilities were added to the contract to support the larger number of aircraft. By the end of construction, Bourne hosted four barracks which provided living space for 740 personnel, and 74 housing units. In 1942, the contract was updated for the last time. The long runway was paved, and oil tanks were added with the capacity for 100,000 gallons of gasoline and 135,000 barrels of diesel oil. On 4 March 1943 the air station was merged with the nearby Navy Operating Base, St. Thomas, and redesignated as such.

On 11 June 1943 the 260-man strong Construction Battalion Maintenance Unit 507 arrived on the island to supplement the civilian contractors. The contract was canceled on 26 June, leaving the Navy to finish construction and maintenance of the base. On 1 July 1944, The base was redesignated as MCAS (Marine Corps Air Station) St. Thomas, merging with the nearby seaplane base at Lindbergh Bay and an emergency runway on Anguilla Island.

At the start of the Second World War, VMS-3 (nicknamed the Devilbirds) operated the J2F-A Duck utility aircraft, which was replaced by the OS2N-1 Kingfisher in 1942; the Kingfisher was replaced by the SBD scout dive-bomber in 1944. In May 1944, the unit was deactivated. The purpose of the squadron was to maintain an anti-submarine patrol between Puerto Rico and Martinique, however the diminishing activity of German U-boats made the base redundant.

In June 1944, most of the base's supplies were relocated to the Pacific, where there was a greater demand for equipment. By 1946, the facility was designated as "caretaker status" and operations were handed over to airlines for civilian service. The base was redesignated for the last time as MCAF St. Thomas, Virgin Islands on 8 August 1947, and decommissioned on February 16, 1948. The airport was then leased to the US Department of the Interior for civilian use, with the Navy reserving the power to reactivate the airport for military purposes. After the transfer, the former hangar was converted into the civilian terminal and named after President Harry S. Truman. The airport operates as the Cyril E. King Airport, a civilian facility servicing St. Thomas.

On 25 March 1950 the Department of the Interior leased the land to the US Virgin Islands. However, the department canceled the lease on 1 July 1954 citing violations of the agreement whereby the US Virgin Islands failed to register and report financial transactions relating to the land; the property was given to the US Virgin Islands Corporation.

== Commanding officers ==
Bourne Field commanding officers:

Start	End	Name	Image
Pre-war	24 June 1942	Lieutenant Colonel Ford Rodgers	
25 June 1942	20 June 1944	Lieutenant Colonel Harold Major	
21 June 1944	2 September 1945	Captain Rodgers Humphreys	

== Gallery ==
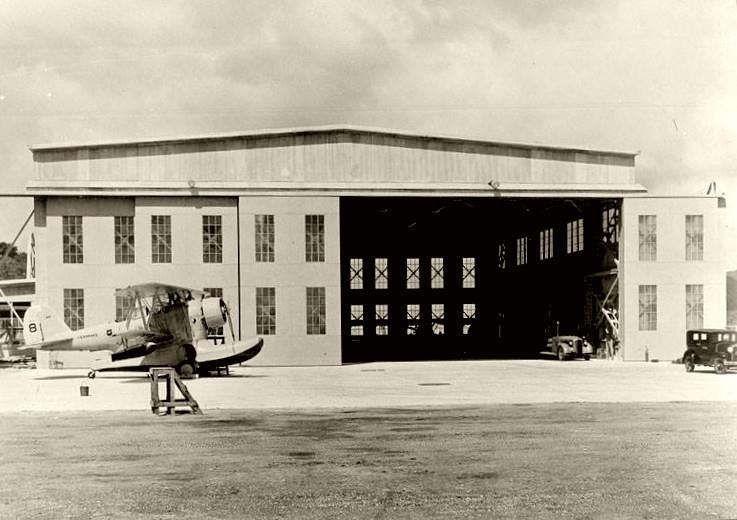
Bourne Field's main hangar with a J2F observation aircraft in front.

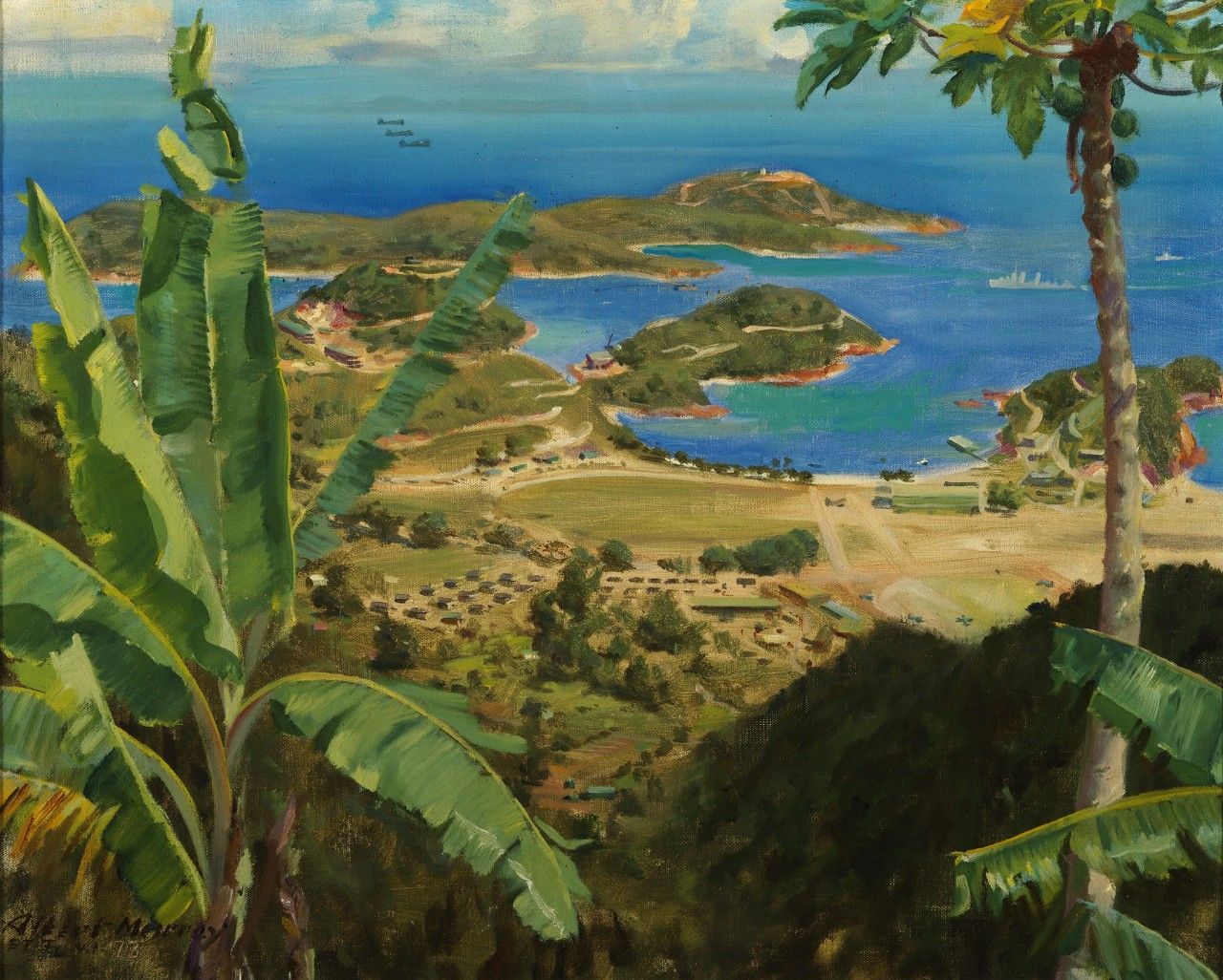
Painting of Bourne Field, showing the nearby bays and runways.
