= Coral World Ocean Park =

Marine park in Saint Thomas, U.S. Virgin Islands

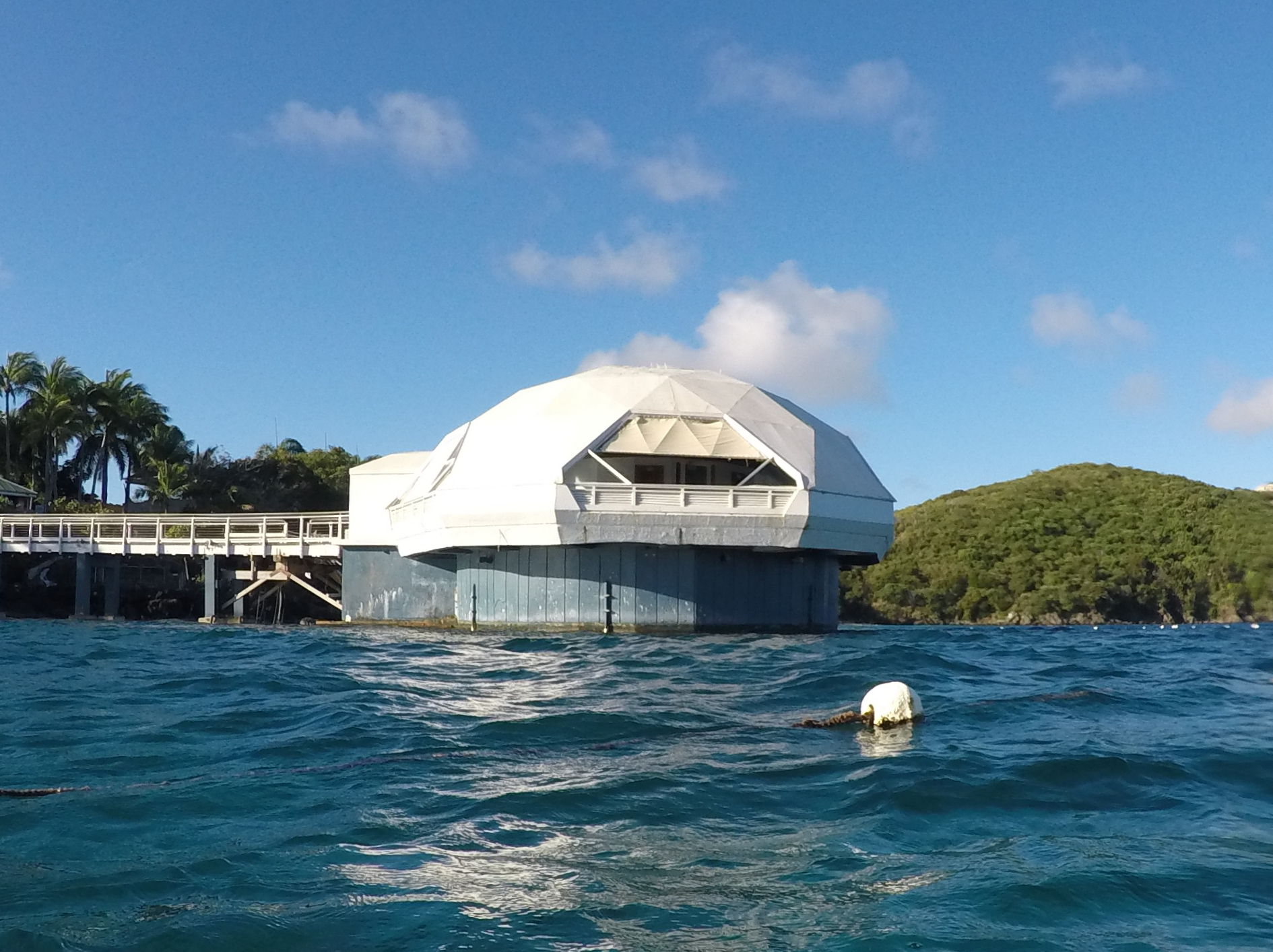
- Coral World Undersea Observatory Tower
- Interactive map of Coral World Ocean Park
- 18.3490241°N 64.8650489°W
- Date opened: 1978
- Location: Saint Thomas, U.S. Virgin Islands
- Volume of largest tank: 80,000 US gallons (303,000 L)
- Website: www.coralworldvi.com

Coral World is a marine park and tourist attraction located next to Coki Beach on the East End of St. Thomas, U.S. Virgin Islands.

== Facilities and attractions ==
Since its opening in 1978, the park has featured a signature Underwater Observatory Tower. The tower descends 20 feet (6.1 m) into the ocean to allow underwater viewing. Later additions to the park include an 80,000 US gallons (303,000 L) circular Caribbean Reef Encounter tank, which houses local fish and other sea life, and an enclosure for South American sea lions. The park uses an open-water system to circulate ocean water through the exhibits.

Other park animals include sea turtles, stingrays, juvenile sharks, seahorses, sea stars, conch, sea cucumbers, iguanas, and lorikeets. Many of the animals, such as the turtles, are rescued from the wild and released when possible.

The park focuses on visitor education and interaction with the animals, through touch encounters, feedings, swims, snuba, and Sea Trek.

== History ==
Coral World opened in 1978, as Coral World International's second marine park, following Coral World Underwater Observatory in Eilat, Israel.

In 1989 it was destroyed by Hurricane Hugo.

In 1995 another storm, Hurricane Marilyn, destroyed the observatory and other tanks. Coral World was sold to new owners more than a year later.

During the 1990s, Coral World hired former world boxing champion Julian Jackson as a celebrity tour guide, to attract more tourists to the park.

In 2007 the park added sea lions.

In 2012 Coral World proposed adding a controversial dolphin swim attraction.

In 2017 Hurricane Irma and Hurricane Maria caused an estimated $2 million in damage to the park.

In 2018 Coral World began construction of an in-ocean dolphinarium.

== Gallery ==
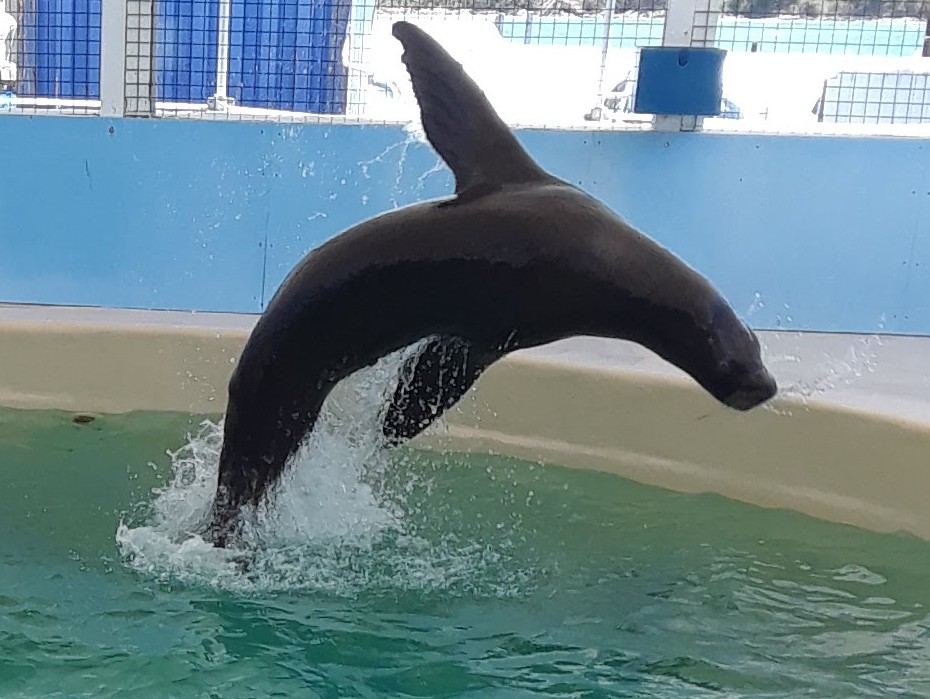
Sea lion Remo jumping at Coral World

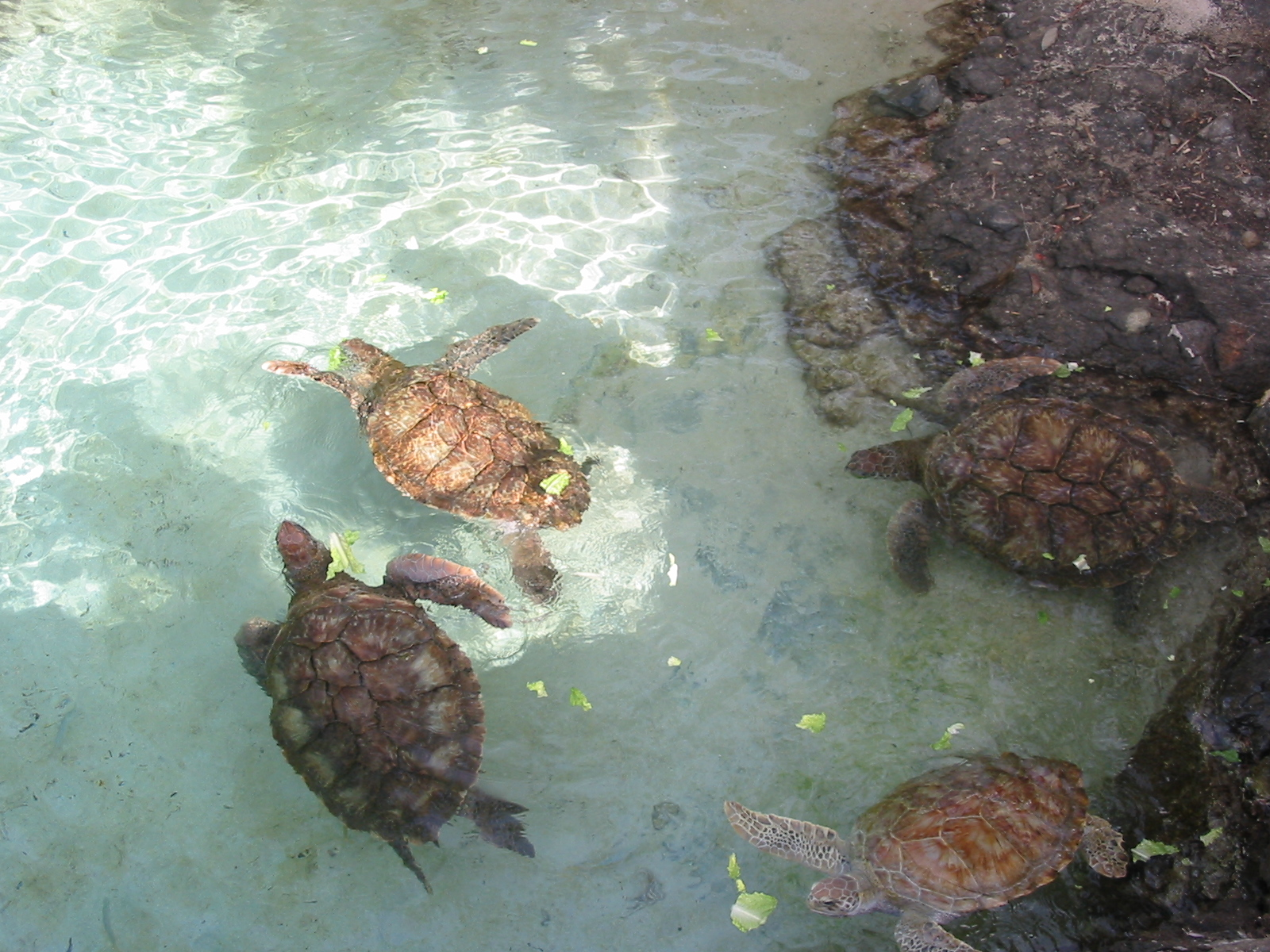
Sea turtles feeding at Coral World
