= U.S. Virgin Islands Highway 33 =

Highway in the U.S. Virgin Islands

Highway 33
- Highway 33 highlighted in red

Route information
- Maintained by USVI DPW
- Length: 7.0 mi (11.3 km)

Major junctions
- West end: Hwy 30 in Frenchtown
- Hwy 40
- East end: Hwy 35 near Fort Christian

Location
- Country: United States
- Territory: United States Virgin Islands

Highway system
- USVI Highways

Highway 33 is a road on St. Thomas in the U.S. Virgin Islands. It runs from Highway 30 near Frenchtown and takes a northerly path toward Crown Mountain. The road takes a circuitous route around the mountain; the route initially bypasses it to the west, then swings east and follows the mountain's north side. Highway 33 then intersects Highway 333, which provides access to St. Thomas' north and east sides, and it takes a southeasterly turn to meet Highway 40. Highway 33 continues east-southeast, intersecting Highway 379 before ending at Highway 35.

== Notes ==
Highway 33 takes a long path around three sides of Crown Mountain. This section can be bypassed by a short stretch of Highway 332 and Highway 405; however, those roads are rather twisty and can be dangerous, which may be why the longer piece of road was designated Highway 33.

== Auxiliary routes ==
=== Highway 332 ===
Highway 332
- Location: Hwy 33 – Hwy 40, Charlotte Amalie
- Length: 1.1 mi (1.8 km)

Highway 332 is a spur route of Highway 33 on St. Thomas. The road provides a link from Highway 33 to Highway 40, connecting two major north–south roads out of Charlotte Amalie.

=== Highway 333 ===
Highway 333
- Location: Hwy 33, Crown Mountain – Hwy 404, Hull Bay
- Length: 0.8 mi (1,300 m)

Highway 333 is a road on St. Thomas. It provides a connection from Highway 33 north to Highway 404. It also allows travelers to access Hull Bay from the west side of the island.

=== Highway 334 ===
Highway 334
- Location: Hwy 33 – Hwy 40
- Length: 0.3 mi (480 m)

Highway 334 is a road on St. Thomas. It provides a connection from Highway 40 west to Highway 33 as they head towards the capital of the territory, Charlotte Amalie.
