= Coki Beach =

Caribbean beach

Coordinates: 18.3495°N 64.866°W

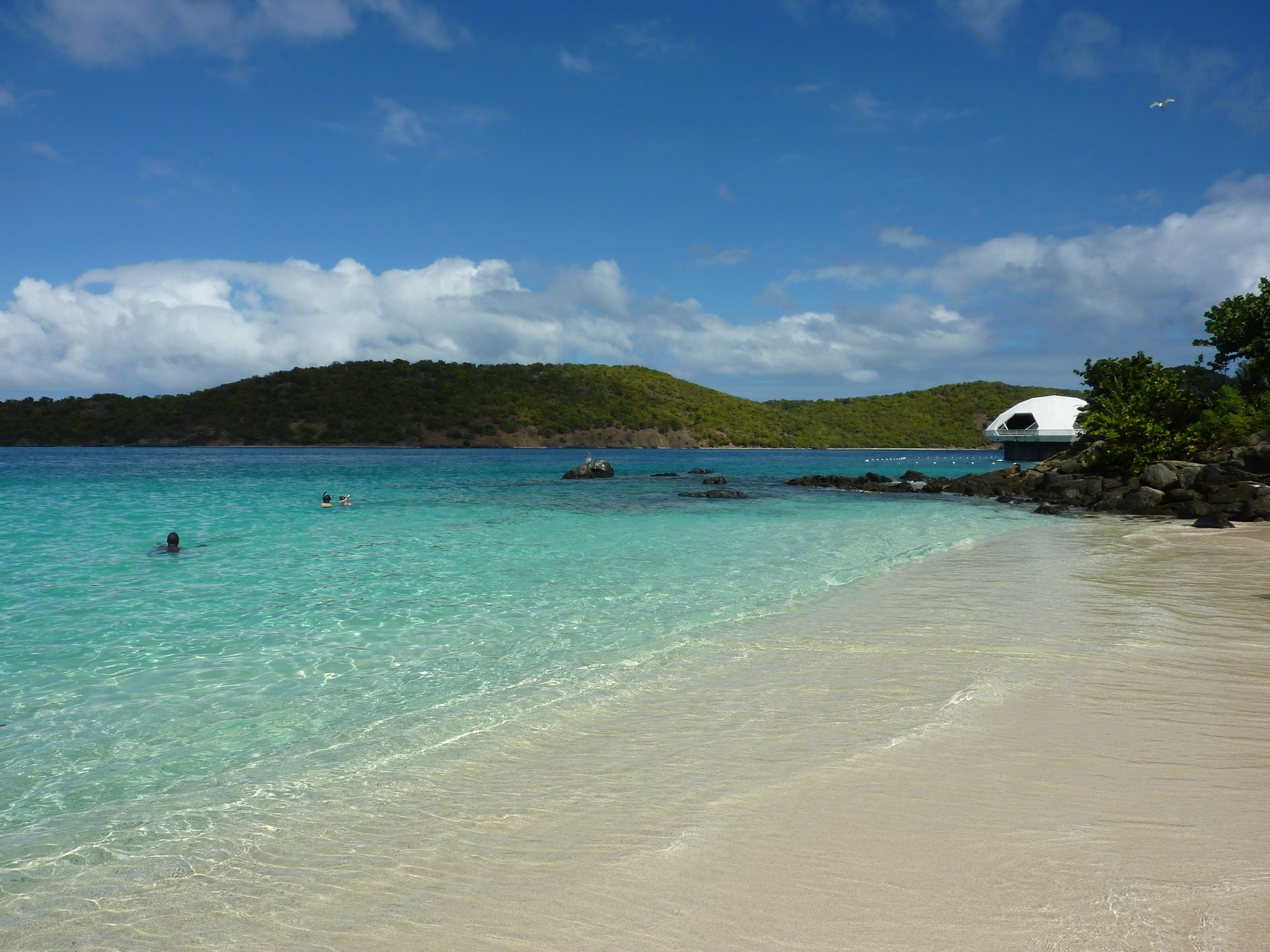
Coki Point Beach, with Coral World observatory tower and Thatch Cay in the distance

Coki Point Beach is on the island of Saint Thomas, United States Virgin Islands, in the Caribbean.

Coki Point Beach is a white sand beach on the northeast (Atlantic) side of the island of Saint Thomas, adjacent to the Coral World Ocean Park. Coki is well known for snorkeling, and is generally considered the best shore snorkel on the island. The beach is a popular tourist site, and taxi service is frequent. Vendors sell a variety of goods, including food, drinks, and crafts, and offer services such as hair braiding. In 2011, a boardwalk and bathhouse were added to the beach. There is also a dive center on the beach which rents snorkel and scuba diving gear and offers guided dives.

== Gallery ==
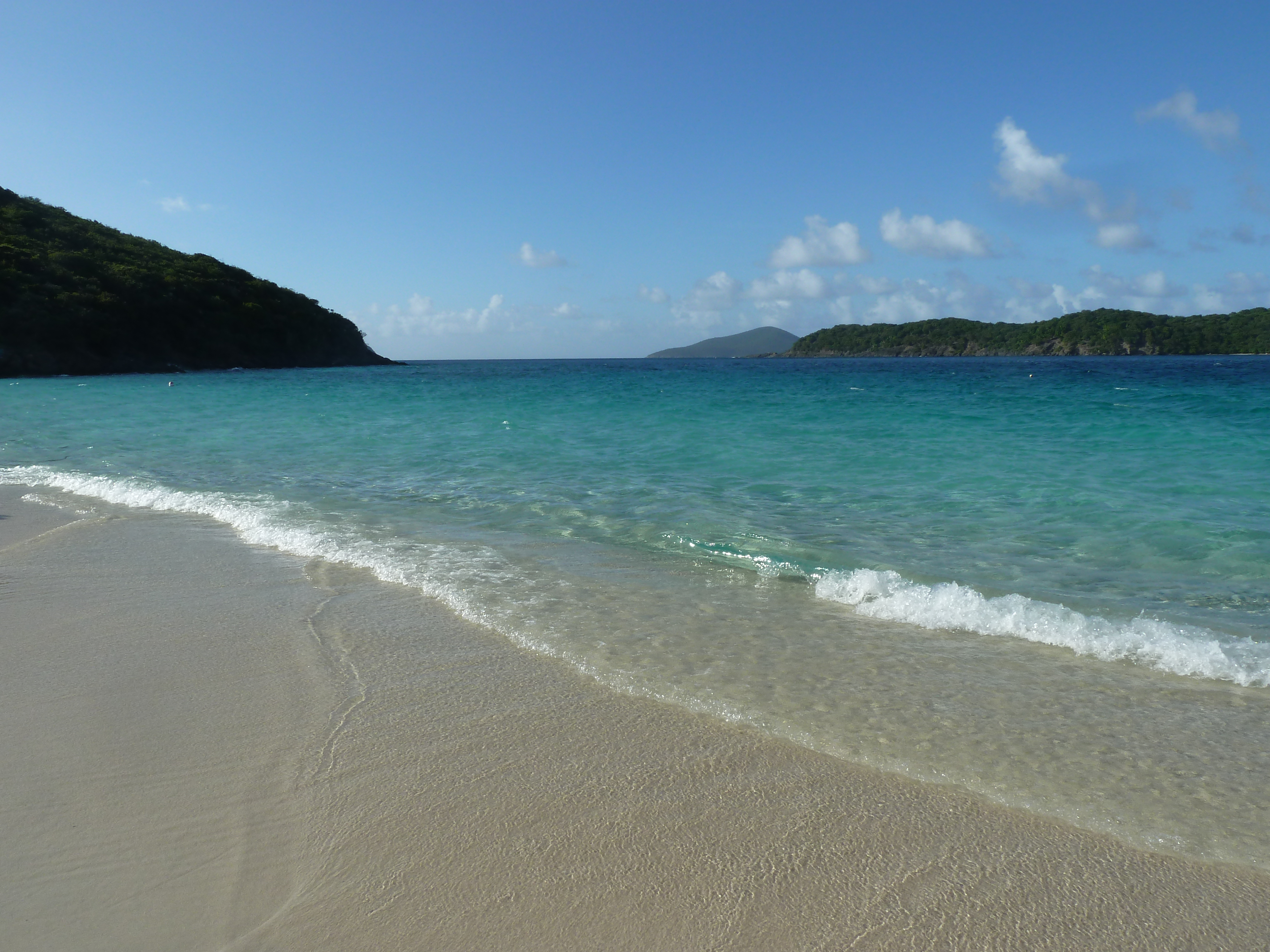
Coki Beach, facing northwest.

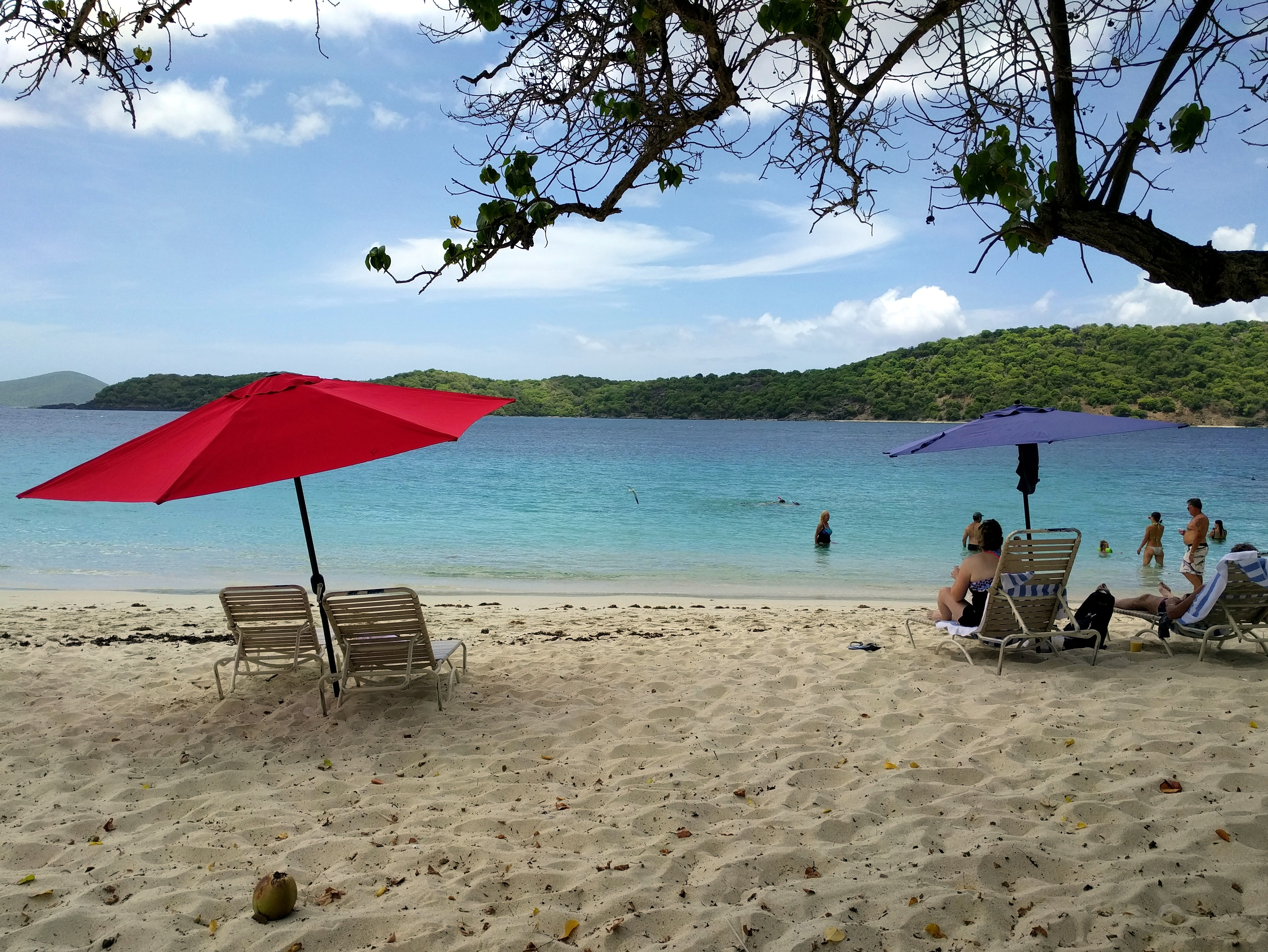
Umbrellas at Coki Beach.

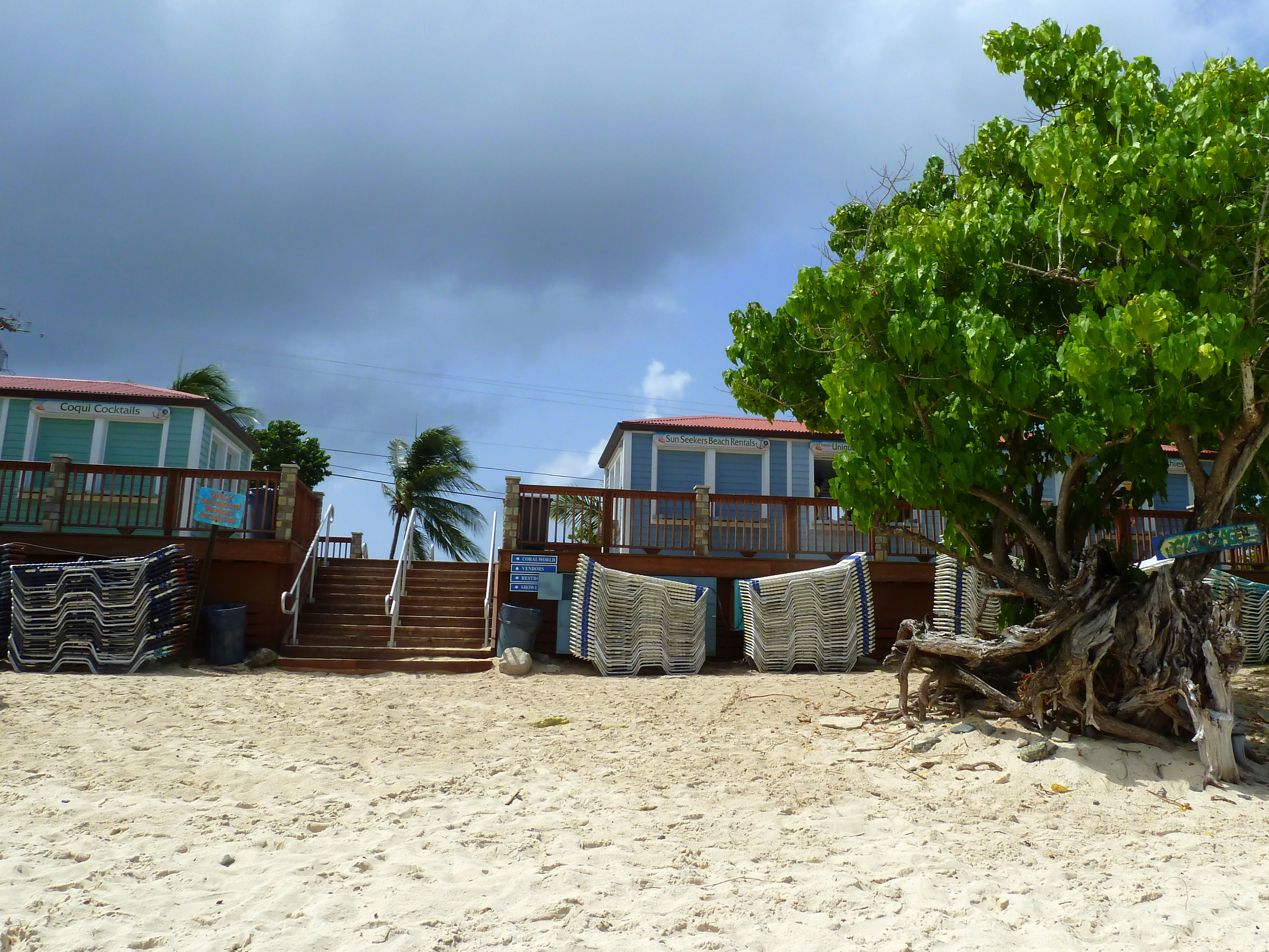
Boardwalk at Coki Beach.

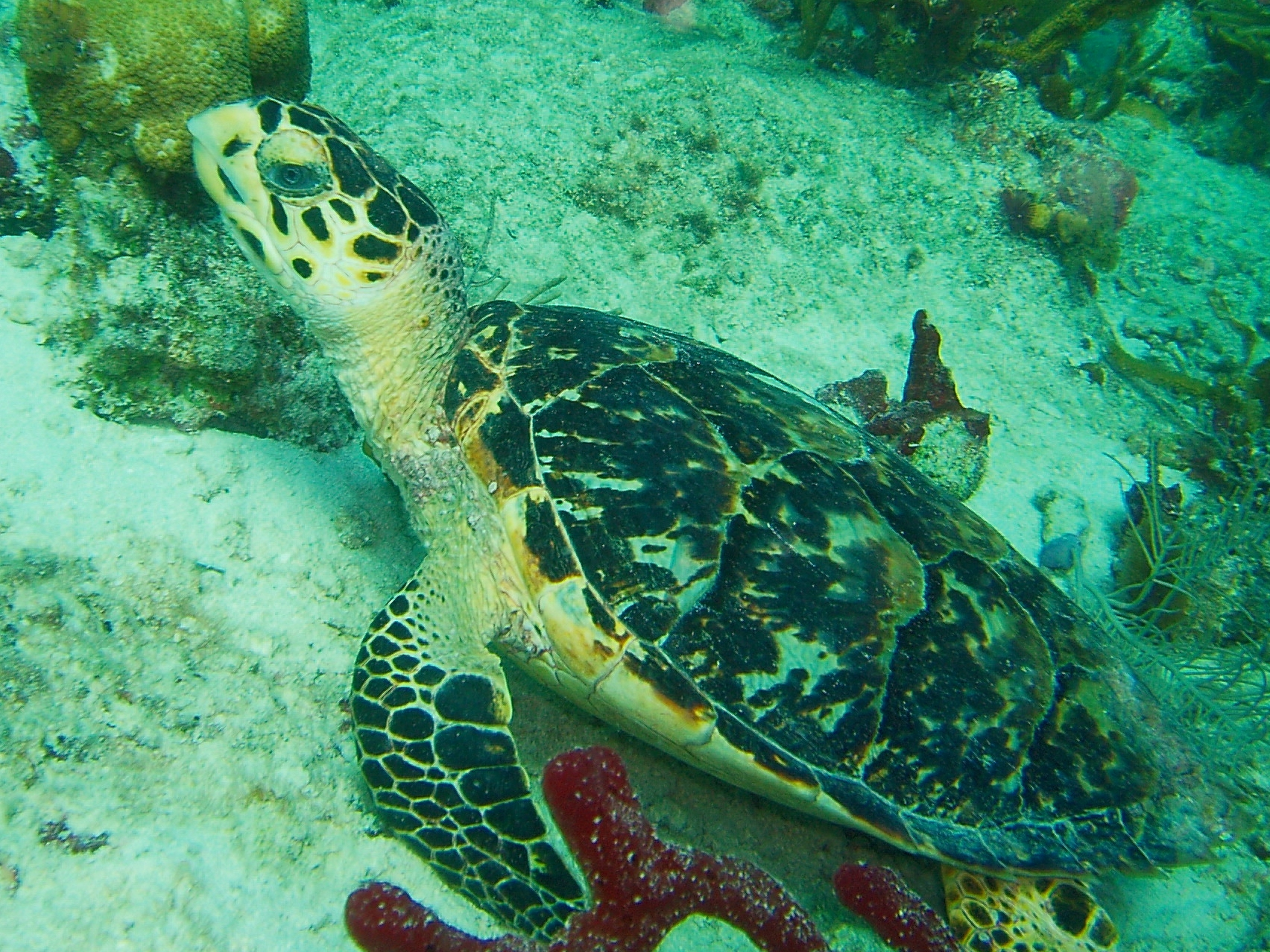
Hawksbill turtle at Coki Beach.

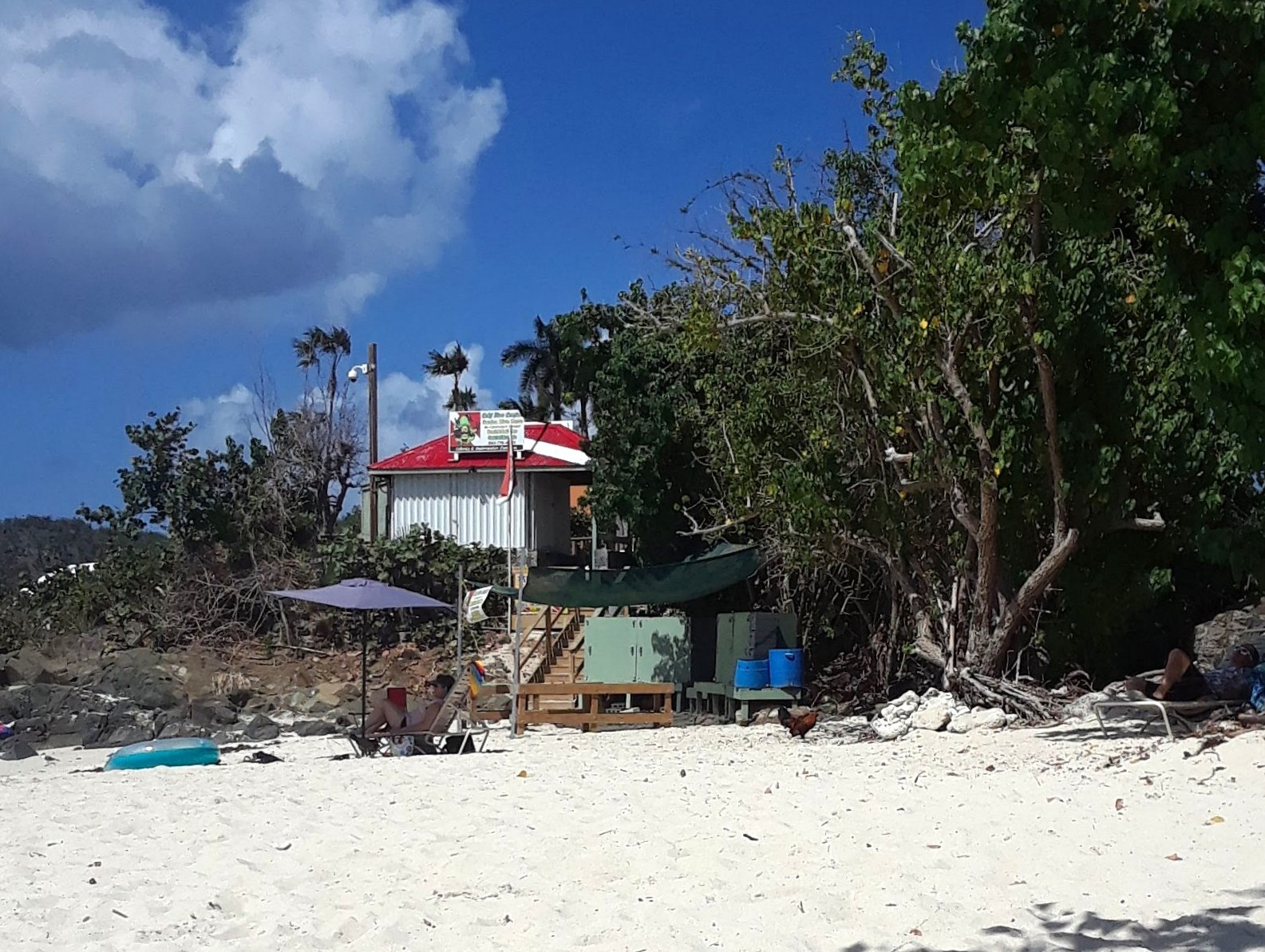
Dive shop at Coki Beach.
