= U.S. Virgin Islands Highway 35 =

Highway in the U.S. Virgin Islands

Highway 35
- Highway 35 highlighted in red

Route information
- Maintained by USVI DPW
- Length: 3.1 mi (5.0 km)

Major junctions
- South end: Hwy 30 in Charlotte Amalie
- Hwy 33 Hwy 40 Hwy 42
- North end: End public maintenance at Magens Bay

Location
- Country: United States
- Territory: United States Virgin Islands

Highway system
- USVI Highways

Highway 35 is a road on St. Thomas, USVI. Beginning in an intersection with Highway 30 overlooking St. Thomas Harbor, the road runs north through eastern Charlotte Amalie, passing by Fort Christian. Once out of the immediate vicinity of the town, Highway 35 begins its twisty journey north to Magens Bay. The road passes Highway 33 and has a brief concurrency with Highway 40 before turning to the northeast to meet Highway 42. Highway 35 finally turns north again and dead-ends at the entrance to Magens Bay Beach.

== Spur routes ==
Highway 35 has no spur routes. The only other St. Thomas route not to be the "parent" of a route is Highway 42.
