= Nadir, U.S. Virgin Islands =

Nadir
- Settlement
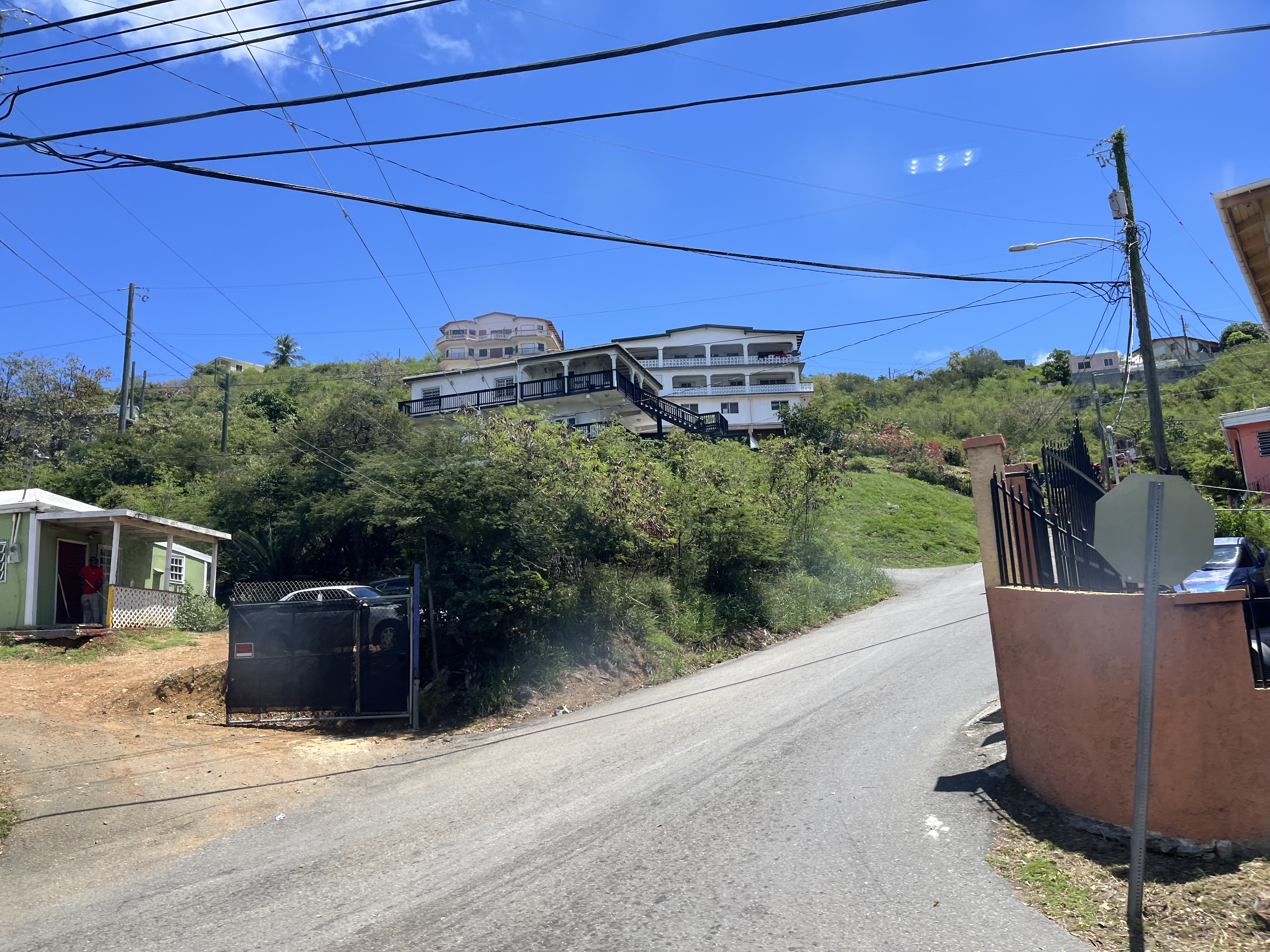

- Location within the U.S. Virgin Islands
- Coordinates: 18°19′20″N 64°52′42″W

Nadir is a settlement on the island of St. Thomas in the United States Virgin Islands.

A "Bridge to Nowhere" is located in Nadir.
