= List of beaches in the U.S. Virgin Islands =

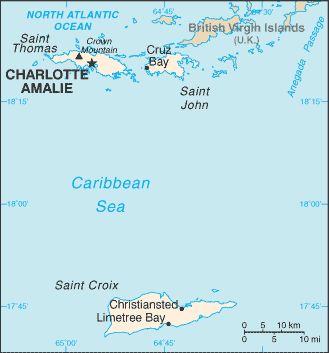
Map of the U.S. Virgin Islands

The following is a list of beaches in the United States Virgin Islands by district/island of the United States Virgin Islands, a territory of the United States. Beaches are on the Caribbean Sea to the south or Atlantic Ocean to the north.

== Saint Croix ==
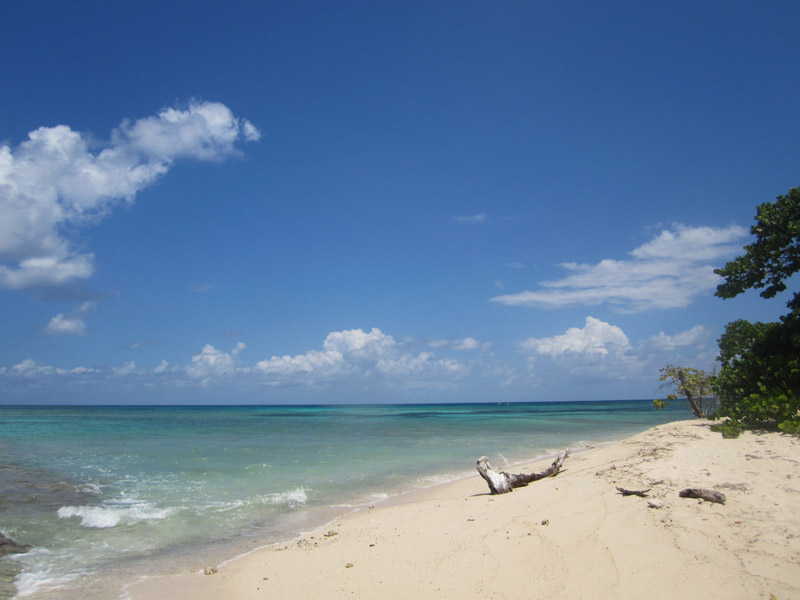
Turtle Beach, Buck Island

Name	Coordinates
Altona Lagoon Beach	17°44′52″N 64°41′30″W
Buccaneer Beach	17°45′21″N 64°41′02″W
Cane Bay Beach	17°46′27″N 64°48′35″W
Carlton Beach	17°40′56″N 64°50′01″W
Cathys Fancy Beach	17°45′27″N 64°43′25″W
Cay Beach	17°44′57″N 64°42′12″W
Chenay Beach	17°45′42″N 64°39′37″W
Coakley Bay	17°45′39″N 64°38′38″W
Columbus Landing	17°46′52″N 64°45′41″W
Cormorant Beach Club	17°46′33″N 64°44′36″W
Cottongarden Bay Beach	17°45′33″N 64°35′04″W
Cramer's Park Beach	17°45′37″N 64°34′53″W
Davis Beach	17°45′45″N 64°49′56″W
Divi (at Divi Carina Bay Resort)	17°45′14″N 64°35′28″W
Dorsch (Sand Castle on the Beach)	17°42′05″N 64°53′09″W
Frederikstead Beach (Fort Frederick Beach), Frederiksted Pier	17°43′01″N 64°53′02″W
Grapetree Beach	17°44′45″N 64°36′08″W
Grassy Point Beach	17°44′03″N 64°36′42″W
The Grotto (Buccaneer resort)
Haypenny Bay (Manchenil)
Issac Bay Beach	17°45′03″N 64°34′18″W
Jack Bay Beach
Judiths Fancy Beach	17°46′30″N 64°44′33″W
LaGrange Beach	17°43′18″N 64°53′07″W
Mermaid Beach (Buccaneer)
Monks Bath Beach	17°45′45″N 64°53′11″W
North Star Beach	17°45′55″N 64°49′29″W
Pelican Cove Beach	17°45′57″N 64°44′07″W
Protestant Cay
Prune Beach	17°45′43″N 64°39′07″W
Rainbow Beach	17°44′04″N 64°53′22″W
Reef Beach	17°45′17″N 64°36′11″W
Saint Croix Country Club Beach	17°43′09″N 64°53′04″W
Salt River Beach (Columbus Landing)	17°46′52″N 64°45′41″W
Sandy Point
Shoy's Beach	17°45′36″N 64°40′51″W
Sprat Hall Beach	17°44′33″N 64°53′32″W
Sugar Beach	17°45′11″N 64°43′00″W
Tamarind Reef Beach	17°45′40″N 64°40′02″W
Turtle Beach/Cove, Buck Island
West Beach	17°47′20″N 64°37′41″W

== Saint John ==
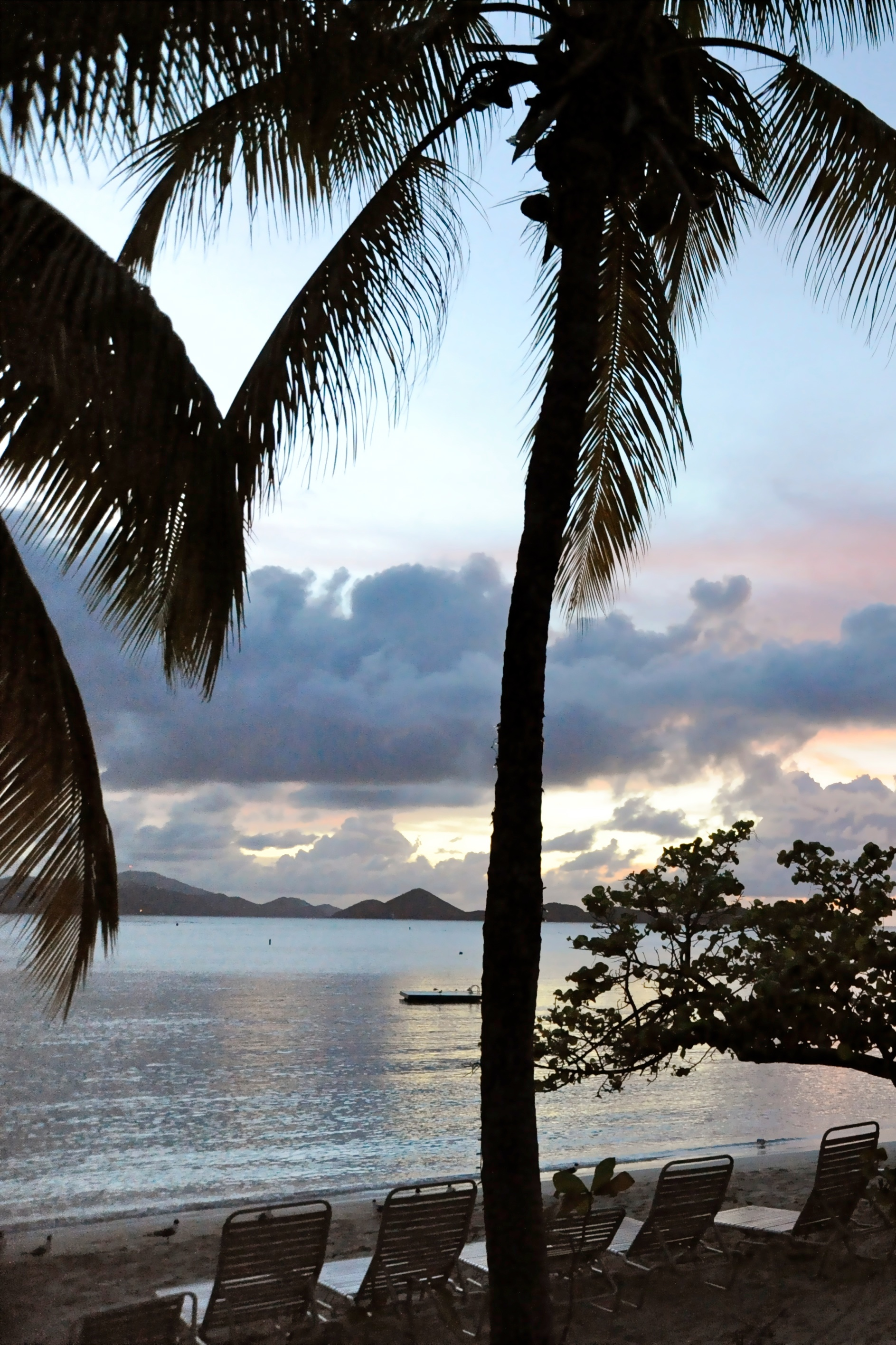
Caneel Beach

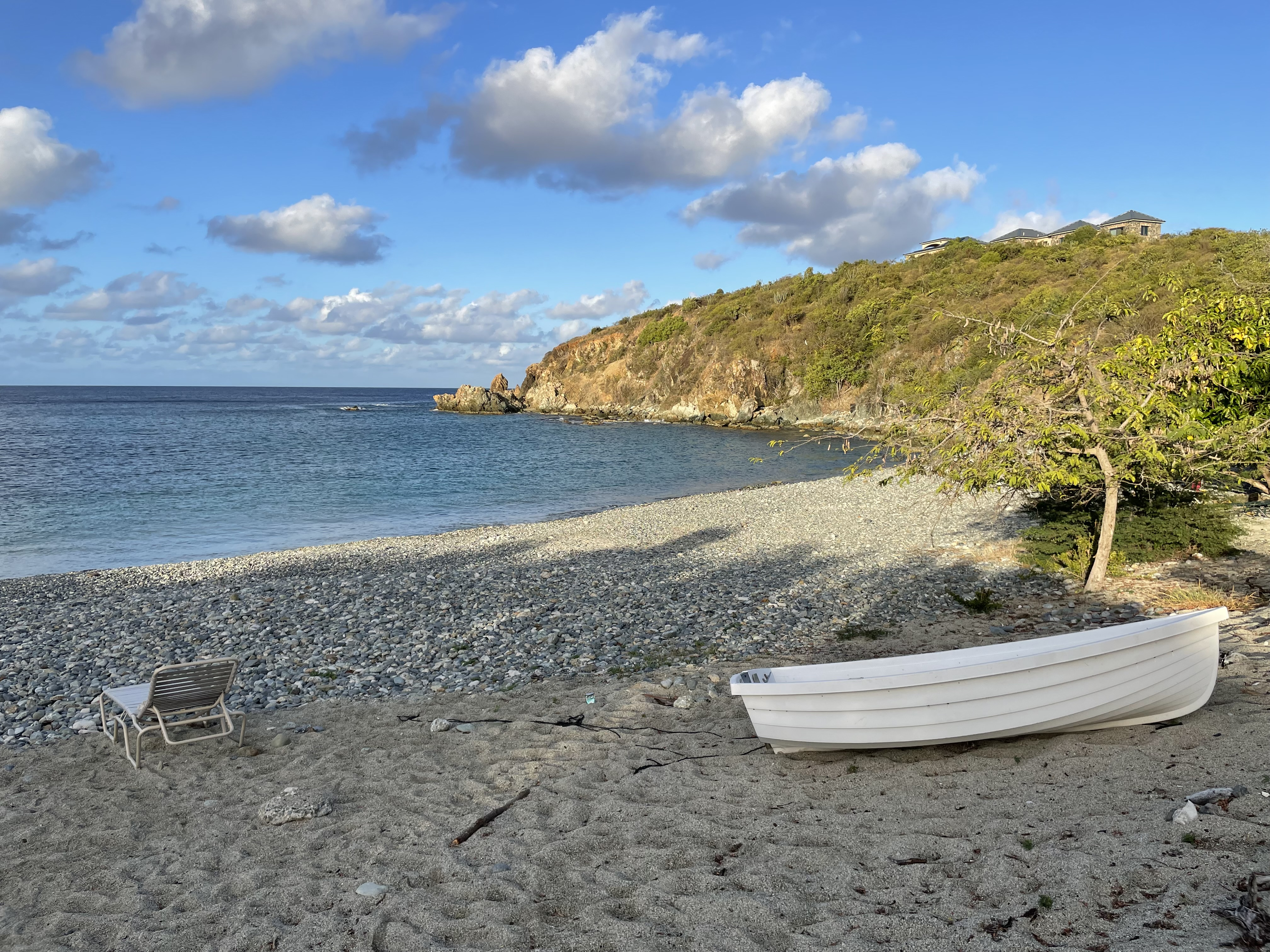
Beach at Kiddel Bay

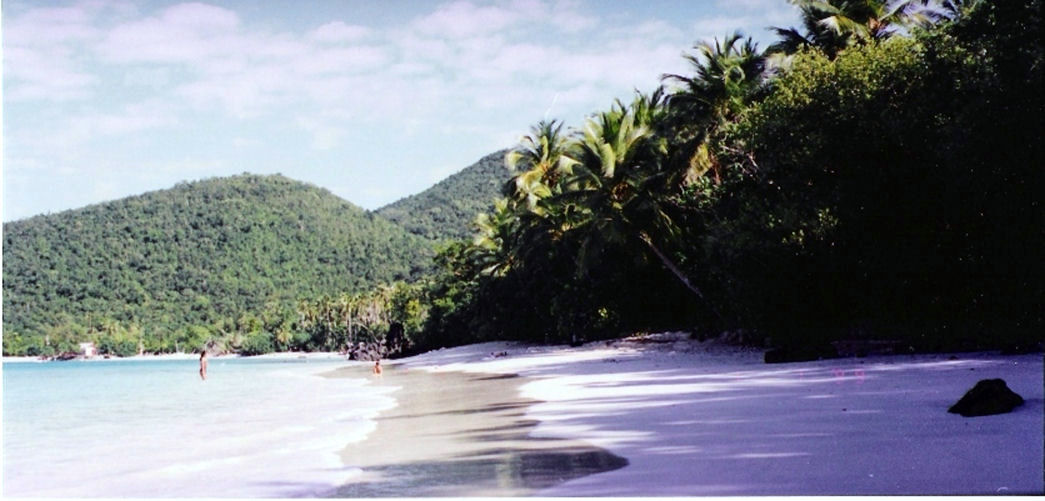
Gibney Beach, aka Oppenheimer Beach

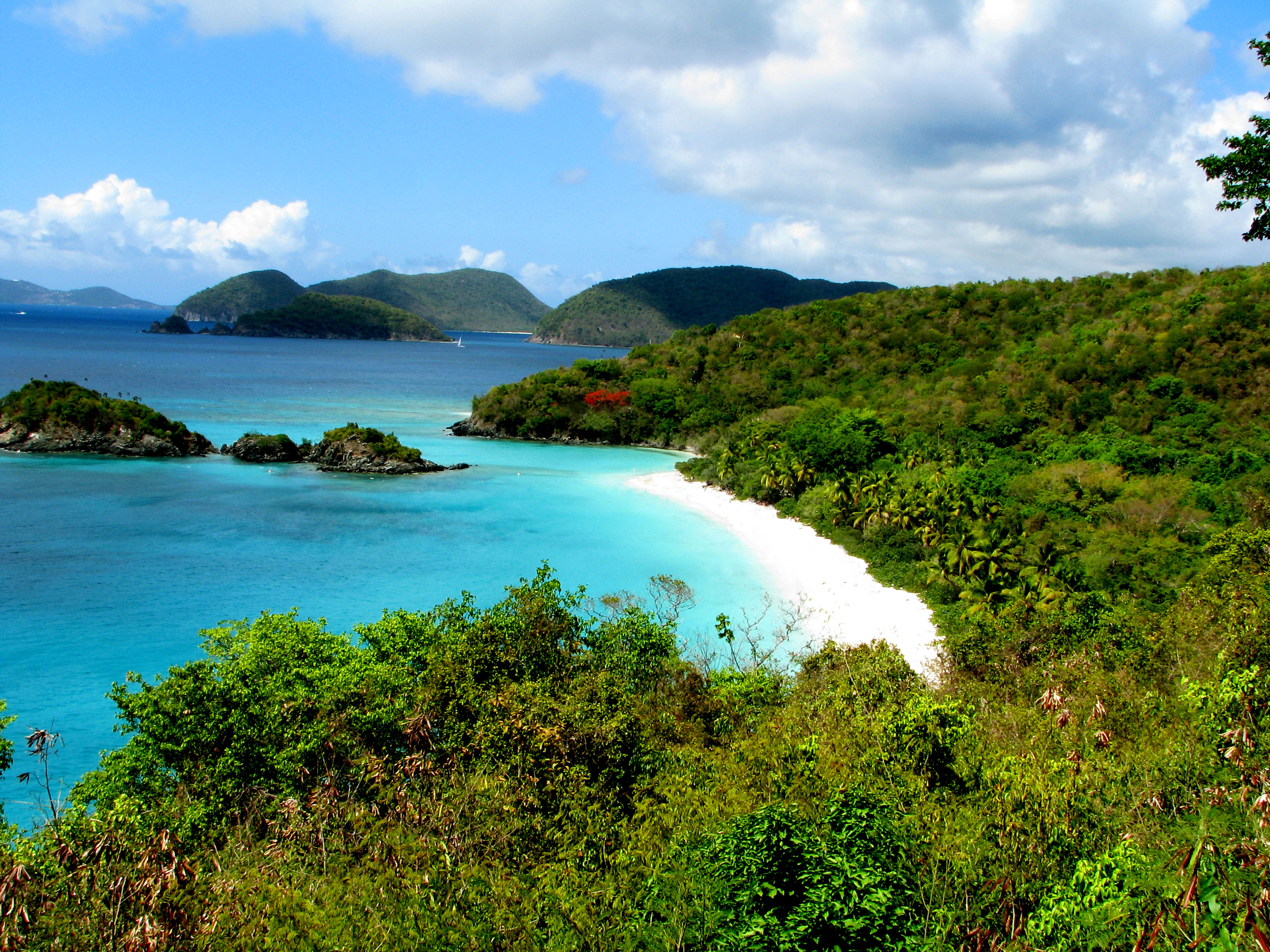
Trunk Bay, St. John

Name	Coordinates
Annaberg Beach	18°21′49″N 64°43′28″W
Blue Cobblestone Beach	18°18′11″N 64°42′10″W
Boatman Point Beach	18°19′01″N 64°46′29″W
Brown Bay Beach	18°21′39″N 64°42′21″W
Caneel Bay Beach	18°20′53″N 64°47′04″W
Cinnamon Bay Beach	18°21′23″N 64°45′08″W,
Cocoloba Beach	18°18′55″N 64°45′35″W
Cruz Bay Beach	18°19′49″N 64°47′50″W
Denis Bay	18°21′10″N 64°46′32″W
Ditleff Beach	18°18′58″N 64°46′00″W
Fish Bay	18°19′10″N 64°45′51″W
Francis Bay Beach	18°21′54″N 64°44′36″W
Gibney Beach (aka Oppenheimer Beach)	18°21′09″N 64°46′36″W
Grootpan Bay	18°18′40″N 64°42′57″W
Hansen Bay Beach	18°20′33″N 64°40′31″W
Hart Bay Beach	18°18′50″N 64°46′51″W
Haulover Beach	18°20′54″N 64°40′45″W
Hawknest Beach	18°20′49″N 64°46′38″W
Honeymoon Bay Beach	18°20′22″N 64°47′39″W
Johns Folly Beach	18°19′01″N 64°42′08″W
Jumbie Bay	18°21′08″N 64°46′27″W
Kiddel Bay	18°18′34″N 64°42′47″W
Lameshur Bay	18°18′58″N 64°43′38″W
Leinster Bay	18°22′03″N 64°43′42″W
Little Cinnamon Bay Beach	18°21′14″N 64°45′20″W
Little Maho Beach	18°21′44″N 64°44′39″W
Little Reef Bay Beach	18°19′18″N 64°45′03″W
Long Bay Beach	18°20′13″N 64°40′27″W
Maho Bay Beach18°21′24″N 64°44′54″W
Peter Bay Beach	18°21′09″N 64°45′39″W
Reef Bay Beach	18°19′01″N 64°45′24″W
Salt Pond Beach	18°18′31″N 64°42′19″W
Salomon Beach	18°20′18″N 64°47′43″W
St. Mary's Creek Beach	18°21′53″N 64°44′16″W
Trunk Bay	18°21′06″N 64°46′13″W
Waterlemon Cay Beach	18°22′01″N 64°43′22″W

== Saint Thomas ==
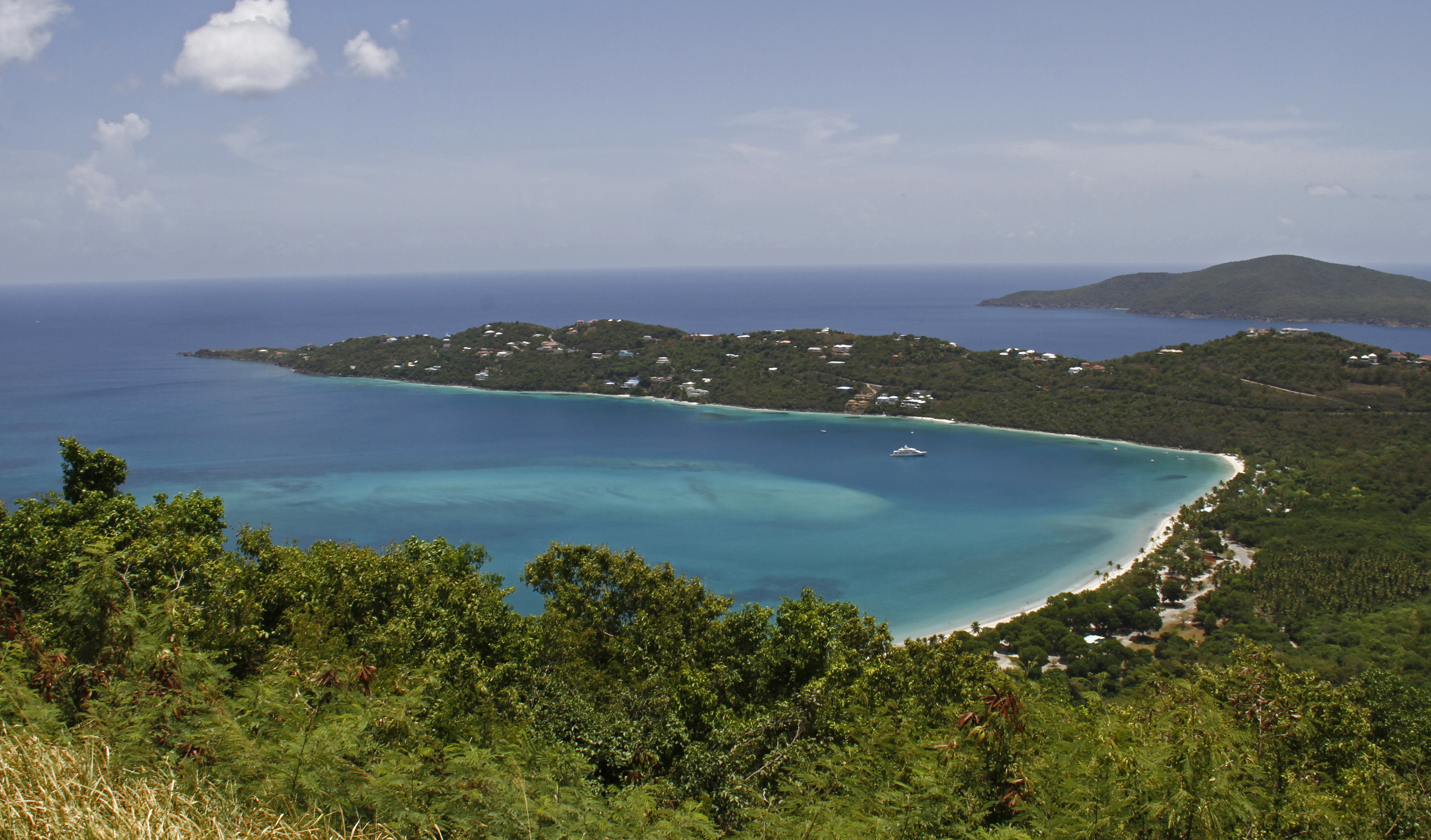
Magens Bay, St. Thomas

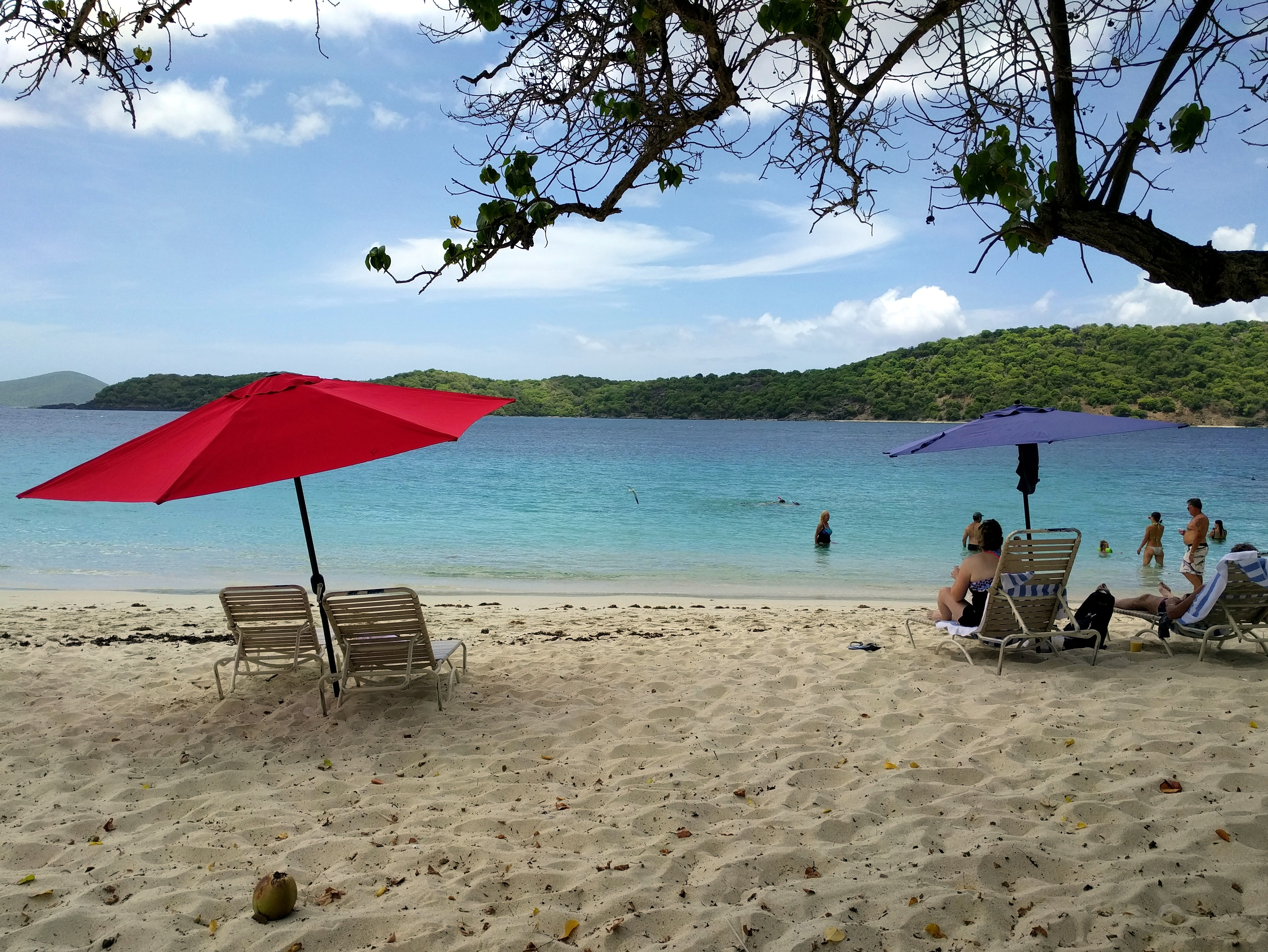
Coki Beach

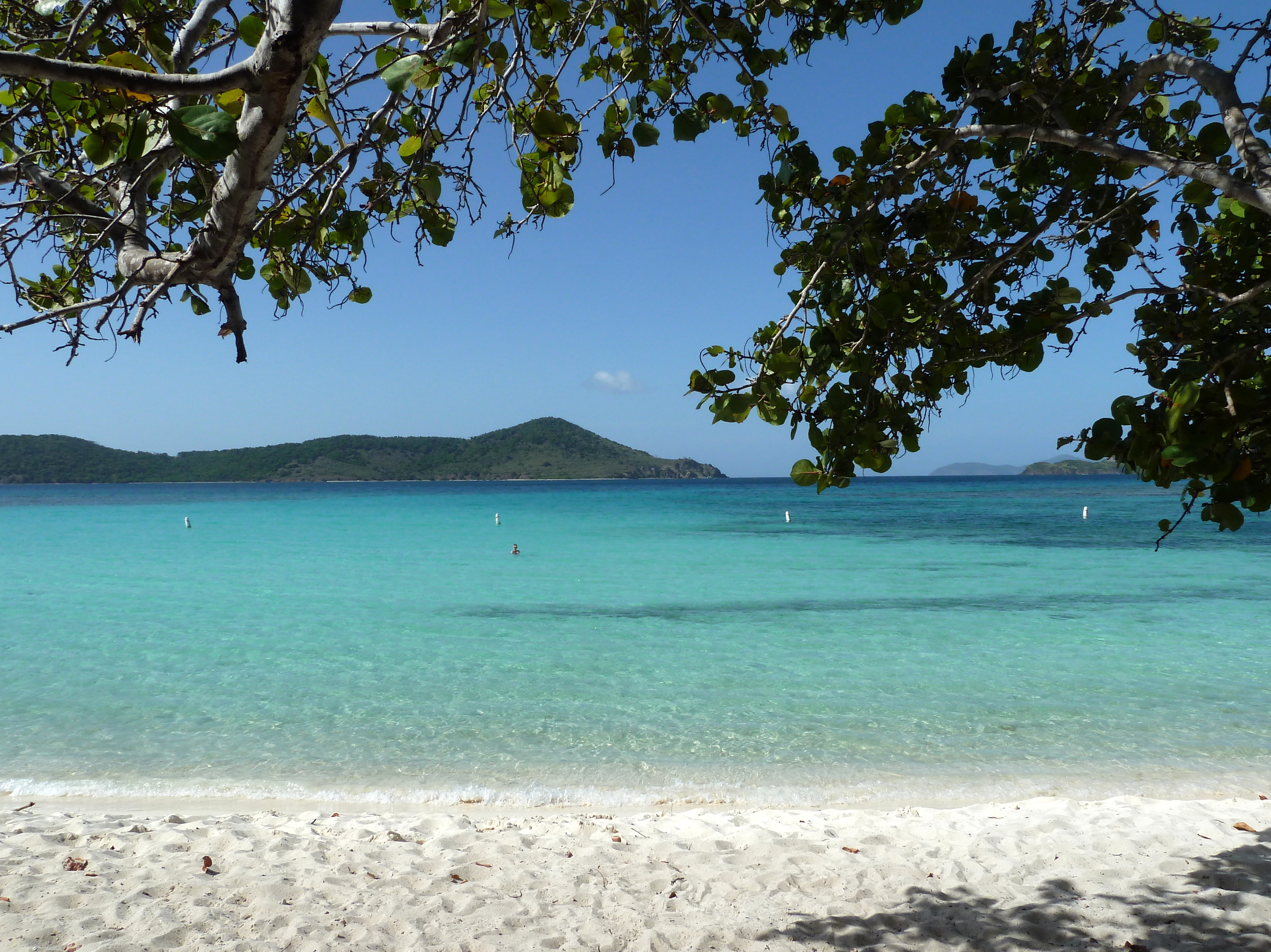
Linquist Beach

There are forty major beaches in Saint Thomas.

Name	Coordinates
Bluebeard Beach	18°19′29″N 64°50′18″W
Bolongo Bay	18°18′42″N 64°53′45″W
Brewers Bay Beach	18°20′37″N 64°58′38″W
Coki Beach (Coki Point)	18°20′59″N 64°51′56″W
Cowpet Bay	18°18′58″N 64°50′31″W
Dorothea Bay	18°22′13″N 64°57′44″W
Great Bay	18°19′17″N 64°50′16″W
Hull Bay Beach	18°22′09″N 64°57′25″W
Limetree Beach	18°19′01″N 64°54′48″W
Lindbergh Beach	18°20′07″N 64°57′52″W
Lindquist Beach (Smith Bay, Cabes Point)	18°20′23″N 64°51′01″W
Magens Bay (Little Magens)	18°22′15″N 64°56′09″W
Mandahl Bay Beach	18°21′39″N 64°53′50″W
Morningstar Beach	18°19′13″N 64°55′11″W
Sapphire Beach	18°20′06″N 64°57′01″W
Secret Harbor Beach	18°19′05″N 64°51′11″W
Sugar Bay (Wyndham)	18°21′54″N 65°00′03″W
Vessup Bay	18°19′31″N 64°51′01″W
Water Bay (aka Pineapple or Renaissance Bay)	18°20′51″N 64°51′50″W

=== Water Island ===
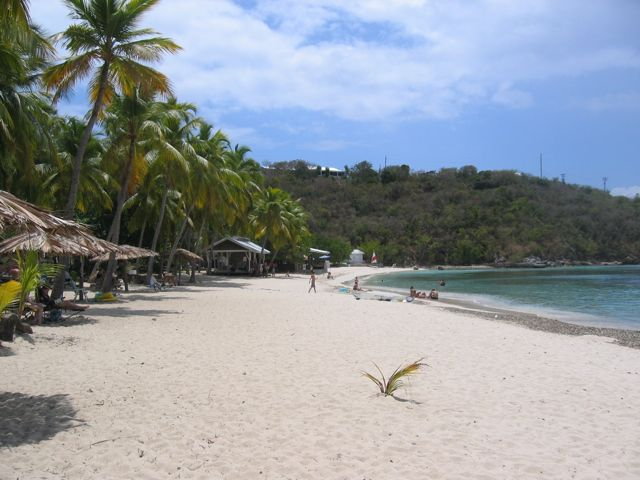
Honeymoon Beach, Water Island

The following beaches are in Water Island, a sub-district of the Saint Thomas District.

Name	Coordinates
Honeymoon Beach	18°18′51″N 64°57′39″W
Limestone Beach	
Revenge Beach	18°18′34″N 64°57′12″W
Sprat Bay
Waterlemon Cay Beach	18°22′01″N 64°43′22″W

== See also ==
- List of beaches
