= Cinnamon Bay Plantation =

- U.S. National Register of Historic Places
- U.S. Historic district
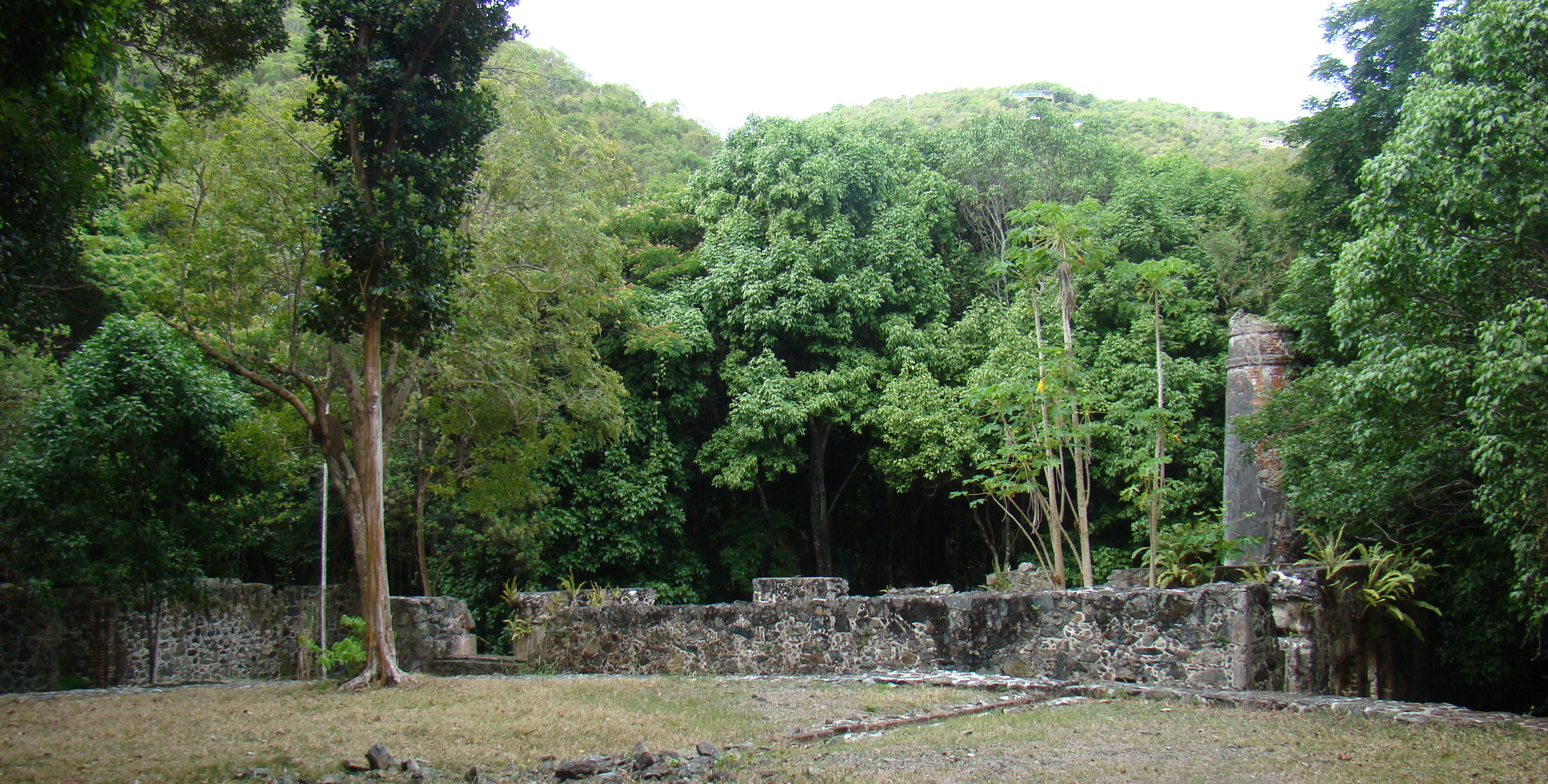
- Cinnamon Bay Plantation

- Location within the U.S. Virgin Islands
- Nearest city: Cruz Bay, Virgin Islands
- Coordinates: 18°21′14″N 64°45′18″W
- Area: 13 acres (5.3 ha)
- MPS: Virgin Islands National Park MRA (AD)
- NRHP reference No.: 78000269
- Added to NRHP: July 11, 1978

Cinnamon Bay Plantation is an approximately 300-acre (1.2 km^{2}) property situated on the north central coast of Saint John in the United States Virgin Islands adjacent to Cinnamon Bay. The land, part of Virgin Islands National Park, was added to the United States National Register of Historic Places on July 11, 1978. Archaeological excavations of the land document ceremonial activity of the Taínos, as well as historic remains of plantation ruins.

== History ==
=== Early inhabitants ===
Archaeological evidence shows that the first inhabitants of the Virgin Islands were Ortoiroid people, who began their migration into the Antilles from the Orinoco River basin in South America about 2000 BC. The historic Arawak people migrated to the area over a period of many centuries and engaged in the first agriculture on the land. Archaeological excavations confirm a Classic Taíno culture at Cinnamon Bay.

=== Plantation era ===
Starting in the 1680s, prior to any formal colonization, the land along the shoreline of the north central coast of Saint John was occupied for decades by settlers of diverse nationalities. The property was used for maritime activities and cotton production. The Danish claimed Saint John on March 25, 1718, and the area along the north central coast from Caneel Bay to Cinnamon Bay was occupied by nine private land owners. The Danish established large sugarcane plantations worked by slaves brought from Africa.

Daniel Jansen and his wife Adriana Delicat were the first land owners to acquire a formal Danish deed for property at Cinnamon Bay. Approximate to Jenson's purchase in 1718, a coastal parcel of land was purchased by William Gandy in 1722 and was later bought by Peter Durloo in 1728. Durloo was the husband of Daniel Jansen's daughter, Elizabeth. Durloo's newly acquired coastal land abutted Jensen's property to the north. In 1719, Pieter de Buyck purchased property along the north central coast of the island, east of the Gandy-Durloo land. After De Buyck's death in 1728, the land became the property of Abraham Beaudewyn. The 1936 tax records show that Jasper Jansen, Daniel and Adriana Jansen's eldest son, owned the De Buyck-Beaudewyn land. Despite the short tenure of De Buyck, this locale still carries his name, Peter Bay. These three parcels of land – the Jansen, Gandy-Durloo, and De Buyck-Beaudewyn properties – became the consolidated estate later known as Cinnamon Bay Plantation.

List of new owners of the consolidated property:

- 18th century
  - 1739 Adriana Jansen and Jasper Jansen
  - 1755 John Hobby (married Jasper Jansen's widow)
  - 1760 Commandant Harrien Felchenhauer
  - 1765 Madam Adriana Bödker
  - 1770 Mathias Bowe
  - 1775 Wood and Guyle for Patrik Mc Donnel
  - 1776 Michael Shoy
  - 1780 Michael Shoy's heirs
  - 1784 Lachlan Mc Lachlan ( married to Mary Shoy)
  - 1785 Johannes Dam (married to Mary Shoy)
  - 1790 Johannes Dam's heirs
  - 1795 Hans D. Cronenberg (married to Mary Shoy)
- 19th century
  - 1805 Mary Cronenberg
  - 1823 Mary Lindberg
  - 1834 N. S. Hjardemaal and Andersen
  - 1836 N. S. Hjardemaal
  - 1845 N. S. Hjardemaal and C. A Woldsen
  - 1847 Clement Skelton, Thomas Ivinson, and William Dawson
  - 1857 R. F. Barner
  - 1858 Abraham Chalwell Hill
  - 1863 John William Weinmar
  - 1867 Carl Alexander Lindqvist
  - 1884 Margaret Lindqvist
  - 1894 John Emanuel Lindqvist, Caroline Amelia Lindqvist, Marie Eliza Lindqvist, and Georgianne Adriane Lindqvist
- 20th century
  - 1903 Danish West Indies Plantation Company

=== 1733 slave insurrection ===
During the 1733 slave insurrection on St. John, slaves loyal to the Jensen family held off the rebel slaves long enough for the Jansen's to escape, but they could not prevent "the property's dwelling house, storage building, and boiling house from being looted and burned, nor could they prevent the Jansen cane fields from being set ablaze."

=== 20th-century history ===
In 1913, Cinnamon Bay was bought by a Danish company, and the land was used for breeding and raising of cattle.

In 1955, Cinnamon Bay was sold to Jackson Hole Preserve, Incorporated and in 1956 donated to Virgin Islands National Park.

== Sugar plantation ==
The 1805 tax rolls show that Cinnamon Bay plantation had 105 acres (0.42 km^{2}) planted in sugarcane, 48 acres (190,000 m^{2}) in provision crops, and 147 acres (0.59 km^{2}) unused or in bush.

== Historic district ==
The Cinnamon Bay Plantation historic district was a collection of former plantation buildings clustered around the North Short Road when it was added to the historic register in 1978. These included a factory building, plantation house, servants quarters, and other buildings commonly associated with a sugar plantation. Two small cemeteries were also present.

The remains of the factory cannot be dated precisely, though they are of a type common to the early and mid 1700s. The plantation itself was known to be active prior to the 1733 slave rebellion. Middens in the area provide evidence of pre-Columbian occupation over an extensive period.

== Virgin Islands National Park ==
The land was donated to the United States National Park Service in 1956 by Laurance Rockefeller. Virgin Islands National Park was then established here.

== See also ==
- Annaberg Historic District
- Reef Bay Sugar Factory Historic District
- Sugar production in the Danish West Indies
- Sugar plantations in the Caribbean
- Sugar plantations in the West Indies
