= Whistling Cay, United States Virgin Islands =

Islet in the United States Virgin Islands

Whistling Cay
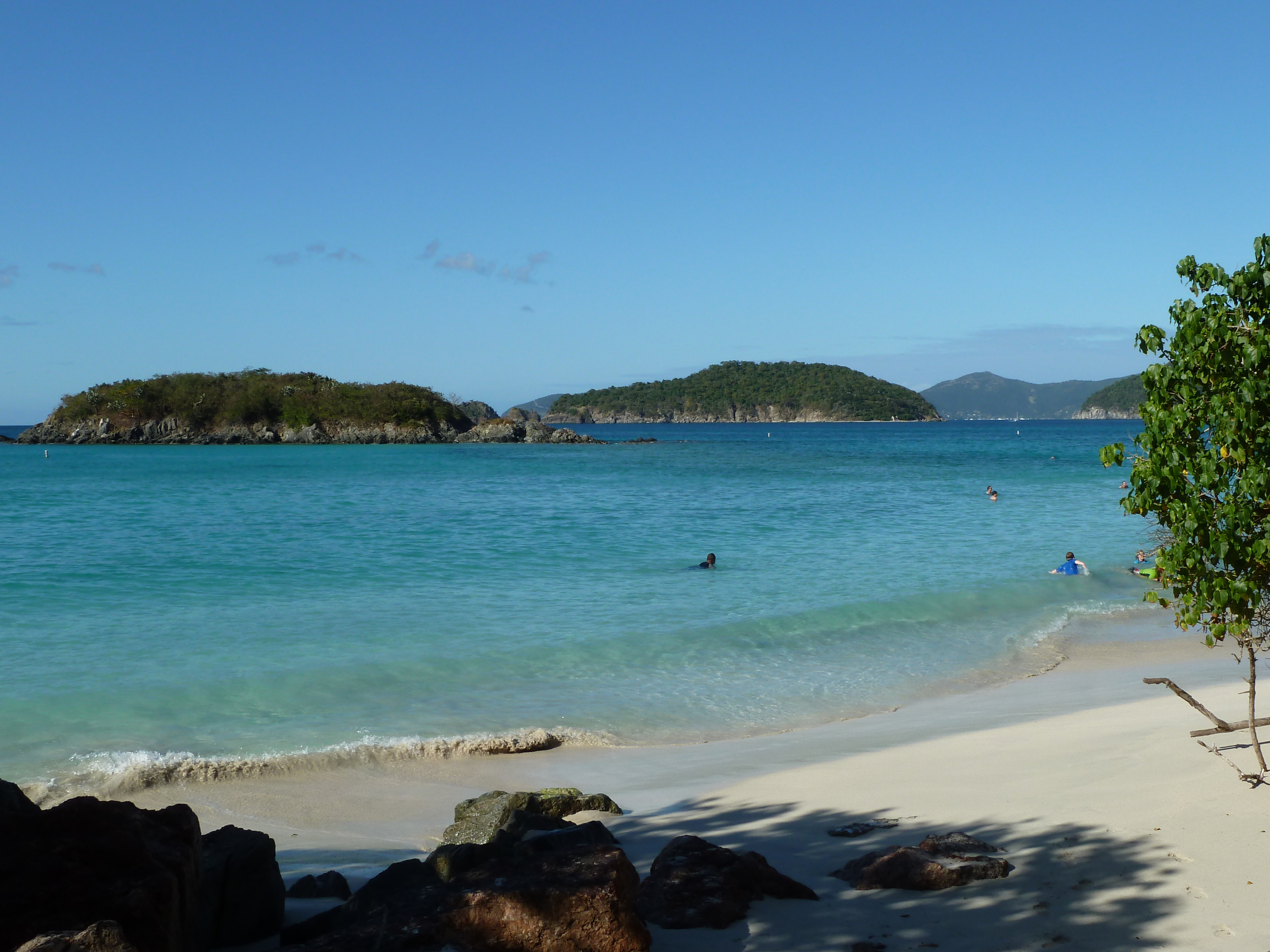
- Cinnamon Cay (left) and Whistling Cay (right), as seen from Cinnamon Bay, 2011.

- Location in the Caribbean Whistling Cay, United States Virgin Islands (the Caribbean)

Geography
- Location: Caribbean Sea
- Coordinates: 18.370°N 64.757°W

Administration
- United States; United States Virgin Islands
- Federal Department: U.S. Department of the Interior
- Federal Agency: U.S. Fish and Wildlife Service
- Capital city: Washington, D.C.
- Largest settlement: New York City
- President: Donald Trump

Whistling Cay is a 19-acre (7.7 ha) islet, situated 300 yards (270 m) west of Mary Point on Saint John in the United States Virgin Islands. It is covered with trees and high cliffs in the north, where it reaches a 130-foot (40 m) elevation. A gravel beach is located on the southeast side of the island. It is separated from Saint John by the Fungi Passage, which has a depth of 21 feet (6.4 m).

Whistling Cay can be reached by boat or kayak from Cinnamon Bay, Maho Bay, or Francis Bay and it is a popular destination for scuba diving and snorkeling. During the 19th century, customs officials stationed on the islet would stop and inspect boats plying the passage between the British Virgin Islands and the then Danish Virgin Islands. It is located within the Virgin Islands National Park.
