= Cinnamon Cay =

Cay in the United States Virgin Islands

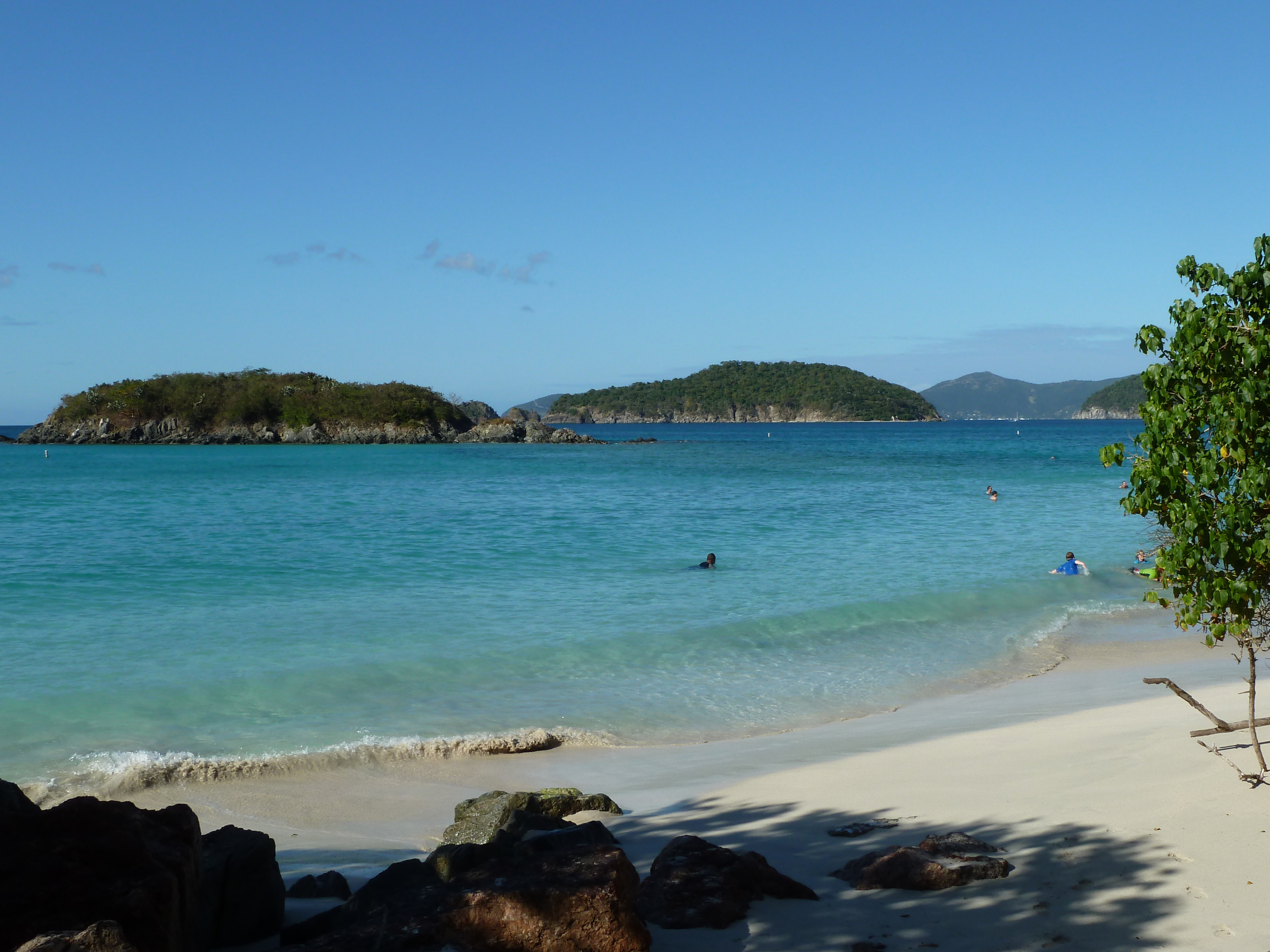
- Cinnamon Cay (left) and Whistling Cay (right), as seen from Cinnamon Bay, 2011.

- Location in the Caribbean Cinnamon Cay (the Caribbean)

Geography
- Location: Caribbean Sea
- Coordinates: 18°21′23″N 64°45′23″W

Administration
- United States; United States Virgin Islands
- Federal Department: U.S. Department of the Interior
- Federal Agency: U.S. Fish and Wildlife Service
- Capital city: Washington, D.C.
- Largest settlement: New York City
- President: Donald John Trump

Cinnamon Cay is a cay in the United States Virgin Islands, situated approximately 0.7 miles east of Trunk Cay in the Cinnamon Bay, and 100 yards from the shore at Cinnamon Bay Beach on Saint John island. It has a height of 32 feet. The islet is uninhabited, but regularly visited by scuba-divers, snorkelers and kayakers. Cinnamon Bay Watersports offers kayaks and snorkeling equipment for travelers to the cay. Cinnamon Cay is mostly covered with grass and cactus, and is located within the Virgin Islands National Park.

== See also ==
- Islands of the United States Virgin Islands
