= Reef Bay Trail petroglyphs =

- Petroglyph Site
- U.S. National Register of Historic Places
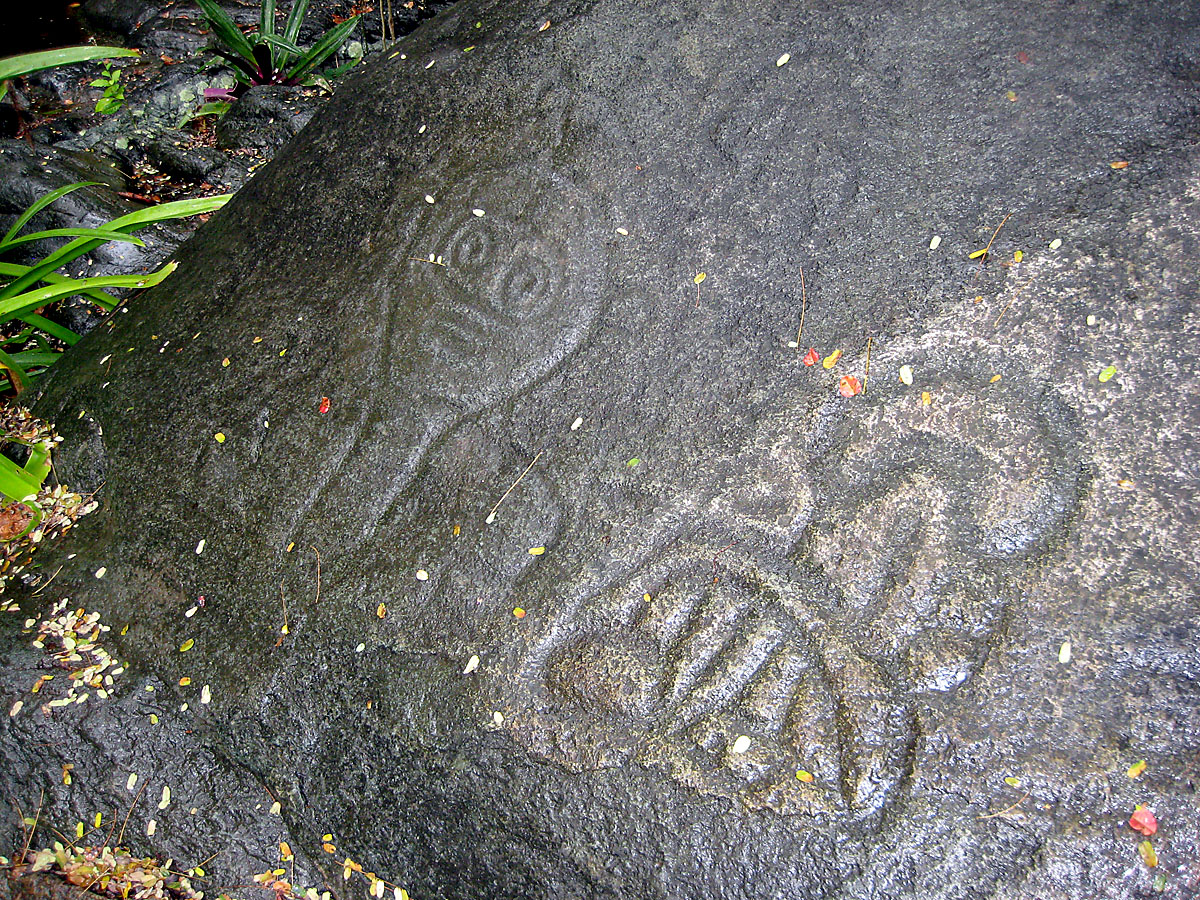
- Some of the petroglyphs
- Location: Address restricted
- Nearest city: Reef Bay, United States Virgin Islands
- Area: less than one acre
- NRHP reference No.: 82001716
- Added to NRHP: July 7, 1982

The Reef Bay Trail petroglyphs are a group of Taíno petroglyph carvings found in the Virgin Islands National Park on the island of St. John, United States Virgin Islands. They are located in a part of the park called the Reef Bay Trail.

Some of the carvings are located above a reflection pool of water and were thought to be the symbols for "water". There is no exact way to confirm they are authentic Taíno carvings but the most popular theory is that they are from pre-columbian inhabitants.

A new petroglyph was found in 2011 after several people from an organization called "Friends of the Park" went on a search. This is because an old park photograph showed there was a petroglyph unaccounted for. The newest found symbol is thought to be thousands of years old and artistically similar to the pottery of the Saladoid culture.

The petroglyph site was listed under the name Petroglyph Site in the National Register of Historic Places on July 7, 1982.

== See also ==
- National Register of Historic Places listings in the United States Virgin Islands
- Virgin Islands National Park
- Reef Bay Sugar Factory Historic District
