= Cinnamon Bay =

Body of water and beach in the US Virgin Islands

Coordinates: 18°21′17″N 64°45′30″W

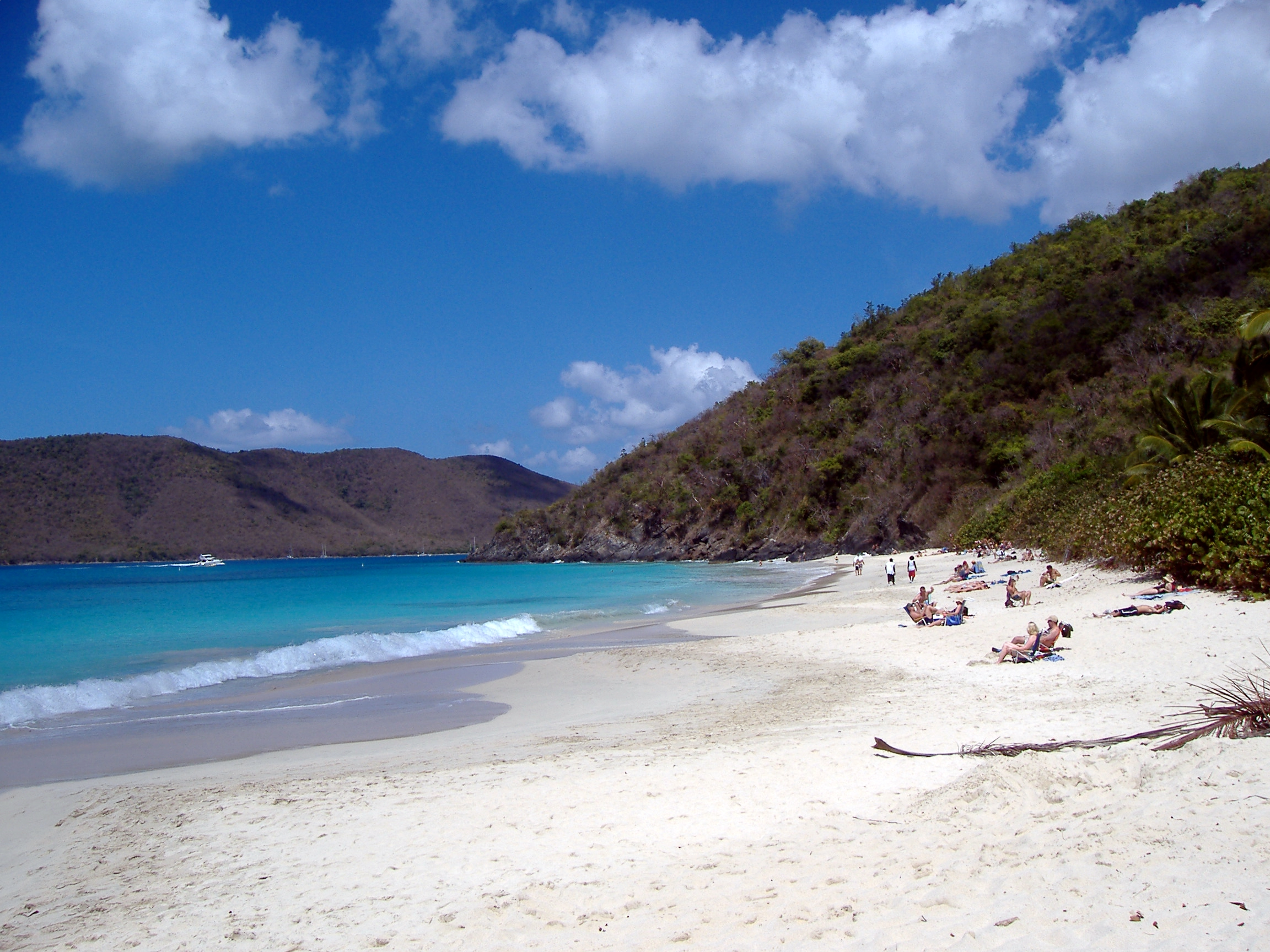

Cinnamon Bay is a body of water and a beach on St. John island, within Virgin Islands National Park, in the United States Virgin Islands.

== Geography ==
The bay is just east of Trunk Bay, and is about a mile west of Maho Bay beach. The shallow, clear water and the short distance to Cinnamon Cay (a small, low-elevation, sandy island) make Cinnamon Bay excellent for snorkeling. It is adjacent to the historic colonial Danish Cinnamon Bay Plantation, an open-air museum of the sugar production in the Danish West Indies.

== Recreation ==
Camping in Virgin Islands National Park is permitted only at Cinnamon Bay Resort and Campground — no back-country or beach camping is allowed by the National Park Service. Cinnamon Bay Resort and Campground features bare sites, tent-covered platforms, sustainable eco-tents and cottages available, along with a restaurant (RainTree Café) and a small beach shop. Park Service programs are offered in a small amphitheatre. In addition, a wide range of weekly activities are available at the campground, such as snorkeling movies, and cultural presentations. Cinnamon Bay Water Sports rents snorkeling equipment, sea kayaks, sailboards and small sailboats, and provides lessons as well. Volunteers are given the opportunity to participate in an archaeological dig on a pre-Columbian Taino ceremonial site.

Hiking opportunities are available on the Cinnamon Bay Nature Trail and the similarly named Cinnamon Bay Trail. Not only wildlife, but also ruins left by the Danish settlers can be seen along the trails, including the ruins of the original Cinnamon Bay sugar mill directly across the road from the campground entrance. Transportation to and from the port city of Cruz Bay is available by safari taxi for $7 per person.

== See also ==
- Cinnamon Bay Plantation
- Virgin Islands National Park topics
- St. John island, United States Virgin Islands
