= Haypenny Bay =

Beach in the US Virgin Islands

Coordinates: 17°42′19″N 64°41′52″W

Haypenny Bay is nearly a mile long stretch of beach located directly south of Christiansted in Company Quarter on the southeastern shore of St Croix United States Virgin Islands. Haypenny Bay is also referred to as Ha'Penny Beach and Halfpenny Beach. The long stretch of empty beach serves not only as shoreline for swimmers and sunbathers but also as a racetrack for beach relays. This lack of commercialization aids in local environmental education and awareness efforts.

The only commercial establishments close to Haypenny Bay include: the Haypenny Beach Club, a private formal dining club is located on the bay waterfront; bed and breakfast Haypenny Rest located in the hills overlooking the beach; and Catherine's Rest Store, a convenience store providing the only pit stop for visitors to the beach.

Haypenny Bay is one of 43 beaches located in the US Virgin Islands and monitored by the Territory.
