= Hull Bay, U.S. Virgin Islands =

Coordinates: 18.369496°N 64.951786°W

Hull Bay is a beach on the island Saint Thomas, United States Virgin Islands, located in the Caribbean.

Hull Bay is a quiet beach on the Northside of Saint Thomas, located west of Magens Bay. It is frequented by locals and dogs. Many small fishing boats are anchored at the beach. Although usually calm, on rough days, Hull Bay is a popular surfing beach. The beach has a bar and restaurant, bathrooms, and a dive center.

== Gallery ==
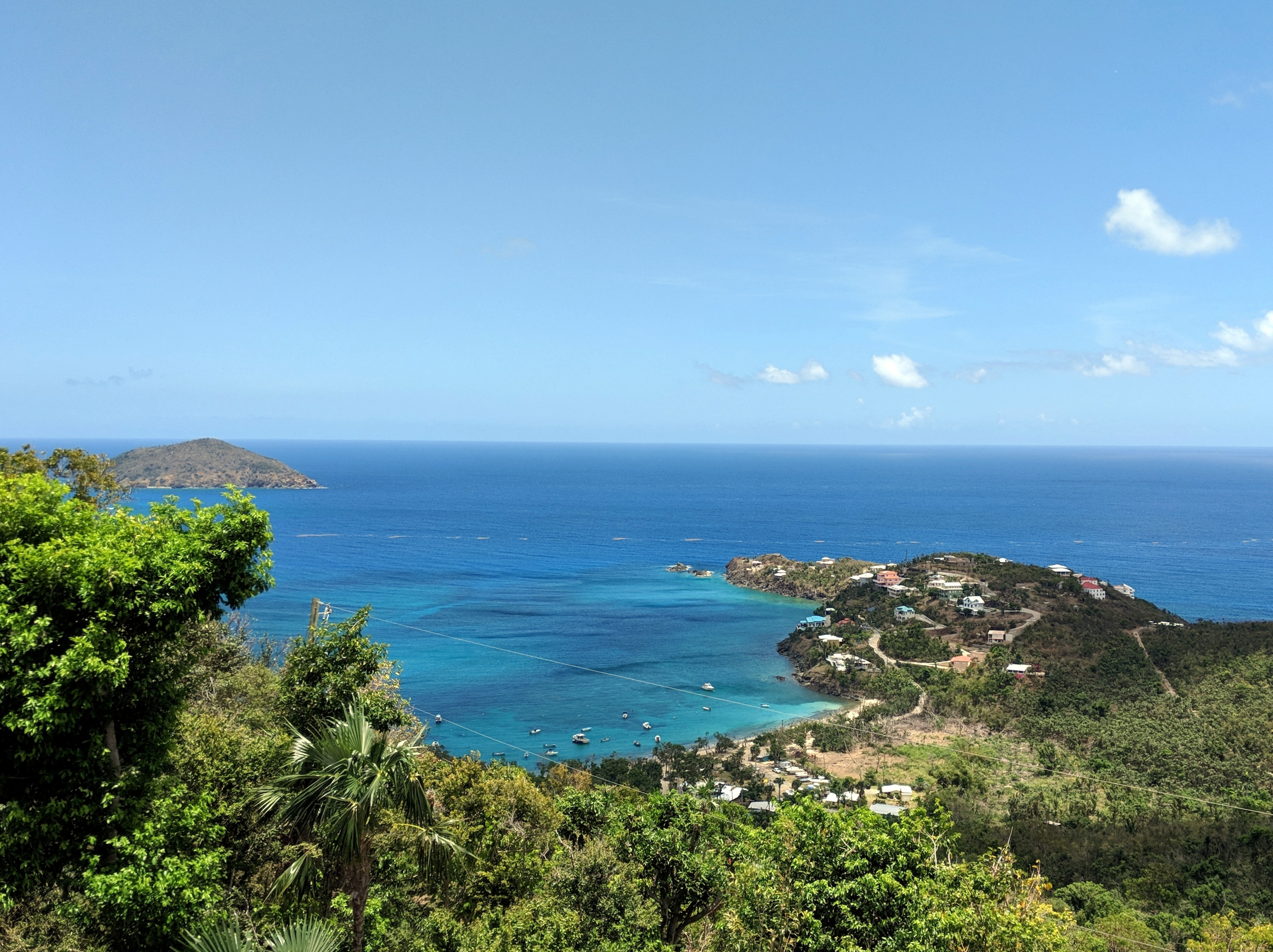
Hull Bay, as seen from a hill above

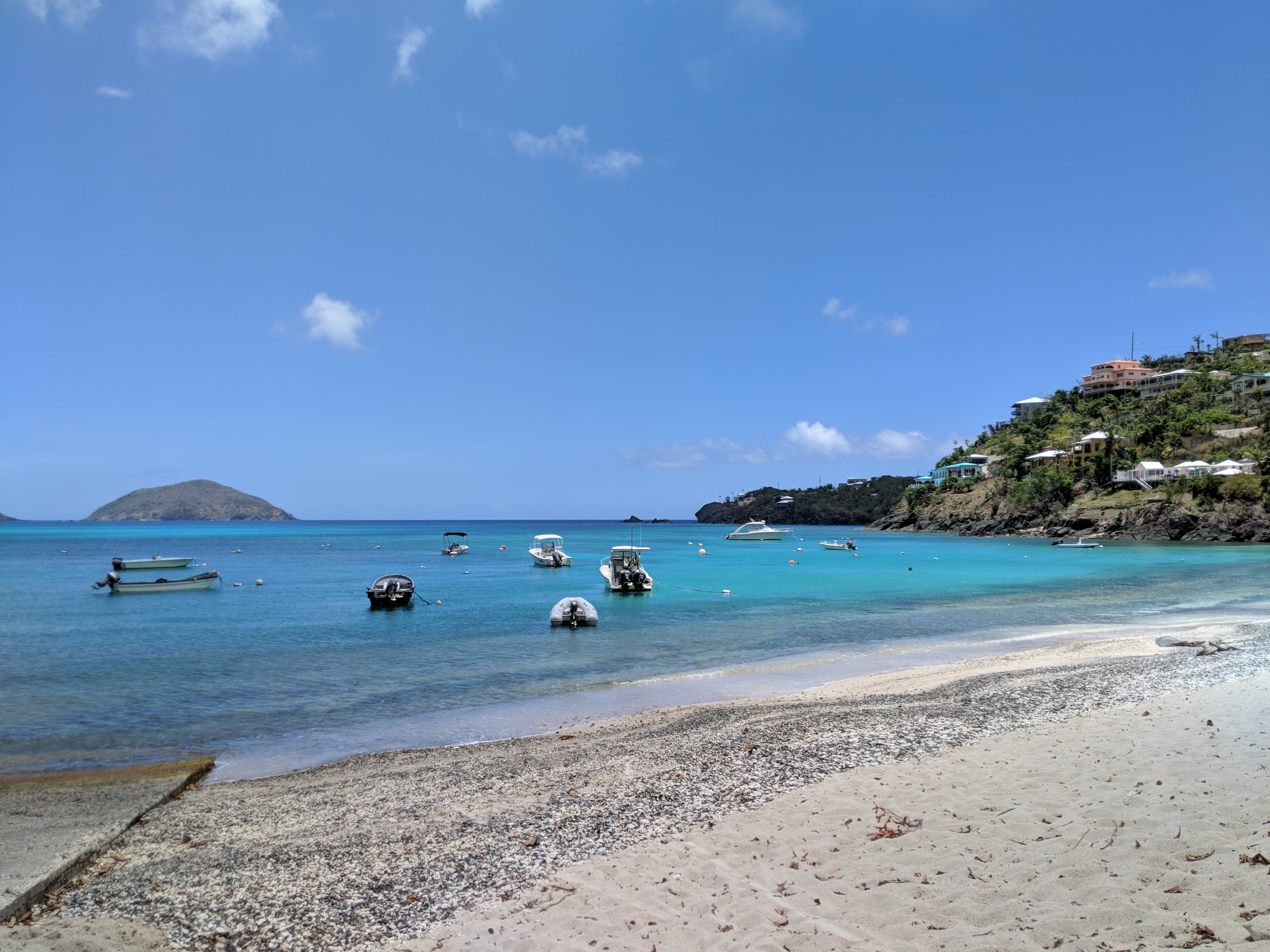
Hull Bay, as seen from the boat launch
