= Bolongo, U.S. Virgin Islands =

American settlement

Coordinates: 18°19′03″N 64°53′54″W

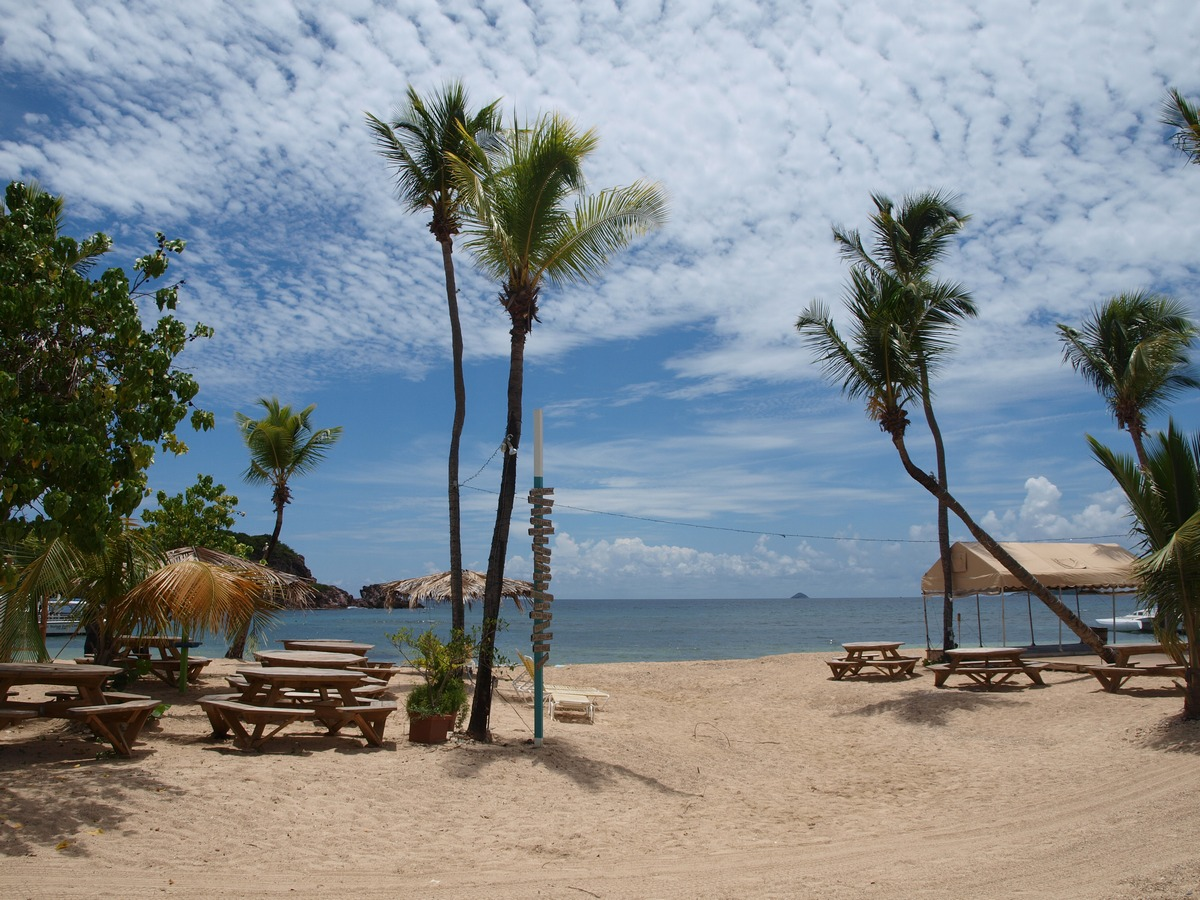
Bolongo Bay

Bolongo is a settlement on the island of Saint Thomas in the United States Virgin Islands.

Bolongo is also a dialect of the Mongo, a Bantu language from Africa. Bantu-speaking people were taken to the new world during the slave trade, and is a large part of Afro-Brazilian History. With language groups often used as a source of identity, it is possible that this settlement may have found its name from Bolongo-speaking Bantu slaves that may have been brought to Saint Thomas during the new world slave trade, although this possibility has not yet been thoroughly researched.

Estate Bolongo is the location of Bolongo Bay Beach Resort, an all-inclusive beach resort that sits along the sandy 1,000-foot beach inside Bolongo Bay. Over 100 native coconut trees up to forty years old still populate the sandy bay, despite losses from major Hurricanes in 1989, 1995 and 2017.

Bolongo Bay is also home to Iggies Beach Bar, one of the Caribbean's original and top-rated beach bars.
