= Jackson Hole Preserve =

US non-profit conservation organization

Jackson Hole Preserve, Incorporated
- Founded: 1940
- Founders: Laurance Rockefeller
- Type: Non-profit conservation organization
- Purpose: Conservation ethic applied to natural areas. Protecting land for Grand Teton National Park; donating land for Virgin Islands National Park

Jackson Hole Preserve, Incorporated is non-profit conservation organization whose primary mission is the conservation ethic applied to natural areas.

== History ==
The Jackson Hole Preserve organization was founded in 1940 by Laurance Rockefeller. In 1943 it protected land, now in Grand Teton National Park, as a nature preserve originally known as the Jackson Hole Preserve and later the Jackson Hole Wildlife Park.

Laurance Rockefeller also purchased and donated 5,000 acres (20 km^{2}) of land on Saint John island in the United States Virgin Islands, to the U.S. National Park Service to create Virgin Islands National Park.

== See also ==
- Grand Teton National Park
- New York State Office of Parks, Recreation and Historic Preservation
- Virgin Islands National Park
