= Trunk Bay =

Body of water in the U.S. Virgin Islands

Coordinates: 18°21′09″N 64°46′11″W

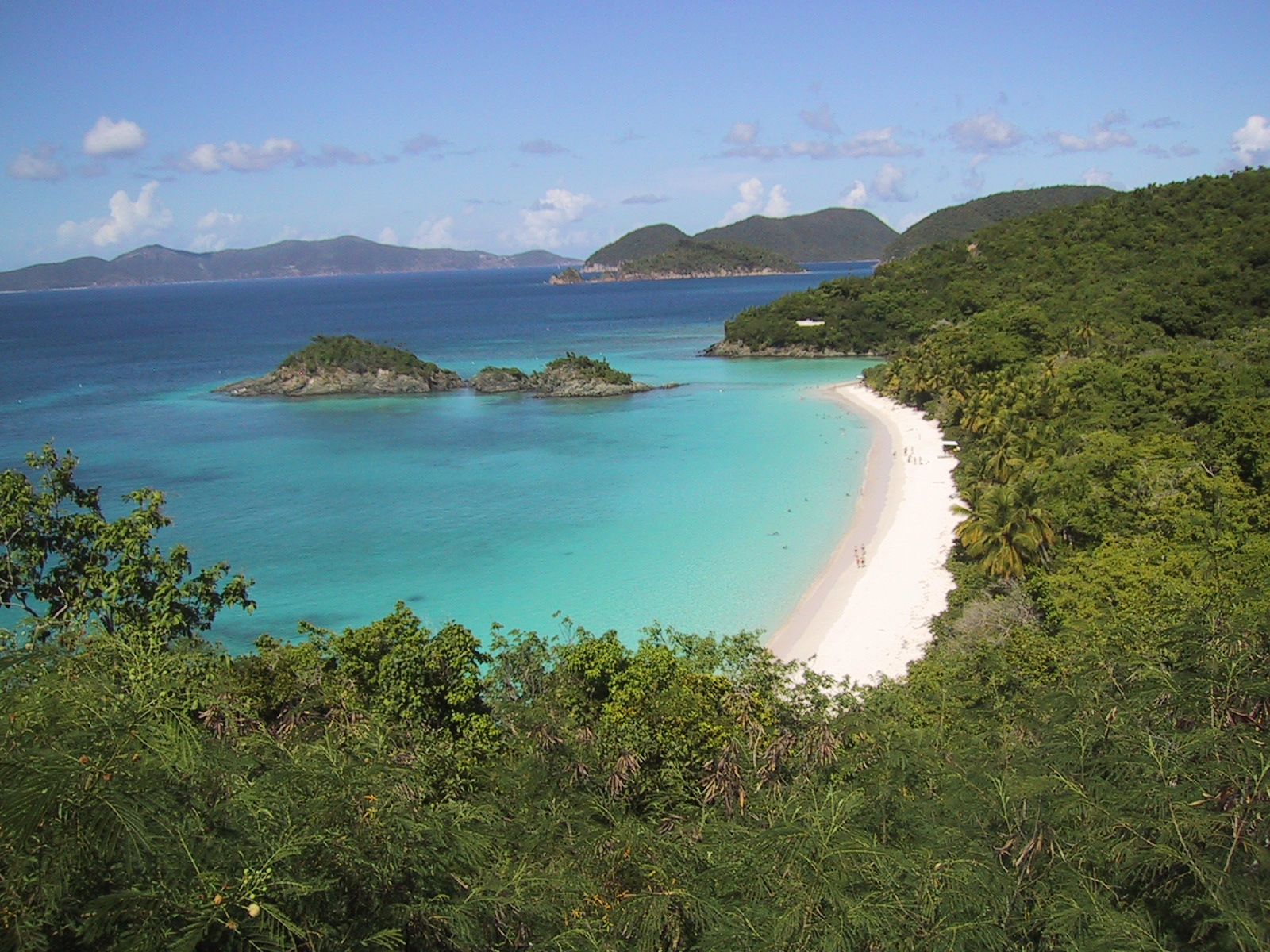
Trunk Bay

Trunk Bay is a body of water and a beach on St. John in the United States Virgin Islands. Trunk Bay is part of the Virgin Islands National Park. Trunk Bay is named for the Leatherback turtle, which is endemic to the USVI and are locally known as trunks. The beach area is divided into two halves, the main Trunk Bay beach and swim area and Burgesman Cove which is located on the west end of Trunk Bay near Jumby Bay. Its amenities include a snack bar, showers and restrooms, a lifeguard, and an underwater trail for snorkeling its coral reef. Trunk Bay has consistently been voted one of the top beaches in the world.

== Trunk Cay ==
Trunk Cay is a small grass-covered islet that sits in Trunk Bay. The cay has an elevation of 48 feet and is situated only 200 feet from Trunk Bay Beach. It is an islet of rocky cliffs, coral sandy beaches, and palm trees. The Virgin Islands National Park Service offers underwater snorkeling trails around the cay.

== Gallery ==
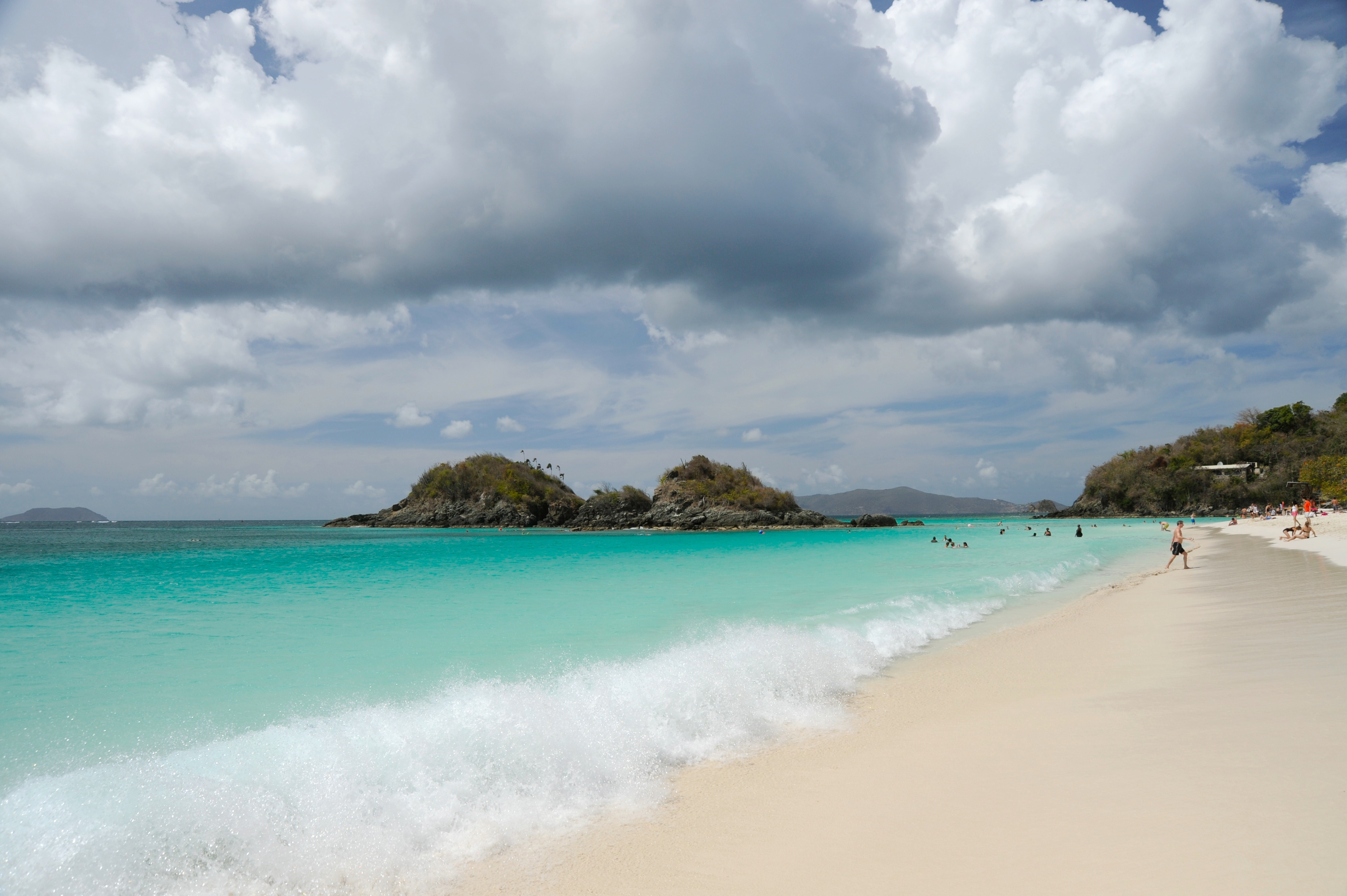

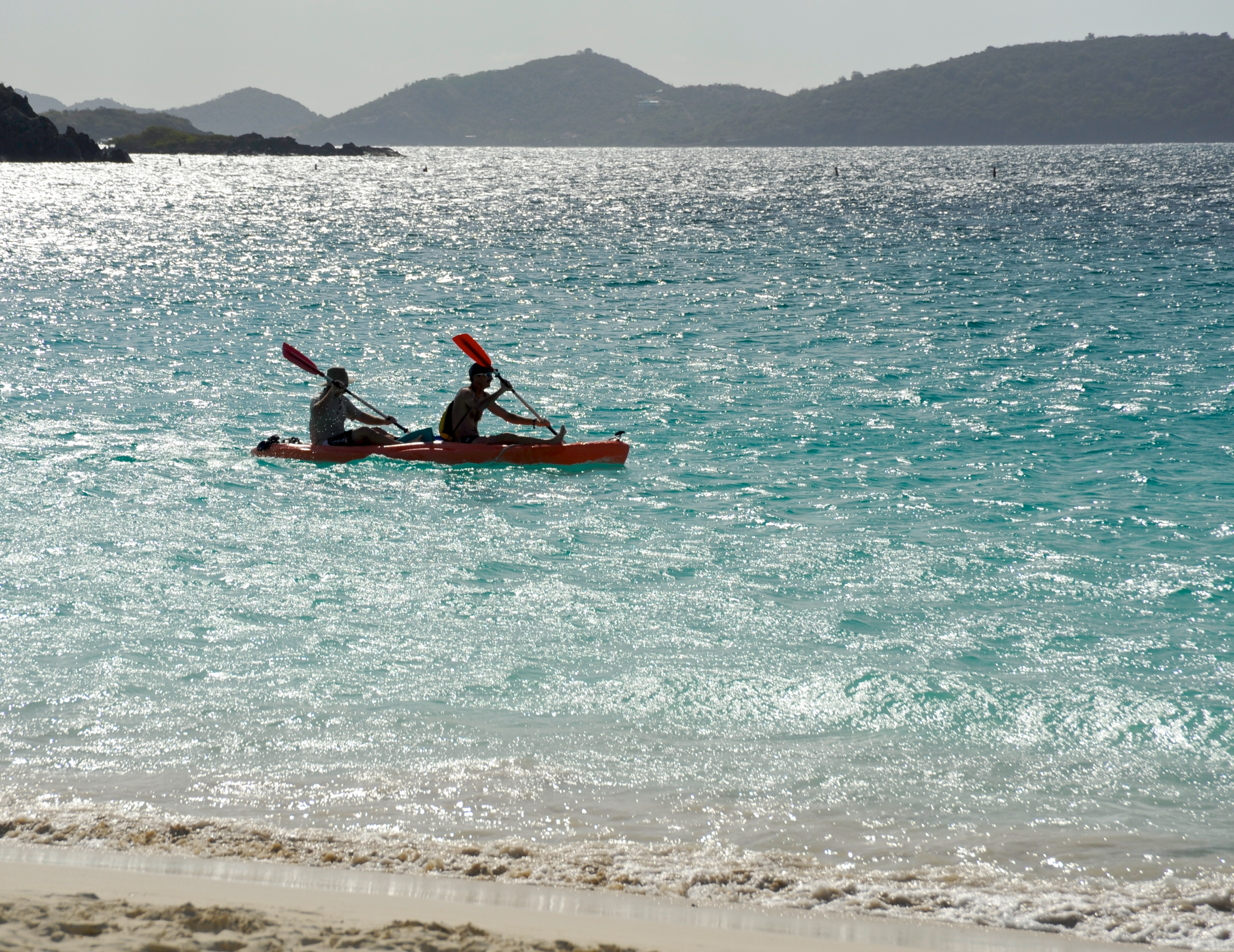

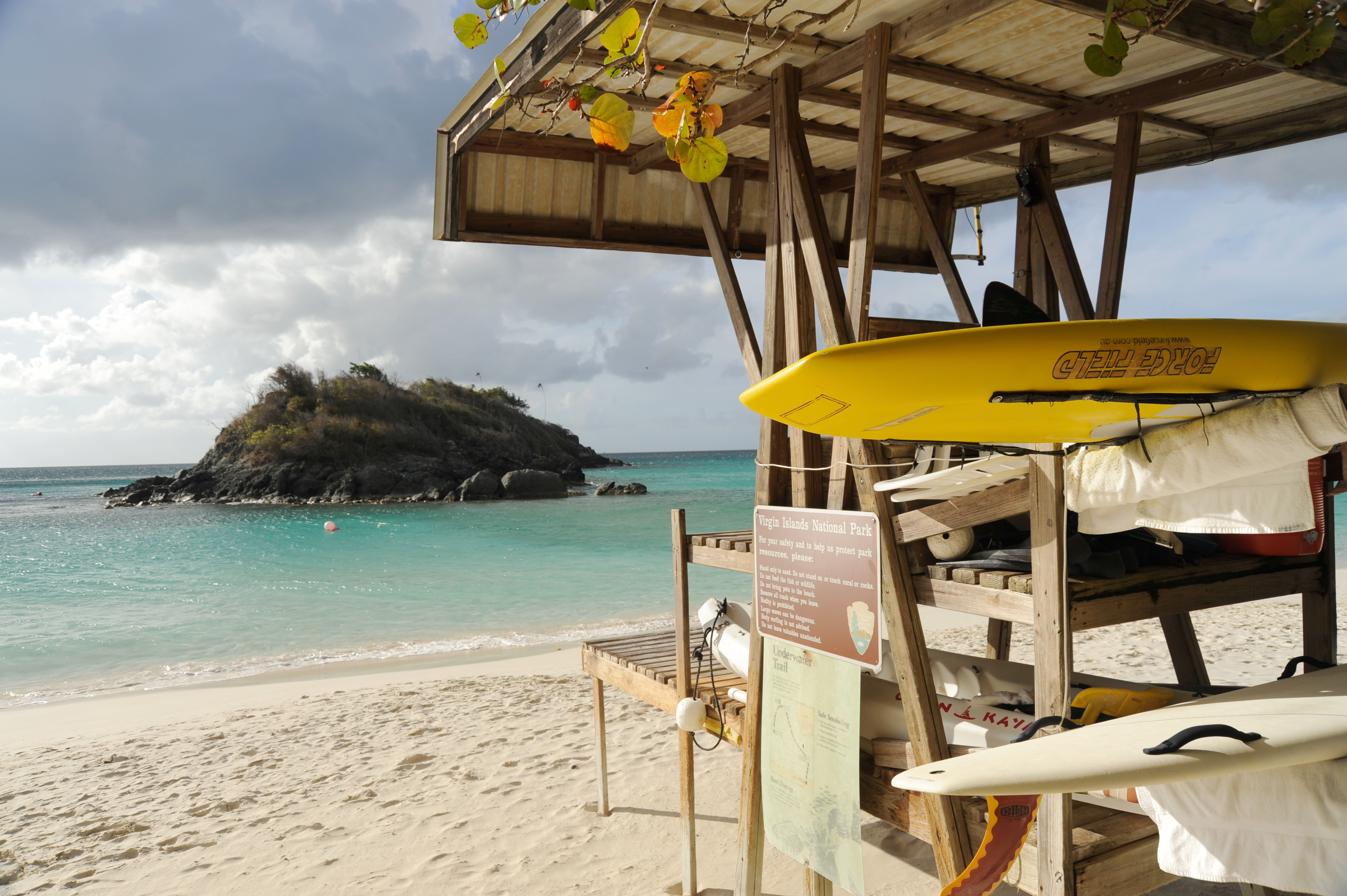

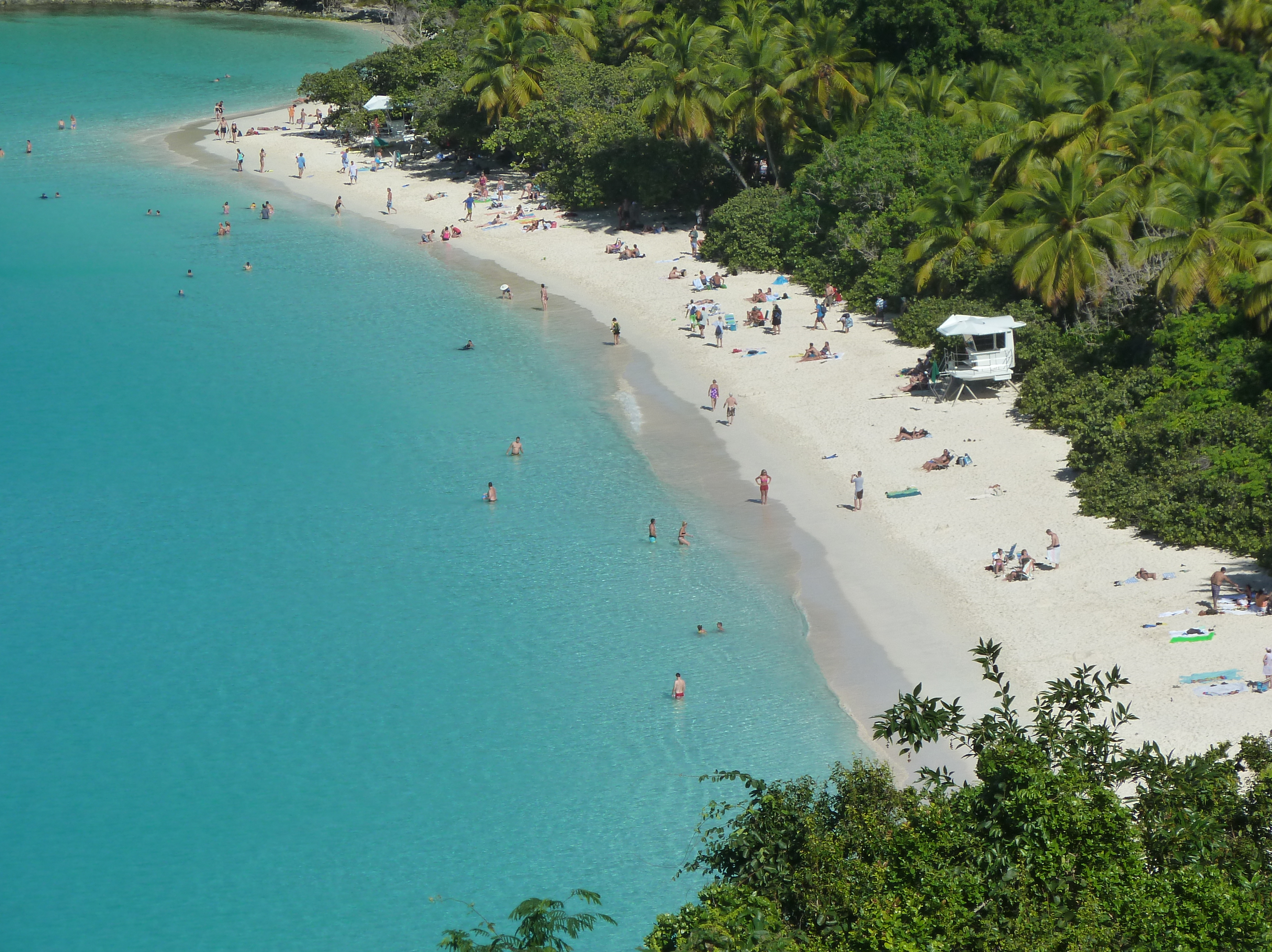
