= Reef Bay Sugar Factory Historic District =

- U.S. National Register of Historic Places
- U.S. Historic district
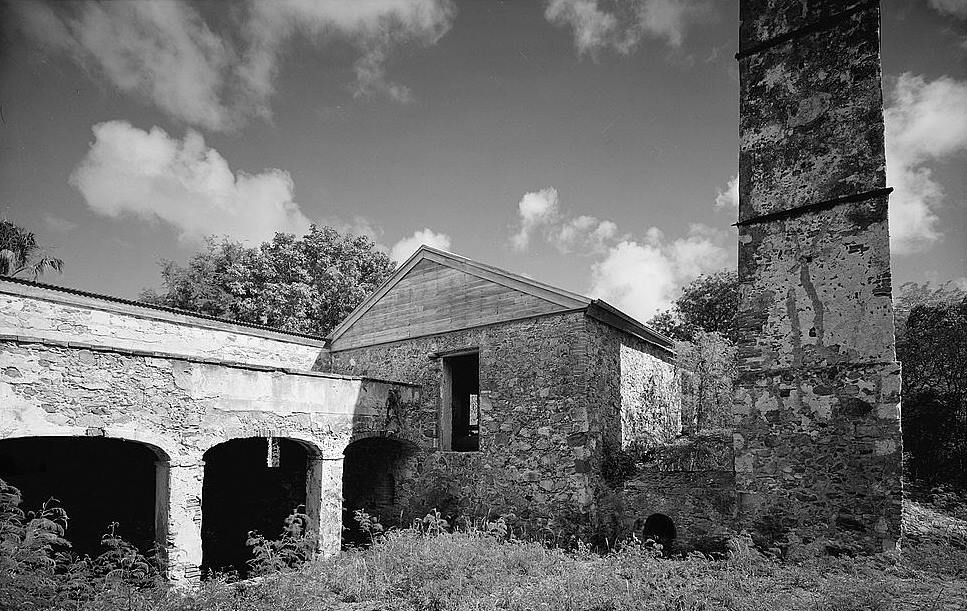
- Reef Bay Sugar Factory

- Location within the U.S. Virgin Islands
- Location: Saint John, United States Virgin Islands
- Coordinates: 18°19′30″N 64°44′42″W
- Area: 5 acres (2.0 ha)
- Built: 1800
- MPS: Virgin Islands National Park MRA
- NRHP reference No.: 81000084
- Added to NRHP: July 23, 1981

Reef Bay Sugar Factory Historic District is a historic section of Saint John, United States Virgin Islands located on the south central coast adjacent to Reef Bay. The land is the site of a sugar factory. The property was added to the U.S. National Register of Historic Places on July 23, 1981.

The historic district is part of Virgin Islands National Park. The park maintains an exhibit of a well-preserved sugar factory.

== History ==
=== Early inhabitants ===
Archaeological research shows that the first inhabitants of the Virgin Islands were Ortoiroid people. The Arawaks migrated over a period of many centuries to the Virgin Islands and engaged in the first agriculture on the land. Local archaeological excavations confirm a Classic Taíno culture on Saint John.

=== Plantation era ===
Intermittently starting in the 1670s, the land along the shorelines of Saint John was occupied by settlers with diverse nationalities. The property was used for maritime activities and cotton production.

The Danish claimed Saint John on March 25, 1718. The Danish established large plantations worked by slaves brought from Africa.

The present Reef Bay Estate was formed in the mid-19th century from two neighboring plantations near Reef Bay.

=== Par Force Estate ===
Par Force Estate was located on the east side of Reef Bay Valley and early documents indicate that the land was in use at the time of the 1733 slave insurrection on St. John with Anthony Zytzema the original owner. A 1780 maps shows Zytzema continuing to own the land and a sugar factory and animal mill on the property.

=== Reef Bay ===
An unnamed parcel of land located on the north east end of Reef Bay was identified on a 1780 map as being owned by C. Wyle and as a cattle and cotton plantation.

== Sugar factory ==
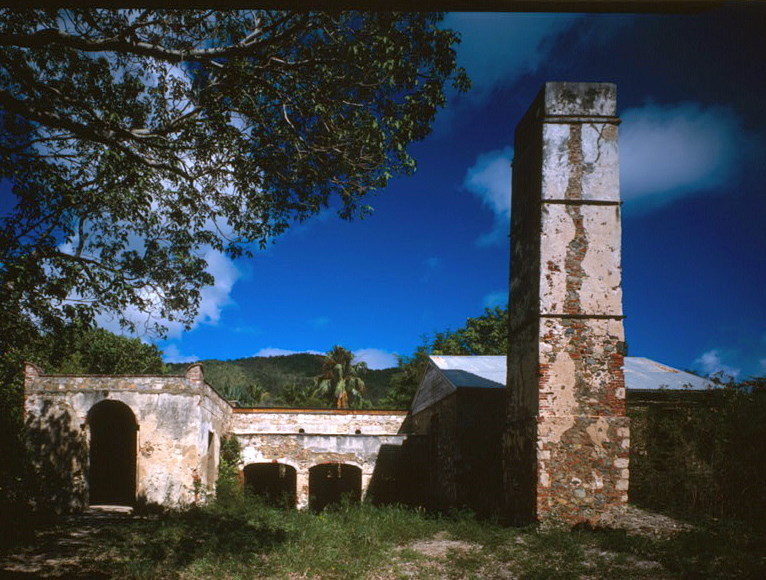
Sugar factory.

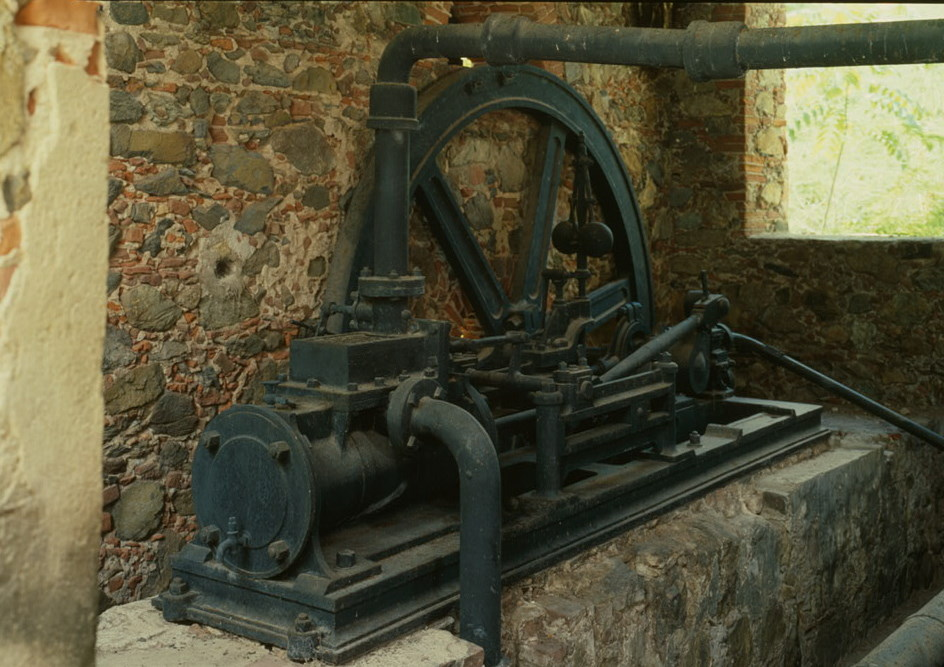
Steam-powered engine.

The first sugar plantation on the land was started in 1725 on the Par Force Estate. Oxholm's 1800 map shows a sugar plantation with an animal mill on Par Force land.

After Reef Bay Estate was formed by joining the neighboring properties, a new sugar factory was built. The factory was used for processing sugarcane into sugar and distilling rum. The factory buildings include a boiling room, an animal-powered mill, and a still with a cooling cistern for distilling rum.

O.I. Burguest and Company purchased the property in 1855. With W. H. Marsh managing the estate, the sugar factory was modernized and converted to steam in the 1862. An "engine room" measuring approximately 25 feet by 27 feet was added to house the cast iron steam engine and sugar cane crushing machinery. In 1864 Marsh purchased the property at auction and he continued to operate a sugar factory on the land until 1908. Bay Rum Oil was produced at the factory during the St. John bay rum oil boom in the early 20th century.

== Virgin Islands National Park ==
In the 1960s the sugar factory ruins were restored by Virgin Island National Park and the ruins are one of the best surviving examples of a West Indies sugar operation.
