= Virgin Islands National Park =

National Park in the US Virgin Islands

- IUCN category V (protected landscape/seascape)
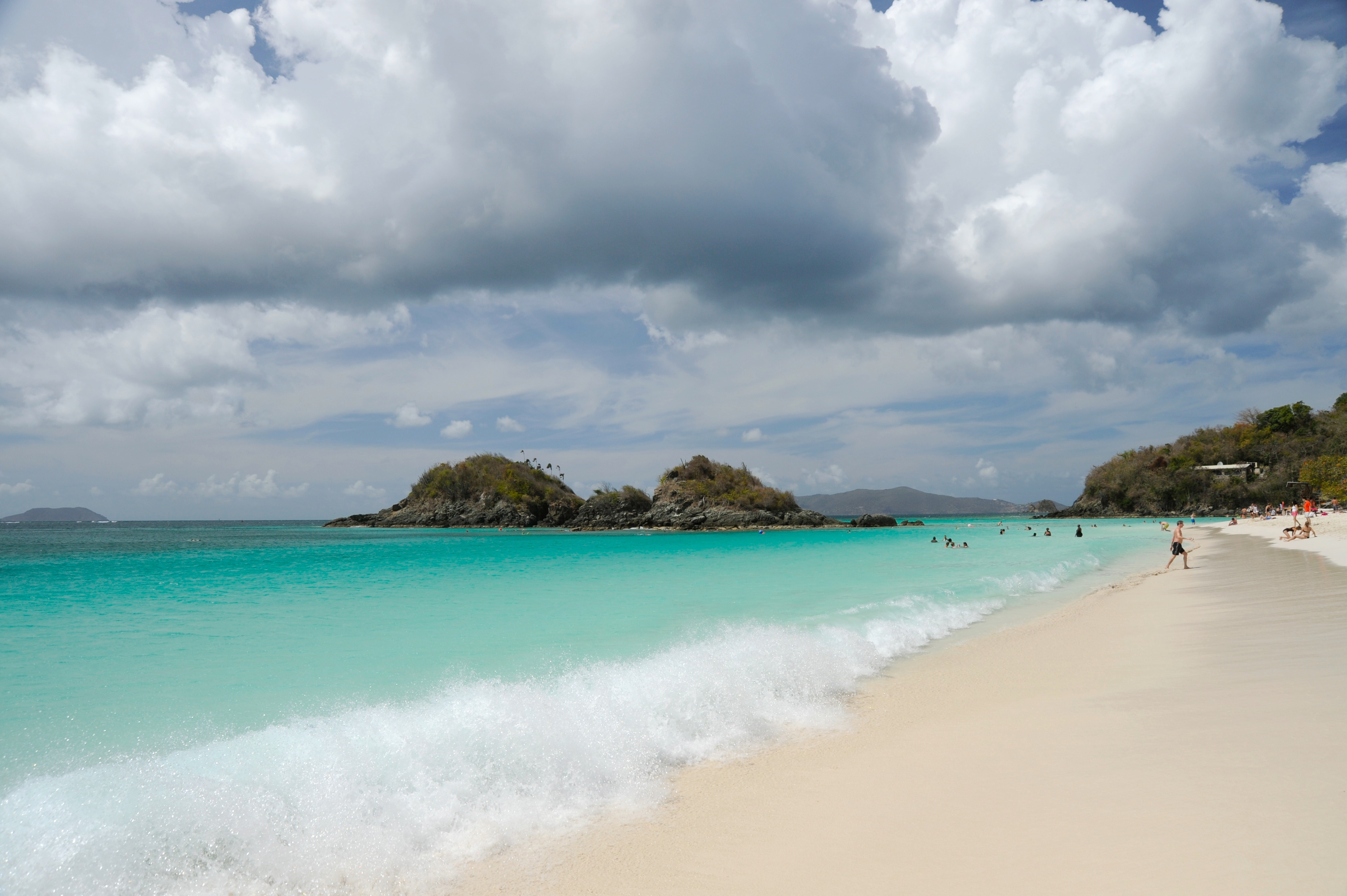
- Trunk Bay

- Location within the U.S. Virgin Islands Location within the Caribbean
- Interactive map of Virgin Islands National Park
- Location: United States Virgin Islands
- Nearest city: Charlotte Amalie
- Coordinates: 18°20′0″N 64°44′0″W
- Area: 14,737 acres (59.64 km^{2})
- Established: August 2, 1956; 69 years ago
- Visitors: 471,074 (in 2025)
- Governing body: National Park Service
- Website: www.nps.gov/viis/

The Virgin Islands National Park is a national park of the United States preserving about 60% of the land area of Saint John, U.S. Virgin Islands, as well as more than 5,500 acres (2,226 ha; 9 sq mi) of adjacent ocean, and nearly all of Hassel Island, just off the Charlotte Amalie, Saint Thomas harbor.

The park is well known for scuba diving and snorkeling, and has miles of hiking trails through the tropical rainforest.

Cruz Bay is the gateway port to the park, as well as the visitor center location. Ferries operate hourly from Red Hook, St. Thomas, thrice daily from Charlotte Amalie, St. Thomas and West End, Tortola, twice daily from Jost Van Dyke, and twice weekly from Virgin Gorda.

Two category 5 hurricanes impacted the Virgin Islands in September 2017, Irma and Maria. The park received 112,287 visitors in 2018, after having received 304,408 visitors in 2017, and an average of more than 450,000 visitors per year in the preceding ten-year period from 2007 to 2016. The park was reopened in December 2017 with all roads, trails and beaches declared accessible to visitors.

== Park purpose ==
As stated in the foundation document:

The purpose of Virgin Islands National Park is to preserve and protect for public benefit and inspiration outstanding scenic features, Caribbean tropical marine and terrestrial ecosystems in their natural conditions, and cultural heritage from pre-Columbian through Danish colonial times.

== History ==
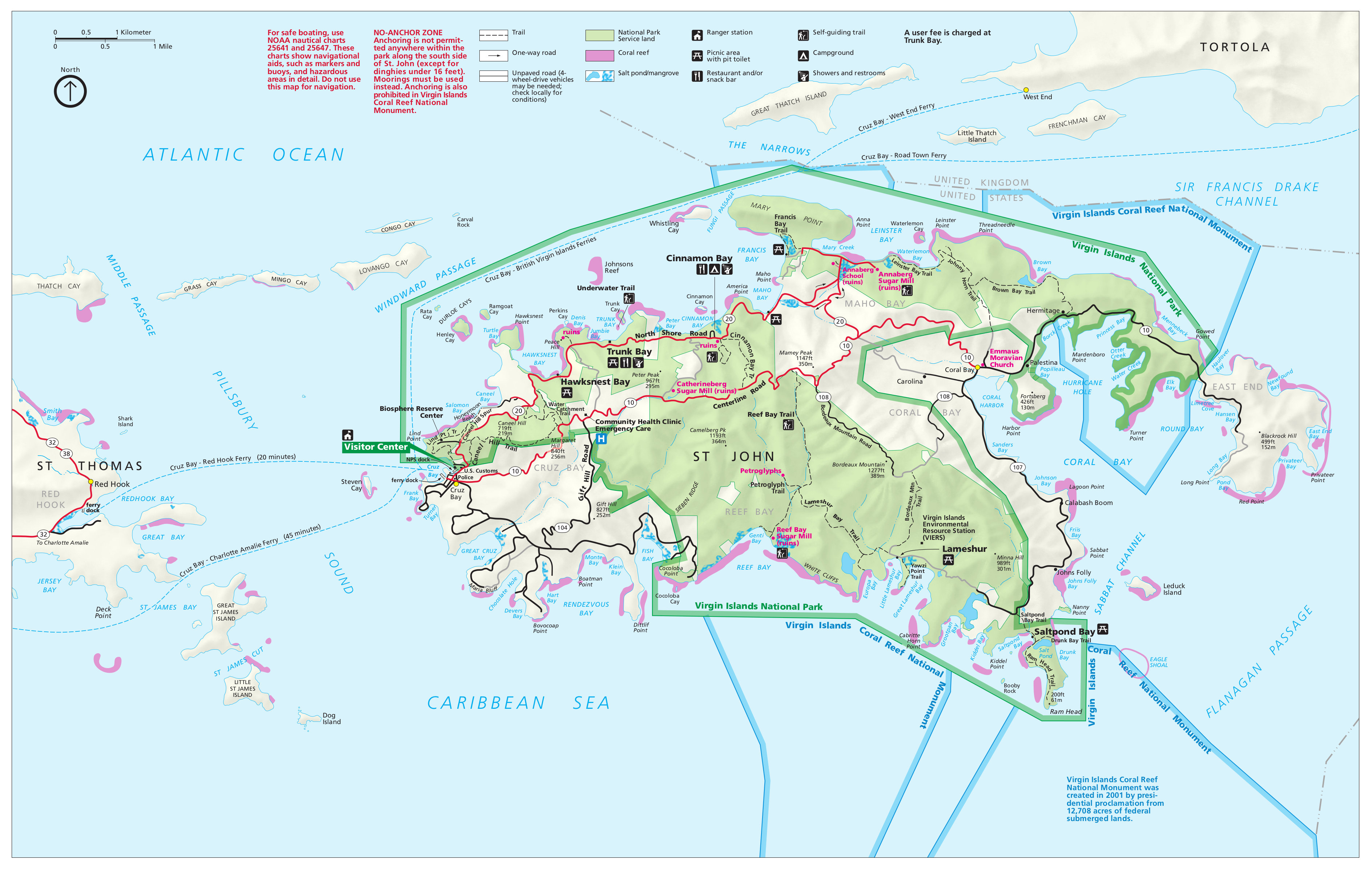
Park map (click on map to enlarge)

In 1956, Laurance Rockefeller's Jackson Hole Preserve donated its extensive lands on the island to the National Park Service, under the condition that the lands had to be protected from future development. The remaining portion, the Caneel Bay Resort, operates on a lease arrangement with the NPS, which owns the underlying land.

The boundaries of the Virgin Islands National Park include 75% of the island, but various in-holdings within the park boundary (e.g., Peter Bay, Maho Bay) reduce the park lands to 60% of the island acreage.

Much of the island's waters, coral reefs, and shoreline have been protected by being included in the national park. This protection was expanded in 2001, when the Virgin Islands Coral Reef National Monument was created.

In 2006, The Trust for Public Land purchased the 415-acre (167.9 ha) Estate Maho Bay for preservation. The property includes beaches, undisturbed forest as well as historic Danish colonial and Taíno Indian artifacts. The trust intends to sell the property to the National Park Service as federal funds become available. In 2011, the trust donated 18 acres at Mamey's Peak to the National Park Service. In 2012, the National Park Service purchased 58 acres from the trust for $2.25 million, using money from the federal Land and Water Conservation Fund. In 2013, an additional 72 acres of the Estate Maho Bay property was sold to the National Park Service for $2.5 million, the largest addition to the park.

Hurricanes Irma and Maria, both category 5 hurricanes, impacted the Virgin Islands in September 2017. The park was reopened in December 2017 with all roads, trails and beaches declared accessible to visitors. The park received 112,287 visitors in 2018, after having received 304,408 visitors in 2017, and an average of more than 450,000 visitors per year in the preceding ten-year period from 2007 to 2016.

== Attractions ==
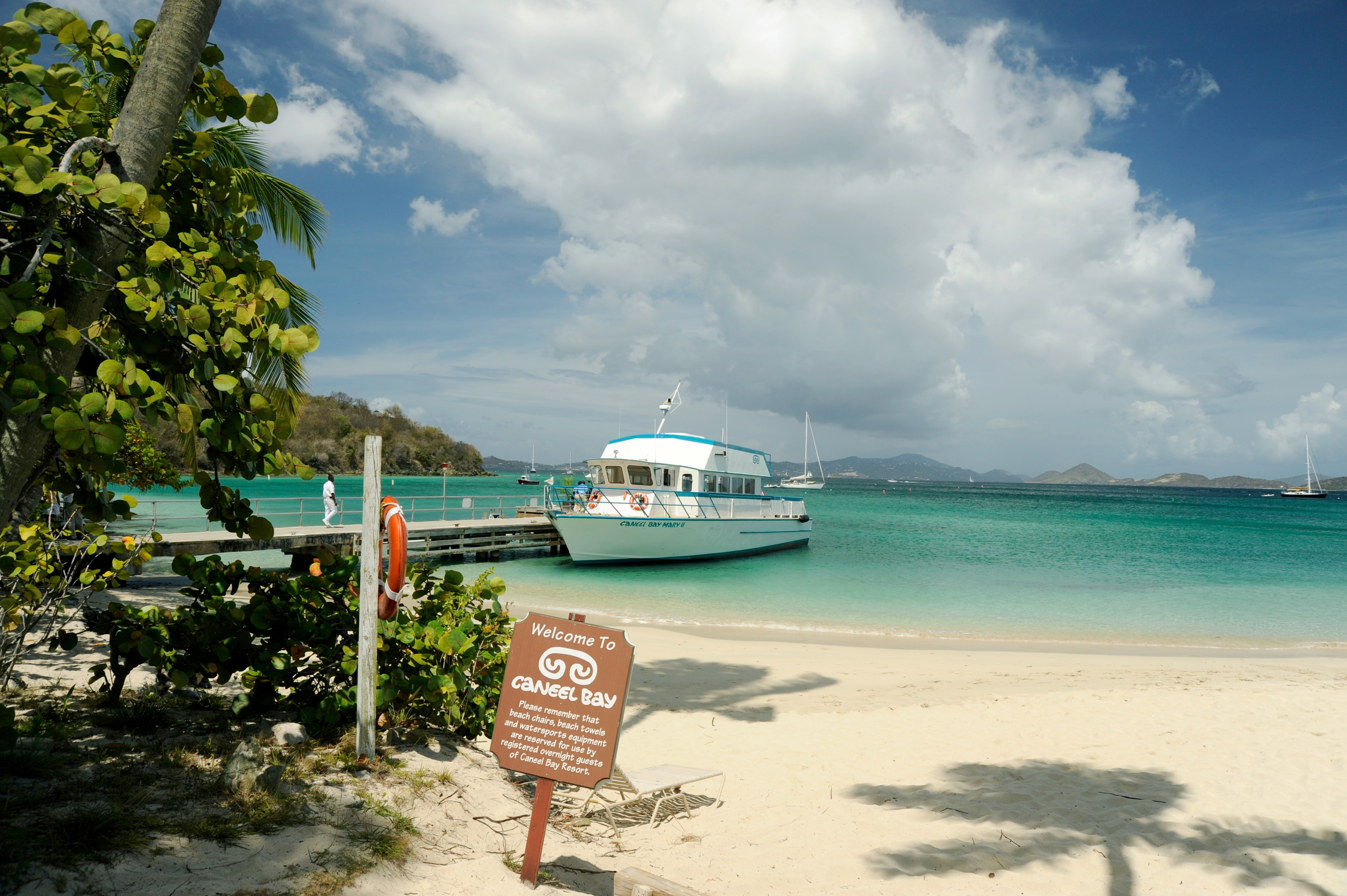
Caneel Bay

Beaches, coral reefs, hiking trails, and natural sites are the park's main attractions.

Visitors can stay in numerous resorts, hotels, and vacation villas near the park on St. John. Cinnamon Bay Campground is located inside the park, as is Caneel Bay Resort on the north shore which lies on Rockefeller's former personal estate. Overnight and day use mooring balls are available to boaters.

=== Beaches ===
The beaches of Virgin Islands National Park are regularly named some of the best in the world.

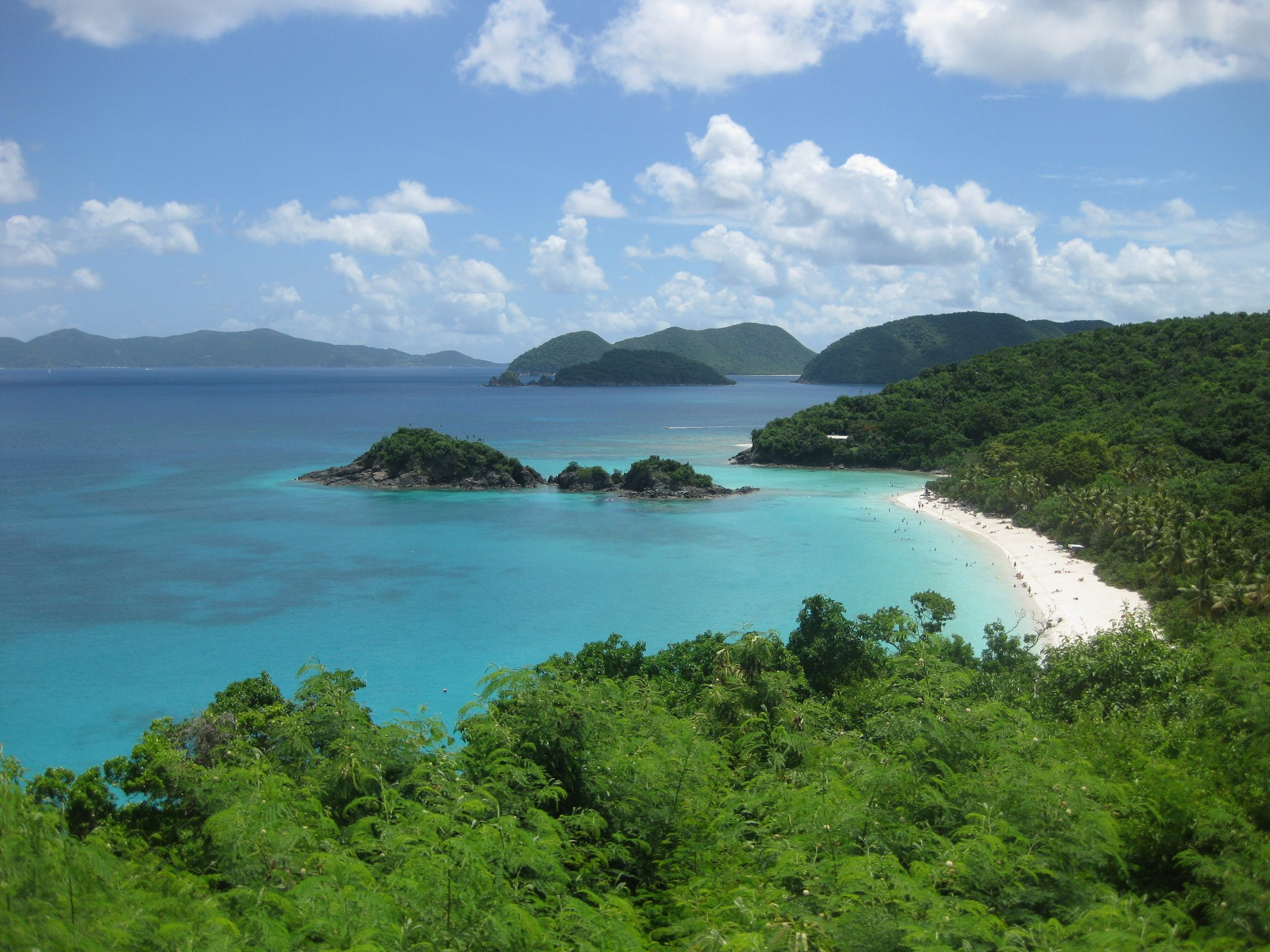
Trunk Bay

Trunk Bay is a body of water and the adjacent beach on Saint John. Trunk Bay has an underwater trail for snorkeling along its coral reef. The beach area is divided into two halves, the main Trunk Bay beach and swim area, and Burgesman Cove which is located on the west end of Trunk Bay near Jumbie Bay.

Cinnamon Bay beach is a long, wide stretch of sand on the north shore of St. John. The beach is popular for sunbathing, snorkeling, and water sports. The bay is also home to the Cinnamon Bay Campground and water sports rental.

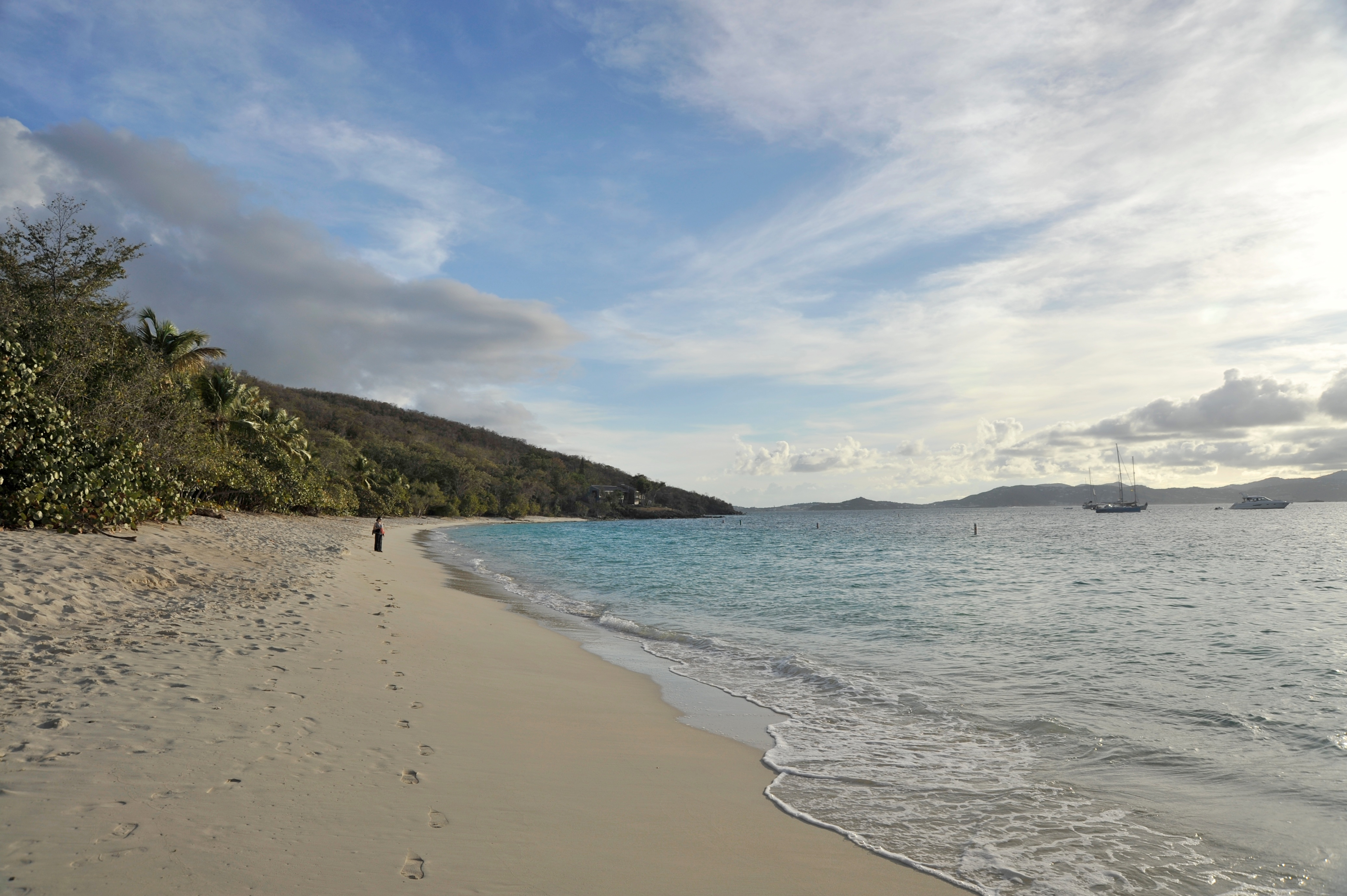
Honeymoon Beach

Honeymoon Beach is on the north shore of St. John and can be accessed from Cruz Bay by hiking the 1 mile (1.6 km) long Lind Point Trail or from Caneel Bay Resort. The beach features soft white sand under tall palm trees. Kayaks and snorkel equipment are available for rent.

Maho Bay is known for its soft sand and calm, shallow waters. The sand and seagrass sea floor make it a good place to see sea turtles and stingrays.

Located on St. John's south shore, Salt Pond Bay is a protected bay and beach. The beach can be reached by hiking a short trail from Route 107, about 4 miles (6.4 km) south of Coral Bay. The bay is a popular snorkeling spot and has fringing reefs on both sides of the bay, sea grass in the center, and a deep coral reef far out in the middle of the bay. Overnight and day use mooring balls are available for boaters. From Salt Pond Bay, hikers can access Drunk Bay and Ram Head Trail.

=== Hiking ===
The Cinnamon Bay Nature Trail passes sugar plantation ruins, while the Bordeaux Mountain Trail leads to the highest point on the island at 1,277 feet (389 m) above sea level.

The Reef Bay Trail offers views of forests, remnants of sugar mills, historical Taíno petroglyph rock carvings, a spring-fed waterfall and reflection pool, as well as snorkeling over the coral reef at Genti Bay. The hike is strenuous and the round trip from Centerline Road is more than 6 miles (9.7 km). A ranger-guided hike is offered, including a boat ride back to Cruz Bay from Reef Bay.

The Bordeaux Mountain Trail is a steep and rocky path leading from Little Lameshur Bay to the highest point of the island. The trail is unmaintained and although there are several overlooks along the way, there is no view from the top of this densely forested mountain. The trail gains almost 1,300 feet (396 m) in about 1 mile (1.6 km).

The 1 mile (1.6 km) long Lind Point Trail begins in Cruz Bay, behind the Virgin Islands National Park Visitor Center. The trail leads up to Lind Point, overlooking Cruz Bay harbor, before continuing on to Honeymoon Beach.

Starting in Cruz Bay, just north of Mongoose Junction, the Caneel Hill Trail leads up a steep incline to the top of Caneel Hill. A wooden observation platform is at the summit with views of St. John, St. Thomas, Jost Van Dyke, and many smaller islands. On a clear day, a hiker may see St. Croix and even Puerto Rico.

Beginning at Salt Pond Bay, the Ram Head Trail travels about 1 mile (1.6 km) down a dry and rocky peninsula to the southernmost point on St. John.

Across from the entrance to Cinnamon Bay Campground, the Cinnamon Bay Nature Trail is a 0.5-mile (0.8 km) loop winding through the ruins of a sugar factory. Signs along the path explain the history of the area. The trail is a mixture of boardwalks and paved paths with no steep hills.

=== Historic sites ===
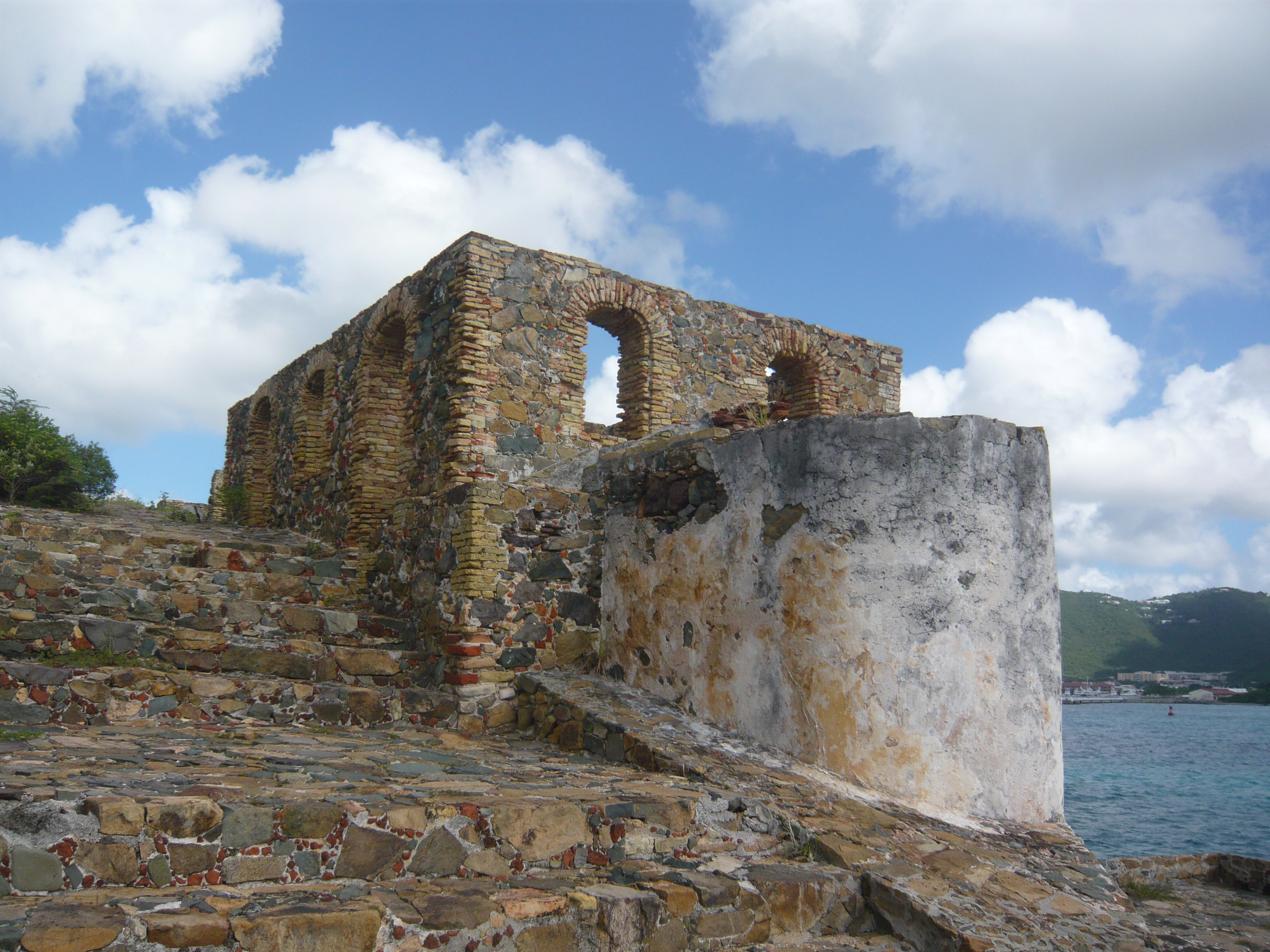
Fort Willoughby, Hassel Island

The park protects dozens of historic ruins from the colonial and plantation eras through the 1950s.

The Annaberg Historic District protects a partially restored sugar factory and windmill located just east of Mary's Point. National park signage guides visitors through the ruins and explains the process of turning sugar cane into molasses. Volunteers and park rangers are frequently in the area to answer questions. The bake house hosts cooking demonstrations and offers samples of dumb bread. The windmill is located on Annaberg Point, which offers views of Tortola, Great Thatch Island, and the Narrows.

The ruins of the Reef Bay Sugar Factory Historic District can be reached via Reef Bay Trail or L'Esperance trail.

The Reef Bay Trail petroglyphs are Taíno rock carvings located on rock pools near a waterfall. They can be reached via a 0.25-mile (0.4 km) long spur trail from Reef Bay Trail. The petroglyph site was added to the National Register of Historic Places in 1982.

The well-preserved Catherineberg Sugar Mill Ruins are among the most easily accessed in the park, and include a windmill tower and a horse mill.

== Geography ==
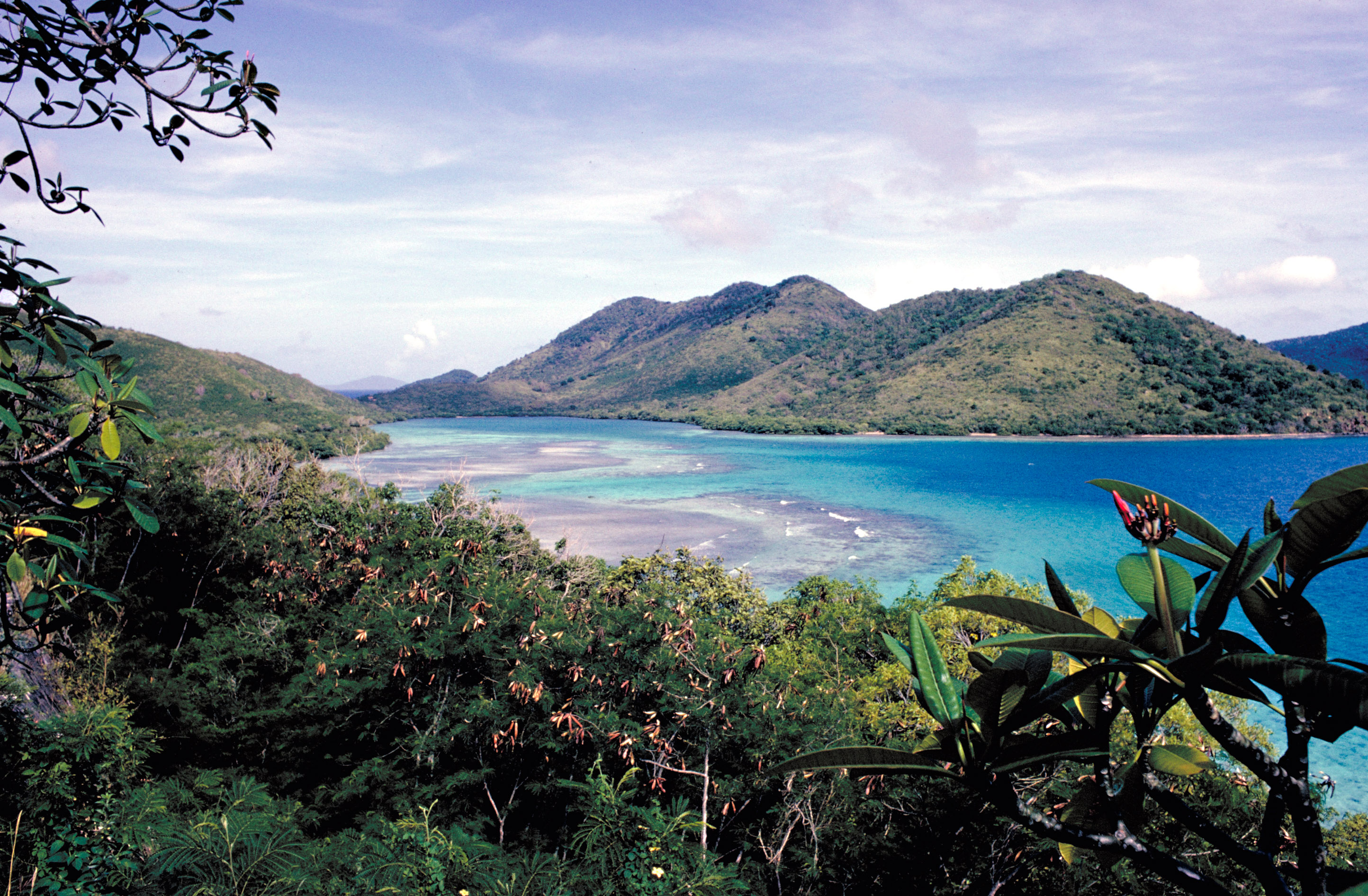
Mary Point as seen from Annaberg

Virgin Islands National Park encompasses 14,737 acres (5,964 ha; 23 sq mi) of land and ocean. The park covers almost 60 percent of St. John Island, adjacent ocean, and almost all of Hassel Island.

The main features are coral reefs, which almost completely surround the park, and the ocean waters, tropical forests and beaches.

== Wildlife ==
Wild donkeys, deer, mongoose, pigs, goats, birds, iguanas, skinks, tortoises, frogs, fish, and crabs inhabit the park. Bats are the only native land mammal in the park.

The park has been recognised as an Important Bird Area (IBA) by BirdLife International because it supports populations of bridled quail-doves, green-throated caribs, Antillean crested hummingbirds, brown pelicans, Caribbean elaenias, Puerto Rican flycatchers, pearly-eyed thrashers and Lesser Antillean bullfinches.

== Climate ==
According to the Köppen climate classification system, Virgin Islands National Park has a tropical savanna wet and dry climate (Aw). Class A tropical climates have an average temperature of 18 °C (64.4 °F) or higher in every month of the year, with significant annual precipitation. Class Aw climates have a pronounced dry season, with the driest month having precipitation less than 60 mm (2.36 in) and less than 1/25 of the total annual precipitation.

The average rainfall per year is 55 inches (1,400 mm). In the winter, trade winds blow from 11 knots (13 mph; 20 km/h) to 21 knots (24 mph; 39 km/h). The average temperature for the park is 79 °F (26 °C).

The park experiences very little temperature variation between summer and winter, while the sea is warm year-round. The main tourist season is from December to April, which are the driest months. During the remaining months (i.e., the Atlantic hurricane season), prices for accommodations are reduced considerably. Camping and rustic lodging are available in the park from November through August at Cinnamon Bay Campground. Caneel Bay Resort provides luxury accommodations along with upscale dining in the park from November through July.

== Geology ==
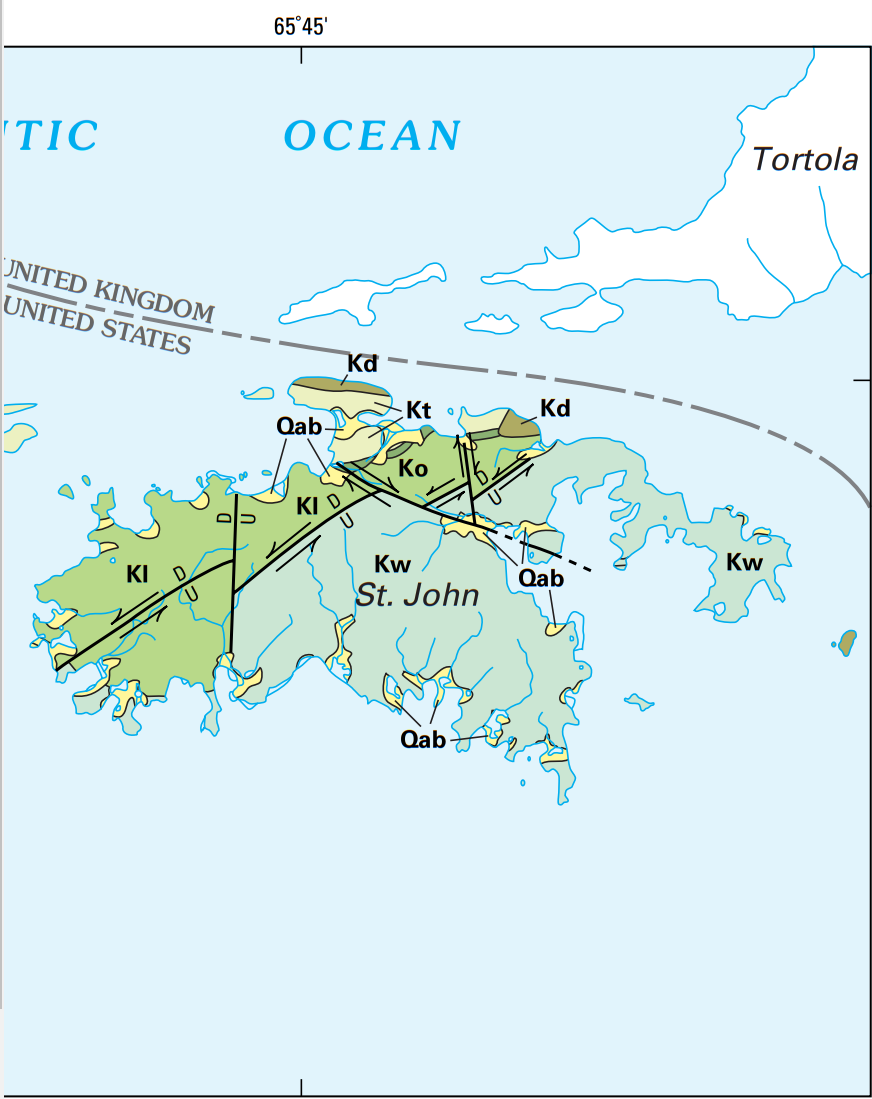
Geological map of St. John

Located at the east end of the Greater Antilles, St. John resides on the northeastern end of the Caribbean Plate. The island formed during the Cretaceous with the eruption of the Water Island Formation, consisting of keratophyres and pillow basalts. Igneous activity then changed to that of an island arc, characterized by the Louisenhoj Formation, consisting of andesite and basalt. Volcanism abated during the deposition of the Outer Brass Limestone. Volcanism resumed as evidenced by the Late Cretaceous Tutu Formation, consisting of volcaniclastic turbidites, basalt, and andesite. A diabase dike swarm followed and then compressive folding attributed to the Caribbean Plate colliding with the Bahama Platform. The Late Eocene saw the intrusion of Narrows pluton and Virgin Gorda batholith, associated with the Greater Antilles arc magmatism, and more compressive folding associated with the spreading of the Cayman Trough. This spreading is also tied to sinistral strike-slip faulting at 39 Ma.

== See also ==
- List of national parks of the United States
- Leinster Bay, U.S. Virgin Islands
