= List of U.S. Virgin Islands locations by per capita income =

This is a list of U.S. Virgin Islands locations by per capita income. In the 2010 U.S. census, the U.S. Virgin Islands had a per capita income of $21,362 and a median household income of $37,254.

== U.S. Virgin Islands counties ranked by per capita income ==
Note: The U.S. Virgin Islands does not have counties. The U.S. Census Bureau counts each of the 3 main islands of the U.S. Virgin Islands as county-equivalents.

Rank	Island	Per capita income (2010)	Median household income (2010)
1	Saint John Island	$25,730	$40,644
2	Saint Thomas Island	$22,458	$38,232
3	Saint Croix Island	$19,883	$36,042

== U.S. Virgin Islands sub-districts ranked by per capita income ==
The U.S. Census Bureau divides the 3 islands of the U.S. Virgin Islands into 20 statistical sub-districts. This is a list of the sub-districts ranked by per capita income (2010 U.S. Census).

Rank	Sub-district	Per capita income (2010)	Median household income (2010)
1	East End (Saint Croix)	$38,165	$56,806
2	Water Island	$33,496	$47,917
3	Northside (Saint Thomas)	$33,339	$53,784
4	East End (Saint John)	$33,111	$37,500
5	Central (Saint John)	$31,655	$43,333
6	West End (Saint Thomas)	$29,117	$56,848
7	Cruz Bay	$24,271	$40,472
8	Anna's Hope	$24,101	$49,500
9	Coral Bay	$24,082	$37,083
10	Southside (Saint Thomas)	$22,882	$41,010
11	East End (Saint Thomas)	$22,748	$38,766
12	Sion Farm	$21,807	$40,547
13	Tutu	$19,459	$38,732
14	Northwest (Saint Croix)	$19,023	$31,910
15	Northcentral (Saint Croix)	$18,412	$32,337
16	Christiansted	$17,143	$23,816
17	Southwest (Saint Croix)	$16,882	$33,524
18	Charlotte Amalie	$16,483	$28,965
19	Southcentral (Saint Croix)	$16,215	$33,883
20	Frederiksted	$14,645	$24,933
