= Anna's Retreat, U.S. Virgin Islands =

Anna's Retreat
- Census-Designated Place
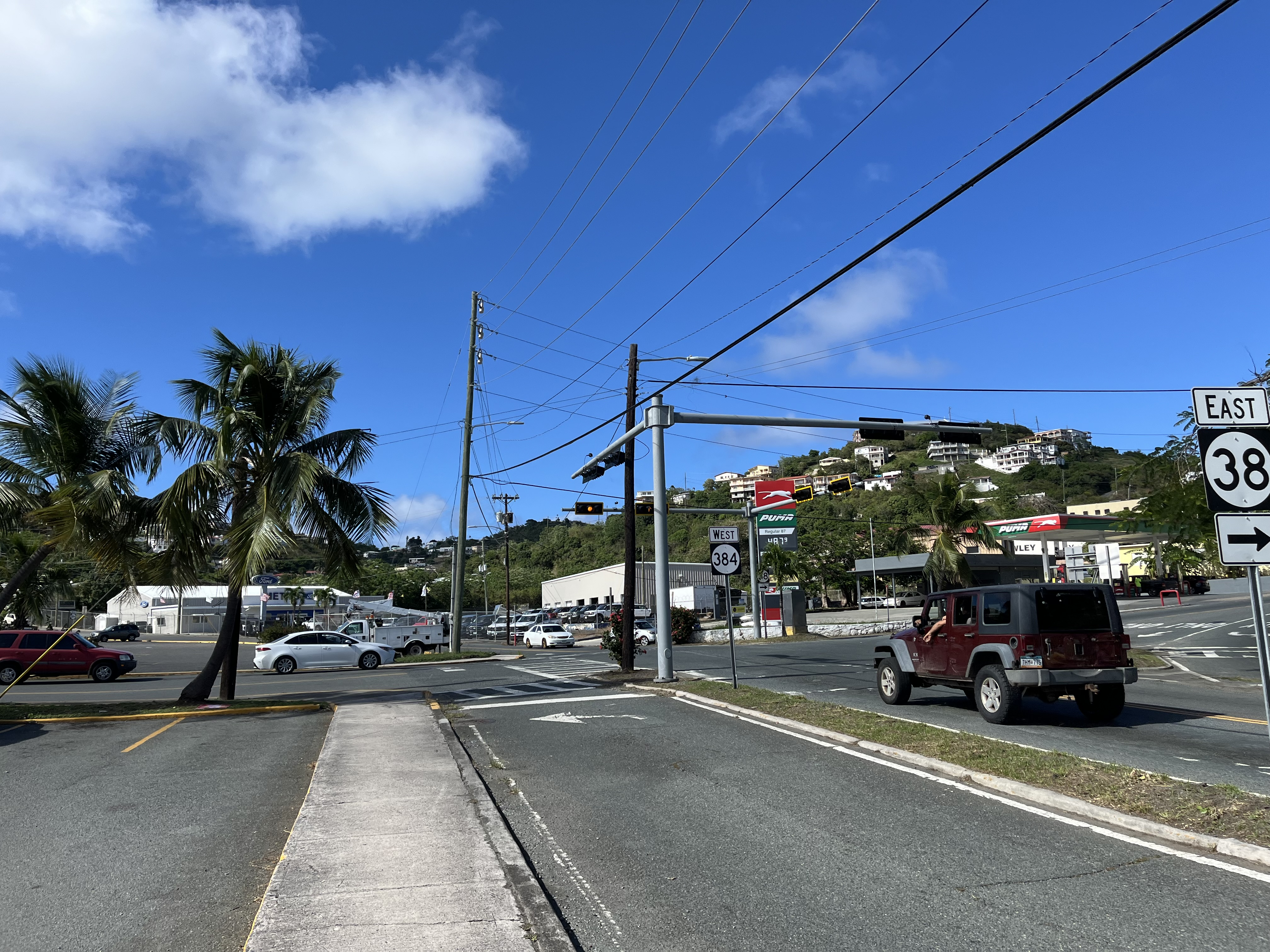
- Nickname: Tutu
- Location within the United States Virgin Islands
- Coordinates: 18°20′N 64°53′W
- Country: United States
- Territory: U.S. Virgin Islands
- Administrative District: Saint Thomas-Saint John
- Island (Census District): Saint Thomas
- Subdistrict(s): Tutu, Northside, Southside

Population (2020)
  - Total: 5,519
- ZIP code: 00802, 00805
- Area code: 340

Anna's Retreat is a suburban census-designated place (CDP) predominantly in the administrative subdistrict of Tutu in St. Thomas, U.S. Virgin Islands. Small portions of the CDP are in the Northside and Southside subdistricts. The census refers to the CDP as Tutu as do others because it covers almost the entire subdistrict. As of 2020, the population was 5519, making Anna's Retreat the second-largest town or CDP in the U.S. Virgin Islands after the territorial capital, Charlotte Amalie.

St. Thomas, Subdistricts, towns, and CDPs

Unlike many other parts of the territory, tourists are not often present in the CDP. The CDP's commercial area caters more to the needs of locals, unlike Charlotte Amalie, Charlotte Amalie West and Charlotte Amalie East which all does both.

== Education ==
The Joseph Gomez Elementary School and the Emanuel Benjamin Oliver Elementary school serve Anna's Retreat.

== Demographics ==
=== 2020 Census ===
Tutu CDP, U.S. Virgin Islands – Racial and ethnic composition Note: the US Census treats Hispanic/Latino as an ethnic category. This table excludes Latinos from the racial categories and assigns them to a separate category. Hispanics/Latinos may be of any race.
Race / Ethnicity (NH = Non-Hispanic)	Pop 2020	% 2020
White alone (NH)	50	0.91%
Black or African American alone (NH)	4,855	87.97%
Native American or Alaska Native alone (NH)	2	0.04%
Asian alone (NH)	13	0.24%
Native Hawaiian or Pacific Islander alone (NH)	0	0.00%
Other race alone (NH)	21	0.38%
Mixed race or Multiracial (NH)	163	2.95%
Hispanic or Latino (any race)	415	7.52%
Total	5,534	100.00%

== Geography ==
Anna's Retreat is located on the east side of Saint Thomas.

=== Climate ===
According to the Köppen system, Anna’s Retreat has a tropical savanna climate, abbreviated Aw on climate maps.

== Shopping ==
Anna's Retreat is one of the biggest shopping districts in the U.S. Virgin Islands and is also home to Tutu Park Mall.

== Transportation ==
Anna's Retreat is the second most accessible town or CDP on the island of St. Thomas by ground transportation. It is also not the only town or CDP on the island that is not accessible by sea.

=== Public Transit ===
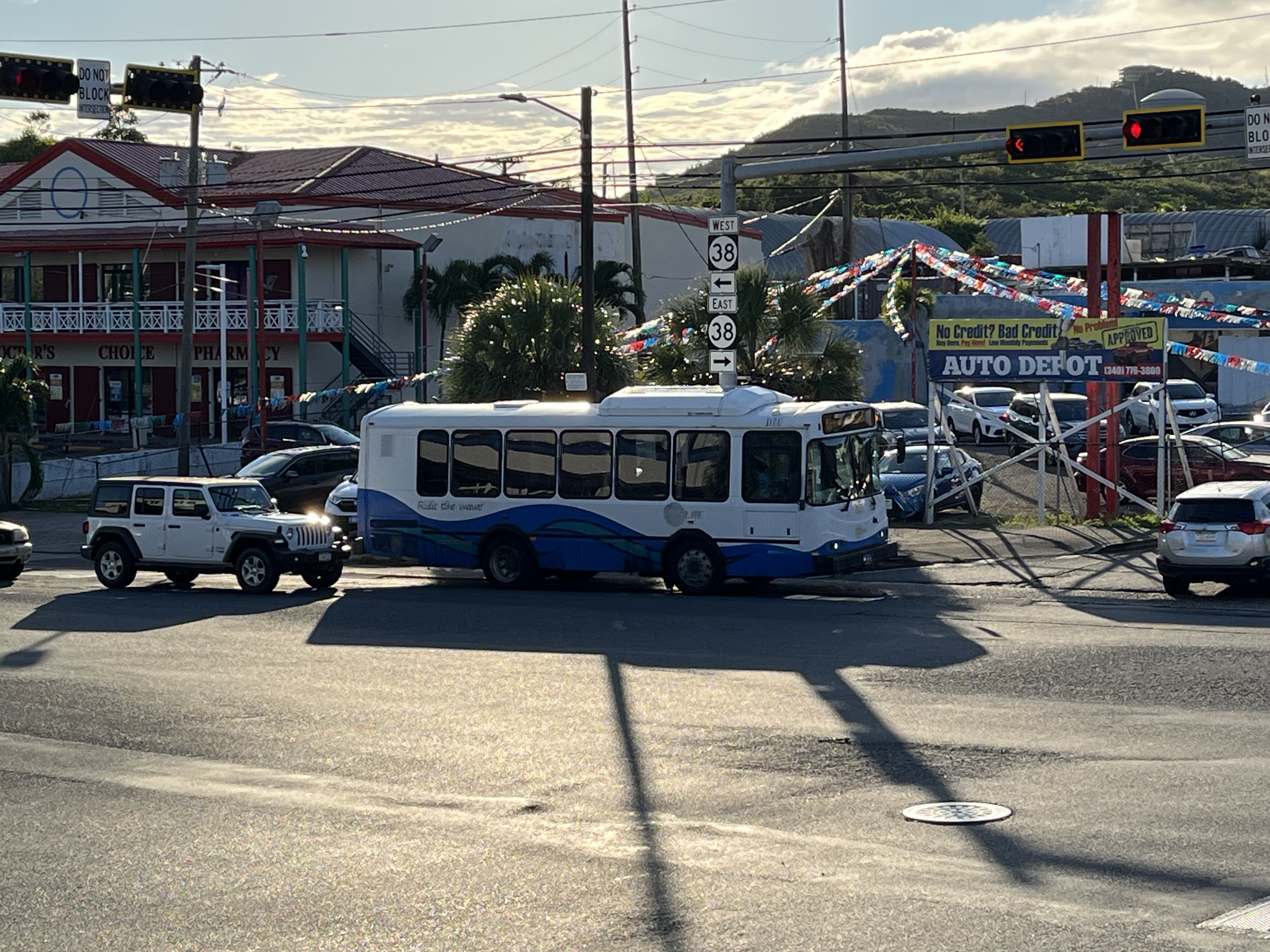
VITRAN bus on St Thomas.

The VITRAN (Virgin Island Public Transit) system is a comprehensive public transportation system serving the U.S. Virgin Islands. The system encompasses various modes of transportation, including buses, paratransit services and ferries but the bus and paratransit service are the only modes of transport that are available within the Anna's Retreat.

==== Public Fixed Path Transit ====
All VITRAN bus routes on St. Thomas serve the CDP of Anna's Retreat. Below of the list of bus routes, current and past:

- VITRAN 301 - Contant/Donoe/Hidden Valley,
- VITRAN 401 - Contant/Red Hook via Smith Bay,
- VITRAN 501 - Contant/Bovoni via Tutu Park Mall,
- VITRAN 601 - Contant/Old & New Tutu via Tutu Park Mall.

==== Public Paratransit Service ====
The paratransit service provided by VITRAN is a specialized transportation system designed to serve individuals with disabilities who cannot access the regular fixed public transit services. This service adheres to the guidelines of the Americans with Disabilities Act (ADA), ensuring accessible transportation for elderly, those with mobility issues and disabled residents and visitors. This VITRAN service include door-to-door or curb-to-curb transport and advanced reservation systems at half the price of the fixed path transist.

=== Alternative Fixed Path Transit ===
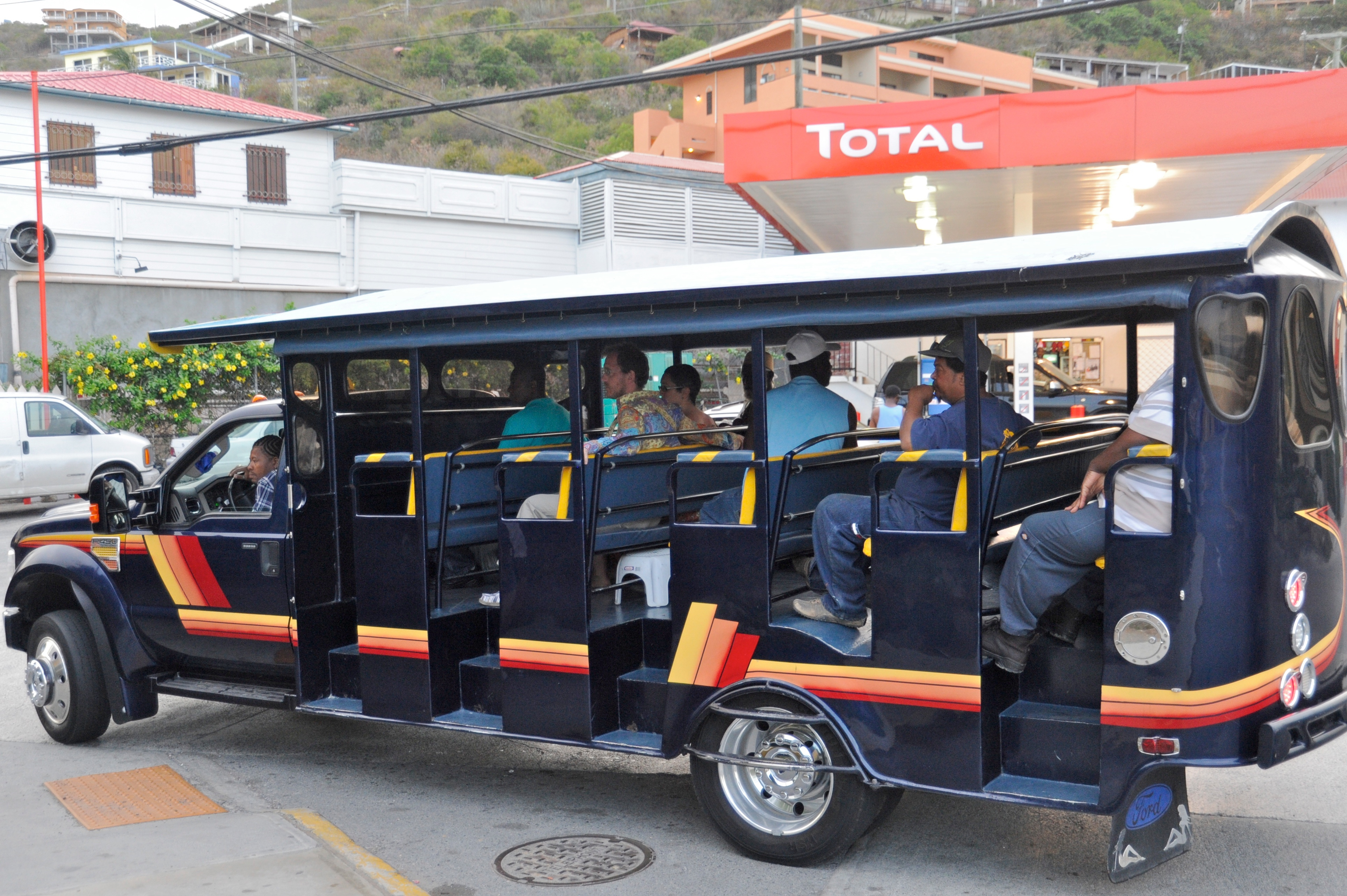
Safaris

"Safaris", as they are called locally, are open air taxis mounted onto the back of a pickup truck. Because VITRAN bus transit is not very efficient, some "safari" drivers operate on several VITRAN bus fixed paths. Some Safari drivers still run on the old VITRAN 101 route.

=== Highways and Major Roads ===
In the USVI, highways and major routes beginning with 3-4 are located on St. Thomas. Many of these highways and routes pass through or border the town of Anna's Retreat. Some of the major highways and roads include:

- Route 32 (VI 32) Connects to Route 38 in Anna's Retreat as Mariendahl Road.
- Highway/Route 38 (VI 38) The Weymouth Rhymer Highway passes through Anna's Retreat, becoming Emile Milo Francis Memorial Dr. which leads to Smith Bay.
- Route 39 (VI 39) Donoe Road, connects to Route 38 to Route 40.
- Route 40 (VI 40) Donoe Road Bypass, connects to Route 42 to Route 39 and continues through the mountains and into Charlotte Amalie.
- Route 42 (VI 42) Mandal Road, connects to Route 38.

== See also ==
- Charlotte Amalie West
- Cruz Bay
