= Virgin Islands Transit =

Public transit system in the United States Virgin Islands

VITRAN
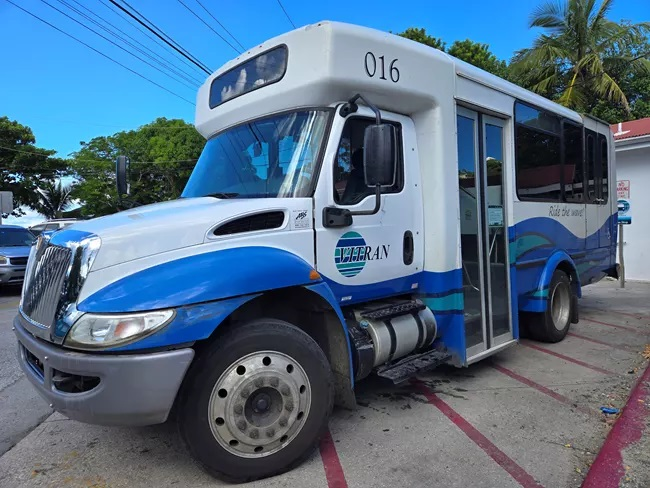
- Smaller VITRAN Bus
- Parent: United States Virgin Islands Department of Public Works
- Founded: 1995
- Headquarters: 8244 Sub Base, Charlotte Amalie, VI 00802
- Locale: United States Virgin Islands
- Service area: St. Croix, St. John, and St. Thomas
- Service type: Transit bus; Paratransit; Ferry
- Routes: Bus:9; Ferry: 2
- Hubs: 3
- Annual ridership: 269,868 (2024 transit bus and paratransit only)
- Operator: United States Virgin Islands Department of Public Works (transit bus and paratransit only), Varlack Ventures and Transportation Services (ferry)
- Website: https://dpw.vi.gov/about-vitran/

The Virgin Island Public Transit (VITRAN) system is a comprehensive public transportation system serving the United States Virgin Islands. The system encompasses various modes of transportation, including fixed-route buses, paratransit services and ferries is operated by the United States Virgin Islands' Department of Public Works (fixed-route buses and paratransit services) and Varlack Ventures and Transportation Services (ferry). VITRAN vehicles and ferries operate on 9 fixed-route transit bus routes, dial-a-ride paratransit service, and 2 ferry routes.

According to a document from the Department of Public Works published in 2024, ridership for the fixed path transit and paratransit buses was reported to be 269,868 in 2024. No ridership ferry data was collected by VITRAN or the Department of Public Works since they do not operate the ferry services. In 2023, the Department of Planning and Natural Resources reported that the ridership of the fixed path transit and paratransit buses was four times higher on the island of St. Thomas than on St. Croix and St. John.

== History ==
Manassah Bus Line was the predecessor to VITRAN. It was a private operator of public bus service in the island of St. Thomas first and much later on St. Croix before the government took over and established VITRAN. Manassah Francis was a pioneer in transportation in the U.S. Virgin Islands and founded Manassah Bus Lines, which ran for over 50 years. He was granted the first public bus transportation franchise in St. Thomas in 1951.

The government took over operations from Manassah Bus Co. in 1995, at which point it became known as VITRAN and was expanded the service to all three major islands.

== Fixed-Path Transit Bus Routes ==
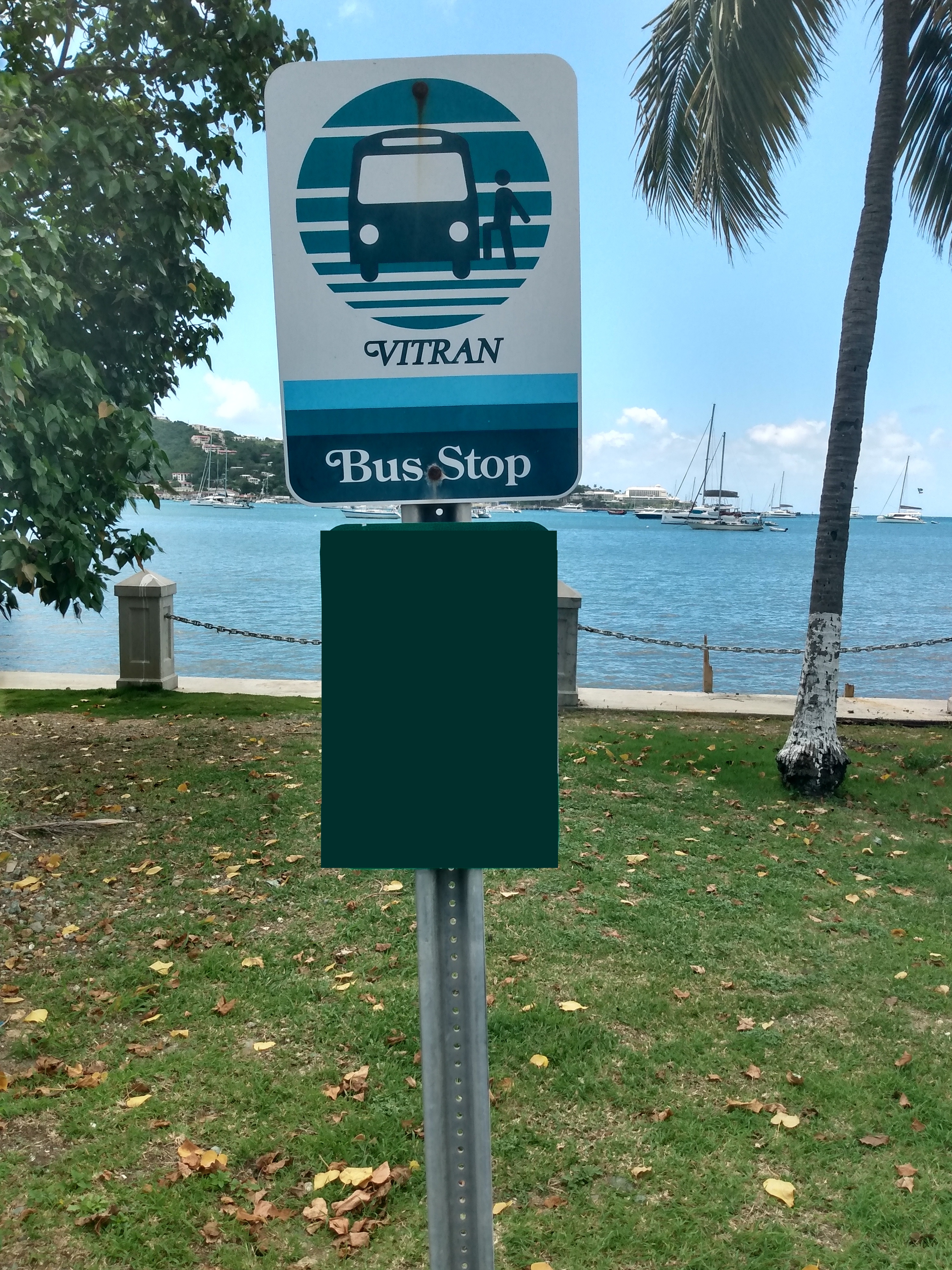
VITRAN bus stop sign

St. Croix (Currently 3 unique routes)

- 103: Christiansted-Frederiksted
- 302: La Reine Terminal-Tide Village
- 502: Sunshine Mall-La Reine Terminal

St. John (Currently 1 unique route)

- 101: Cruz Bay to Salt Pond (Coral Bay)
- 107: Adrian to Chocolate Hole [suspended]

St. Thomas (Currently 5 unique routes)

- 101: City/UVI [suspended]
- 102: City/Subbase/Airport [suspended]
- 201: Bordeaux
- 301: Donoe/Hidden Valley
- 401: Red Hook via Smith Bay
- 501: Bovoni via Tutu Park Mall
- 601: Old & New Tutu via Tutu Park Mall

== Paratransit Service ==
The paratransit service provided by VITRAN, VITRAN Plus, is a specialized transportation system designed to serve individuals with disabilities who cannot access the regular fixed path transit services. This service adheres to the guidelines of the Americans with Disabilities Act (ADA), ensuring accessible transportation for elderly, those with mobility issues and disabled residents and visitors. VITRAN Plus includes door-to-door or curb-to-curb transport and advanced reservation systems at half the price of the fixed path transist.

In 2020, the Virgin Islands Department of Public Works implemented Routematch software to enhance the efficiency of VITRAN Plus. The system enables real-time tracking of vehicles, streamlined scheduling, and improved communication between drivers and dispatch. Designed to improve service reliability and accountability, Routematch supports VITRAN's broader efforts to modernize its transportation offerings for seniors and individuals with disabilities.

== Ferry Routes ==
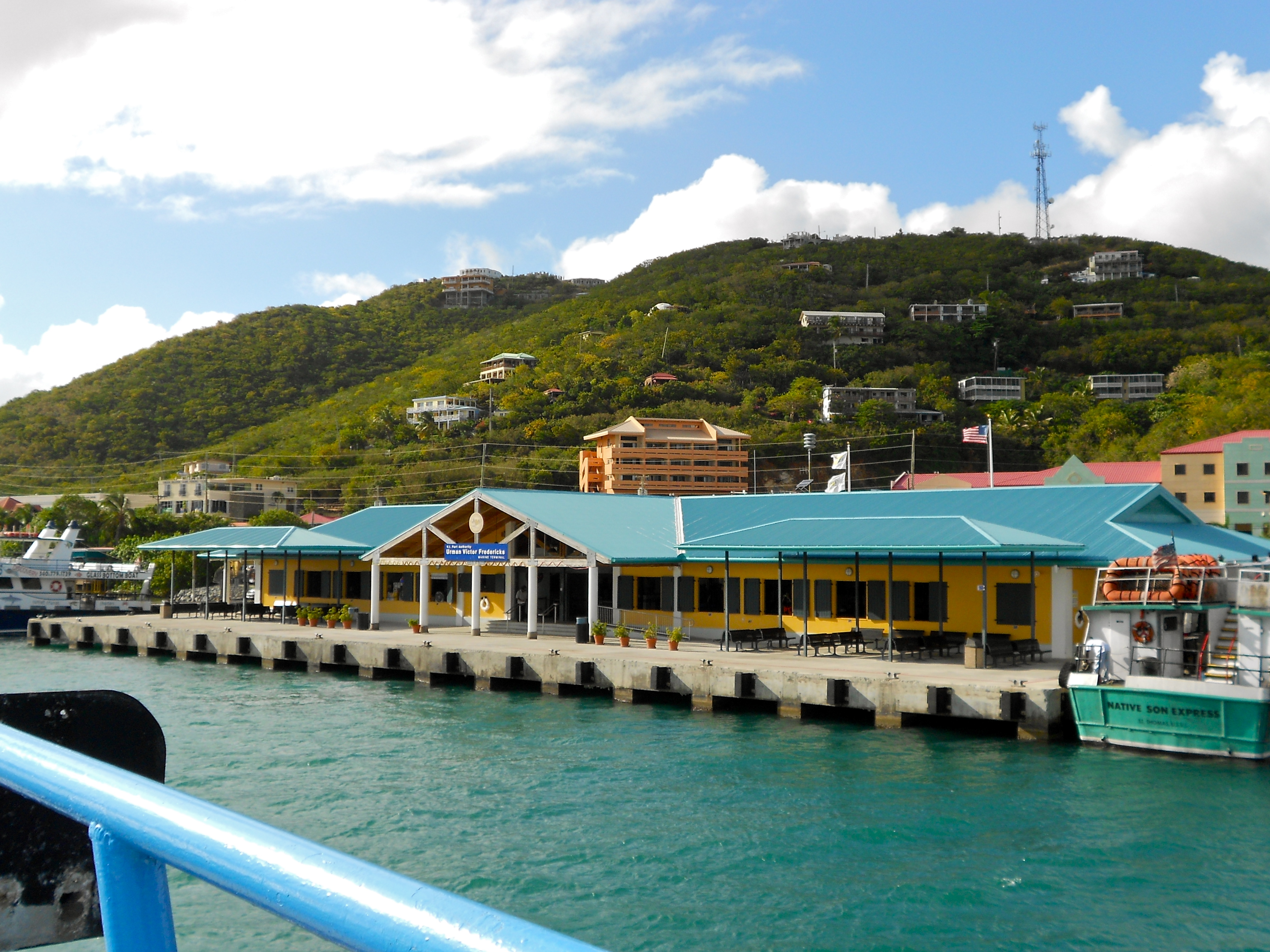
Urman Victor Fredericks Marine Terminal in Red Hook, St. Thomas

VITRAN integrated ferry services into its operations in 2014. This expansion was marked by the introduction of two VITRAN-branded ferries, enhancing transportation between St. Thomas and St. John. Although these ferries were dedicated in late 2013, operational delays postponed their launch until the following year.

There are currently 3 ferries operating between St. Thomas and St. John:

- Cruz Bay 1 (maximum capacity 204)
- Red Hook 1 (maximum capacity 204)
- Spirit of 1733 (maximum capacity 300)

=== Current Routes ===
- Red Hook, St. Thomas - Cruz Bay, St. John
- Charlotte Amalie, St. Thomas - Cruz Bay, St. John (seasonal)

=== Future Route ===
- Charlotte Amalie, St. Thomas - Christiansted, St. Croix

The Loredon Lorence Boynes Sr. Marine Terminal in Cruz Bay, St. John, the Urman Victor Fredericks Marine Terminal in Red Hook, St. Thomas and Edward William Blyden Ferry Terminal in Charlotte Amalie, St. Thomas, serve as key multimodal transportation hubs for VITRAN. At all three locations, passengers can move between VITRAN ferry services and VITRAN bus routes. Although these terminals are important points in the VITRAN system, they are not operated by VITRAN or the Department of Public Works; rather, they are managed by the Virgin Islands Port Authority, which oversees marine transportation infrastructure across the territory.

== Fleet ==
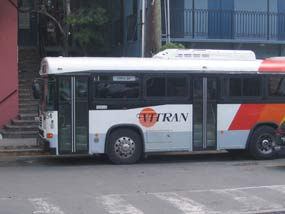
Larger VITRAN bus with old logo.

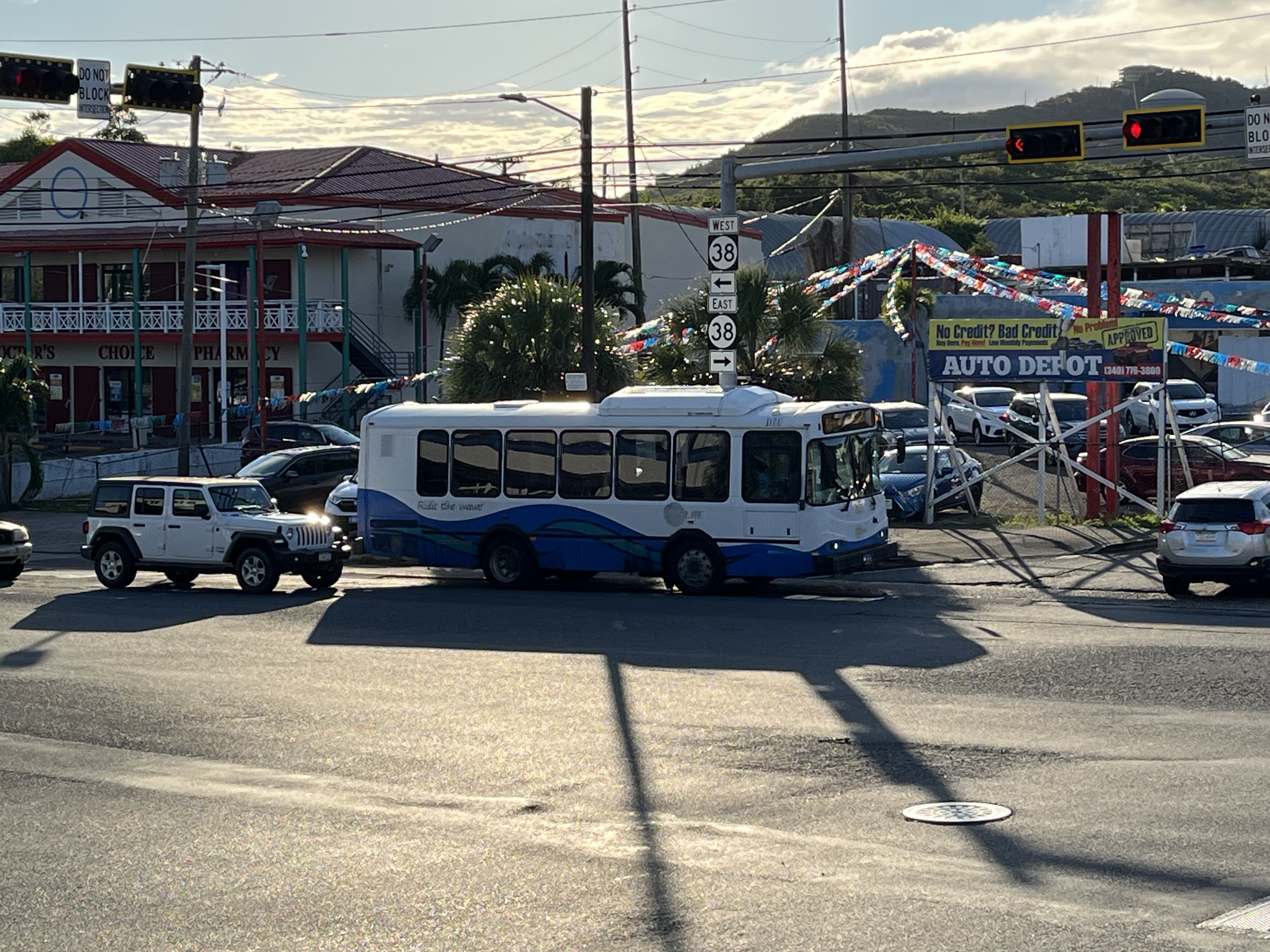
Larger VITRAN bus with new logo.

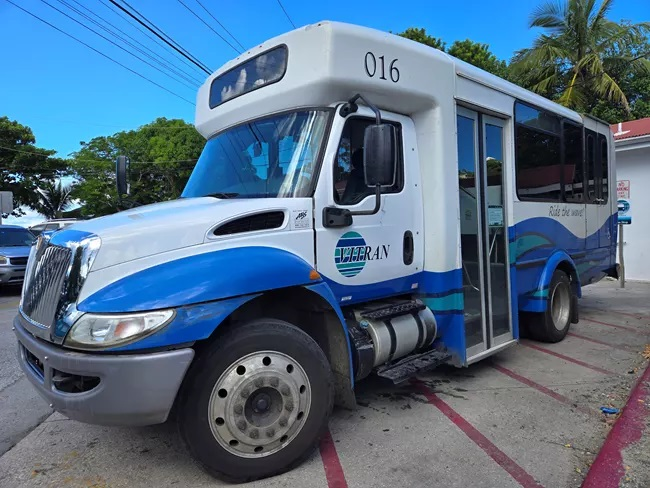
Smaller VITRAN bus typically used in hill and mountain terrain.

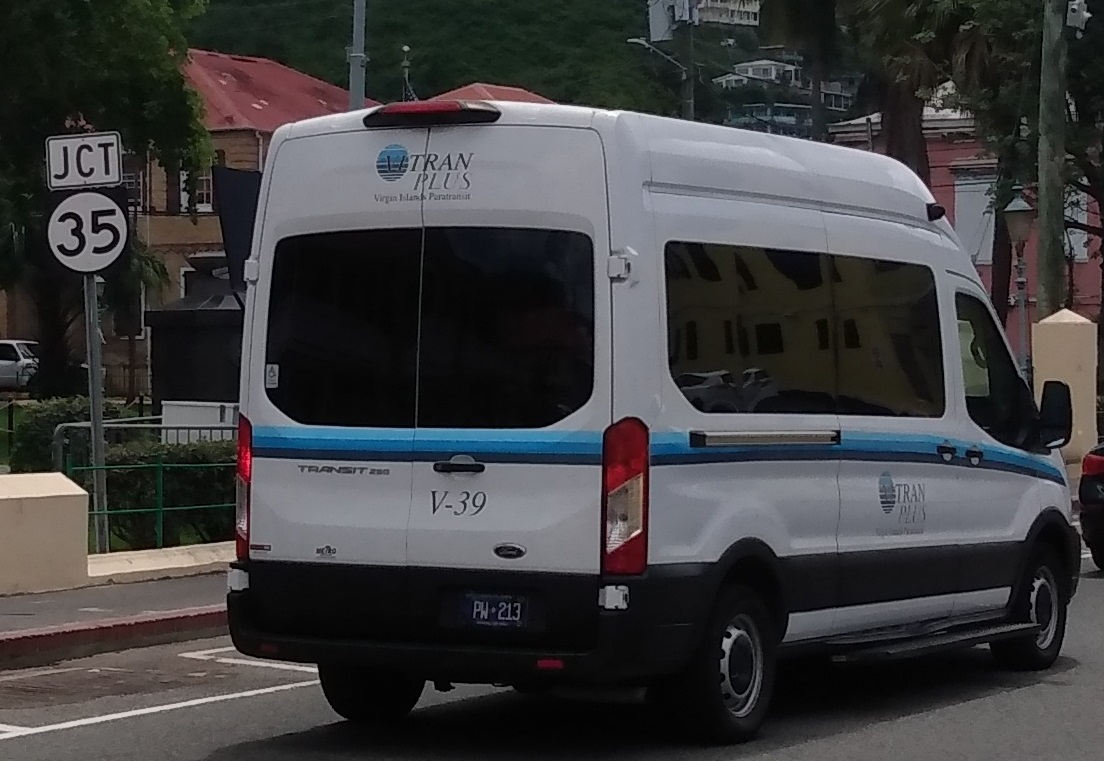
VITRAN Plus Paratransit bus.

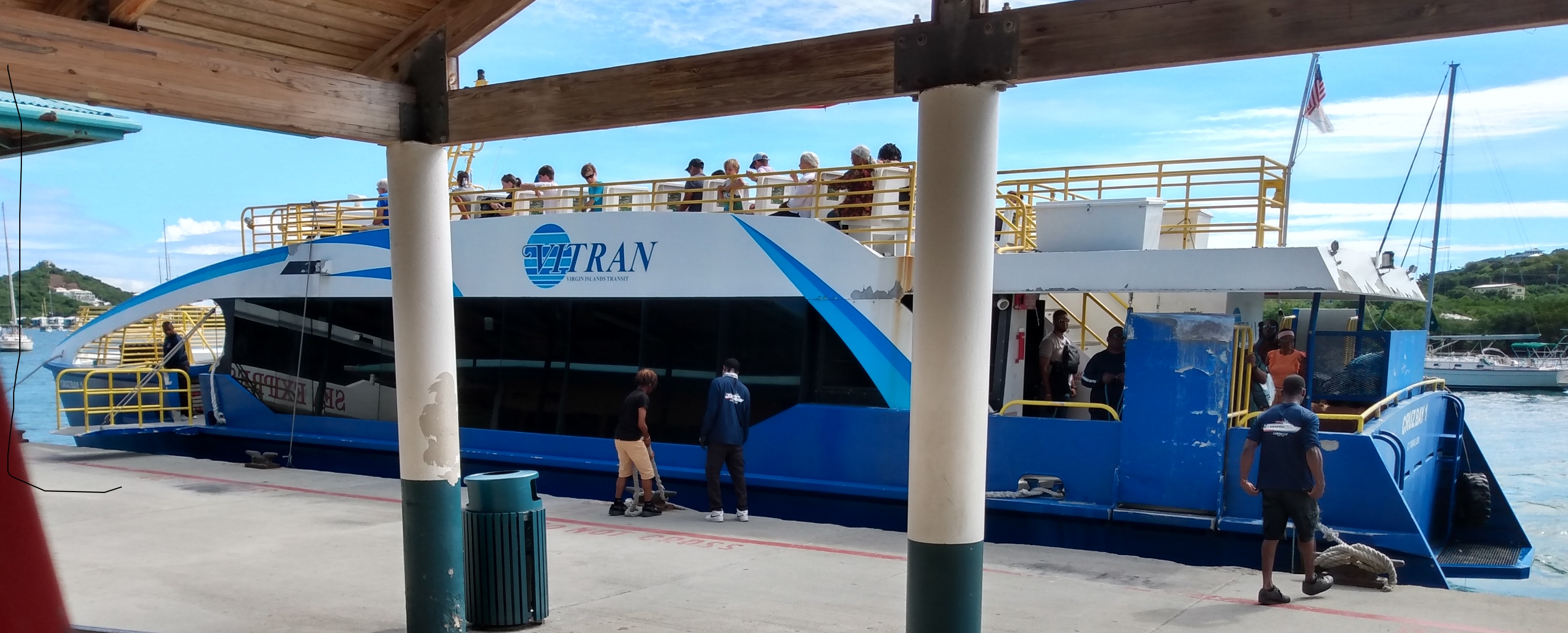
VITRAN ferry docking at the Urman Victor Fredericks Marine Terminal in Red Hook, St. Thomas.
