= East End, Saint Thomas, U.S. Virgin Islands =

District of St. Thomas, US Virgin Islands

East End Østende (Danish)
- Subdistrict
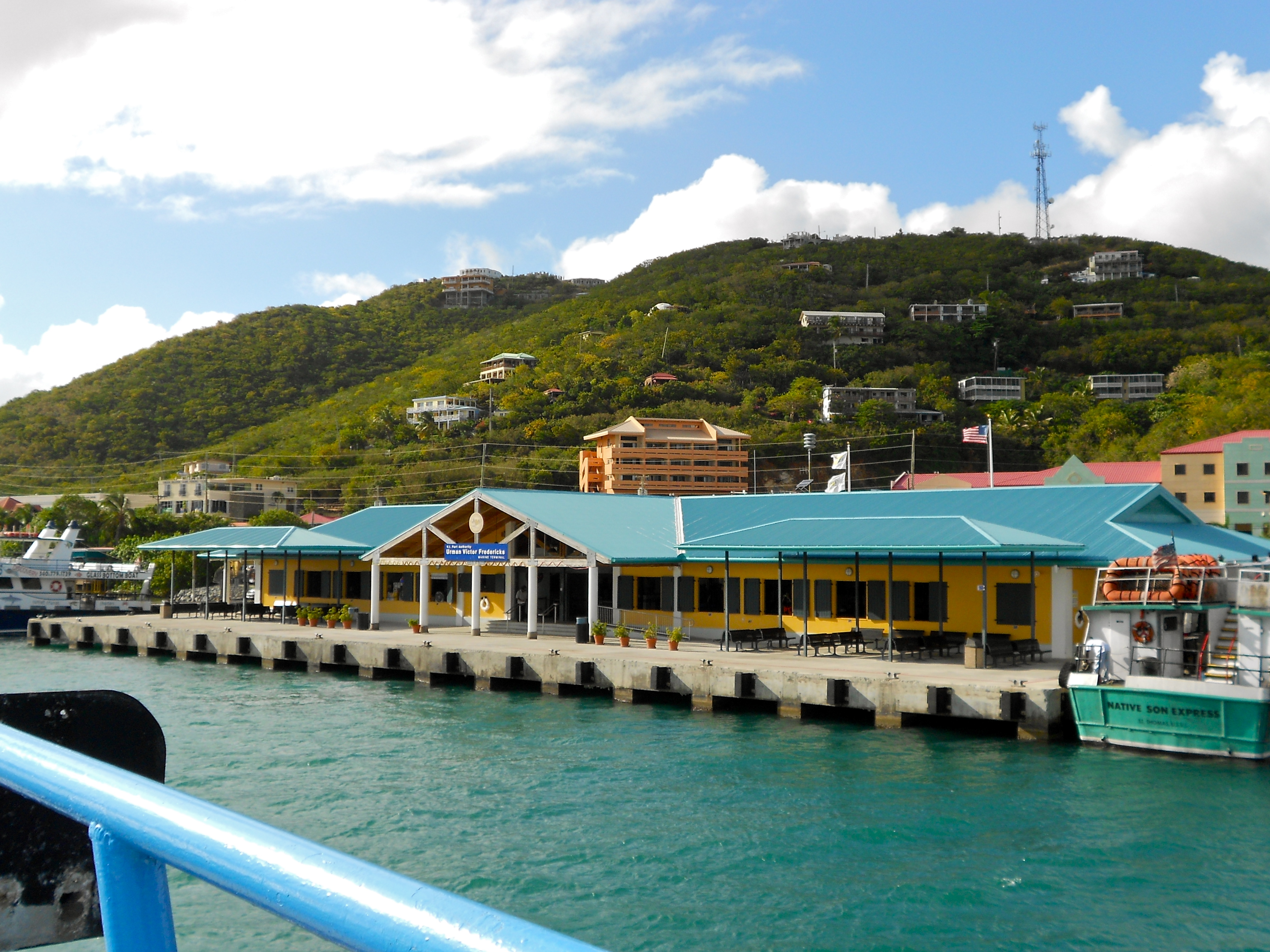
- The ferry port in Red Hook

- Location within the United States Virgin Islands
- Coordinates: 18°19′N 64°51′W
- Country: United States
- Territory: U.S. Virgin Islands
- District: Saint Thomas

Area
  - Total: 5.26 sq mi (13.6 km^{2})

Population (2020)
  - Total: 7,501
  - Density: 1,430/sq mi (551/km^{2})
- ZIP code: 00802

East End is nr. 2 of St. Thomas

East End (Danish: Østende) is an administrative subdistrict of the island of St. Thomas in the United States Virgin Islands. The largest community is Red Hook, while smaller communities include Benner, Nazareth, Nadir, Frydendal, and Smith Bay. The subdistrict includes the offshore islands of Great Saint James, Little Saint James, Bovoni Cay, Patricia Cay, Cas Cay, Rotto Cay, Thatch Cay, Shark Island, and Dog Island.

The East End subdistrict lost 901 residents between the 2010 U.S. census and the 2020 U.S. census, with a 2020 population of 7,502.

The East End region offers a more secluded character and less population density than the Charlotte Amalie, Southside, and Tutu subdistricts. East End is home to many of the islands' largest resorts, in addition to many shopping areas and entertainment venues, as well as the Coral World Marine Park & Underwater Observatory in Coki Point, which is the most popular tourist attraction on St. Thomas.

East End is located about 7.4 miles (11.9 km) east of the territorial capital of Charlotte Amalie, which is approximately a 30-minute drive on the windy, small, and narrow St. Thomas roads. There are buses and taxis leaving East End. A typical fare for a taxi drive to the capital is $20.

While hotels on St. Thomas are evenly divided between Charlotte Amalie and East End, the latter hosts more resort-style hotels with access to the beachfront. East End resorts are therefore generally more expensive than those found elsewhere on the island. Lindquist and Sapphire Beaches are two famous beaches in the subdistrict; others include Pineapple Beach (Renaissance Beach) and Vessup Beach.

The 20-minute ferry ride to Cruz Bay on the island of St. John, which is a part of the Virgin Islands National Park, leaves the town of Red Hook. Other ferry destinations from Red Hook include the islands of Tortola and Virgin Gorda in the British Virgin Islands, as well as St. Croix.

== Places of interest ==
- The 4.5-acre Coral World Marine Park & Underwater Observatory at Coki Point is the most popular tourist attraction of St. Thomas and takes you to coral reefs 15 feet (5 m) under the ocean surface. There are wild iguanas and native wildlife, in addition to a sea turtle pool, shark tank, marine lagoon, and gardens.
- American Yacht Harbor: Waterfront shopping area with bars and restaurants in Red Hook. The Red Hook Plaza and Red Hook Shopping Mall are additional areas with retail stores for shopping.
- The Color of Joy: An art gallery in Red Hook offering local-made arts and crafts.
- Marina Market: an outdoor market across from the Red Hook ferry terminal that serves fresh fish, meat, and other fresh foods.
