= Red Hook, U.S. Virgin Islands =

Red Hook
- Census-Designated Place
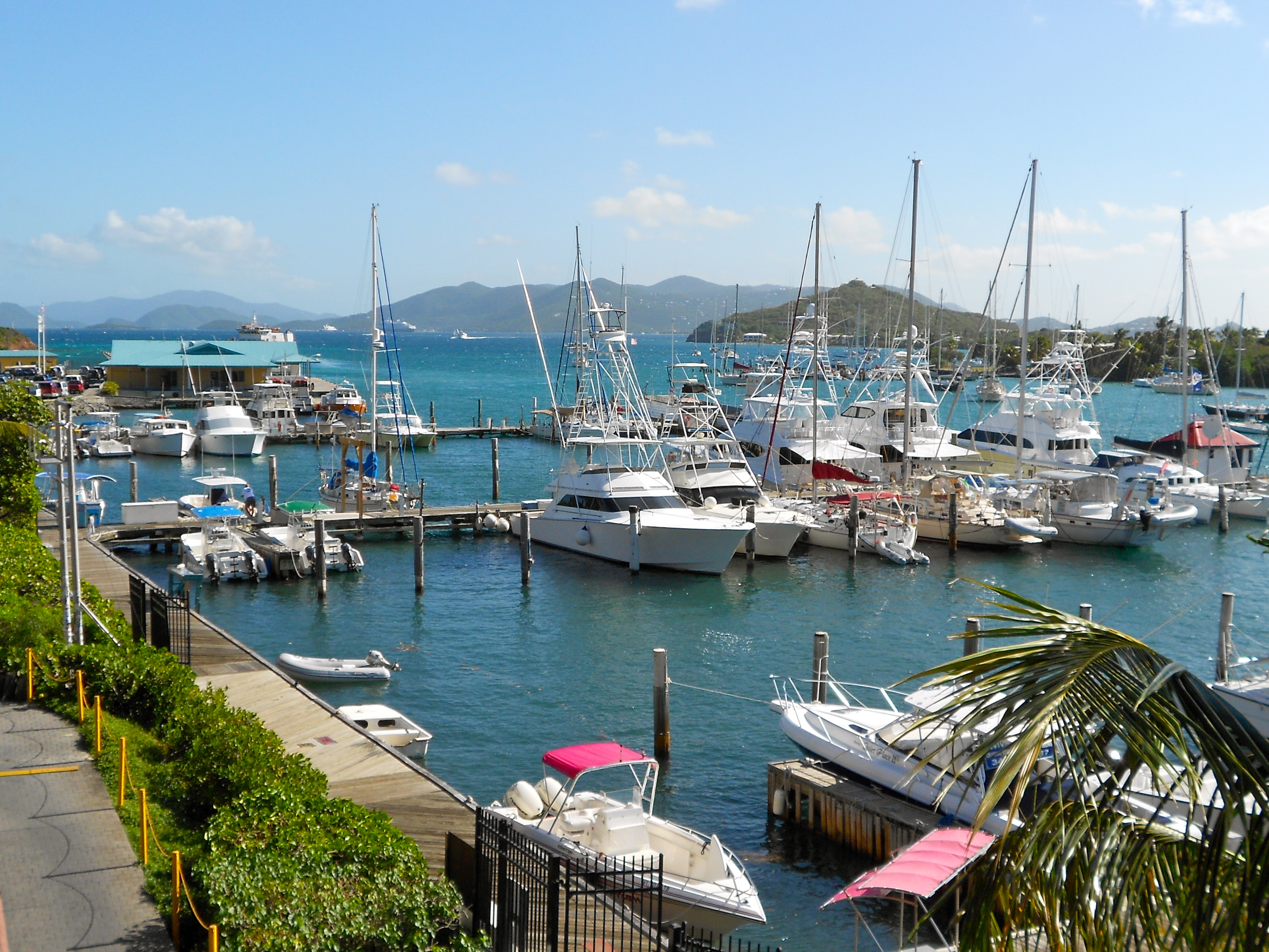

- Location within the United States Virgin Islands
- Coordinates: 18°19′36″N 64°51′01″W
- Country: United States
- Territory: U.S. Virgin Islands
- District: Saint Thomas-Saint John
- Island: Saint Thomas
- Subdistrict(s): East End

Population (2020)
  - Total: 225
- ZIP code: 00802, 00805
- Area code: 340

St. Thomas, Subdistricts, towns, and CDPs

Red Hook is a suburban port census-designated place (CDP) located on the east side of Saint Thomas in the East End subdistrict. It is the least populated town or CDP in the Virgin Islands with a population of 225 according to the 2020 Census. This east end CDP features an unofficial "town" of red-tiled roof homes and businesses dotting a rolling coastline that overlooks Pillsbury Sound and the island of St. John. Red Hook hosts several hotels, marinas, a busy port, and other key items of the east side of St. Thomas (East End (pop. 7,672)).

== Demographics ==
=== 2020 census ===
Red Hook CDP, U.S. Virgin Islands – Racial and ethnic composition Note: the US Census treats Hispanic/Latino as an ethnic category. This table excludes Latinos from the racial categories and assigns them to a separate category. Hispanics/Latinos may be of any race.
Race / Ethnicity (NH = Non-Hispanic)	Pop 2020	% 2020
White alone (NH)	130	57.78%
Black or African American alone (NH)	49	21.78%
Native American or Alaska Native alone (NH)	0	0.00%
Asian alone (NH)	3	1.33%
Native Hawaiian or Pacific Islander alone (NH)	0	0.00%
Other race alone (NH)	0	0.00%
Mixed race or Multiracial (NH)	15	6.67%
Hispanic or Latino (any race)	28	12.44%
Total	225	100.00%

== Education ==
The Ivanna Eudora Kean High School is the only public or private school in Red Hook. It is a part of the St. Thomas-St. John School District. It is only one of two public high schools on the island of St. Thomas. The high school currently serves as the public high school for the eastern part of the island of St. Thomas and the island of St. John USVI.

== Transportation ==
Red Hook is a port CDP. The CDP is primarily made up of facilities to service the yachting community. Red Hook contains a ferry terminal, car ferry dock, a marina village and multiple shopping, dining, and entertainment options.

=== Ferry terminal ===
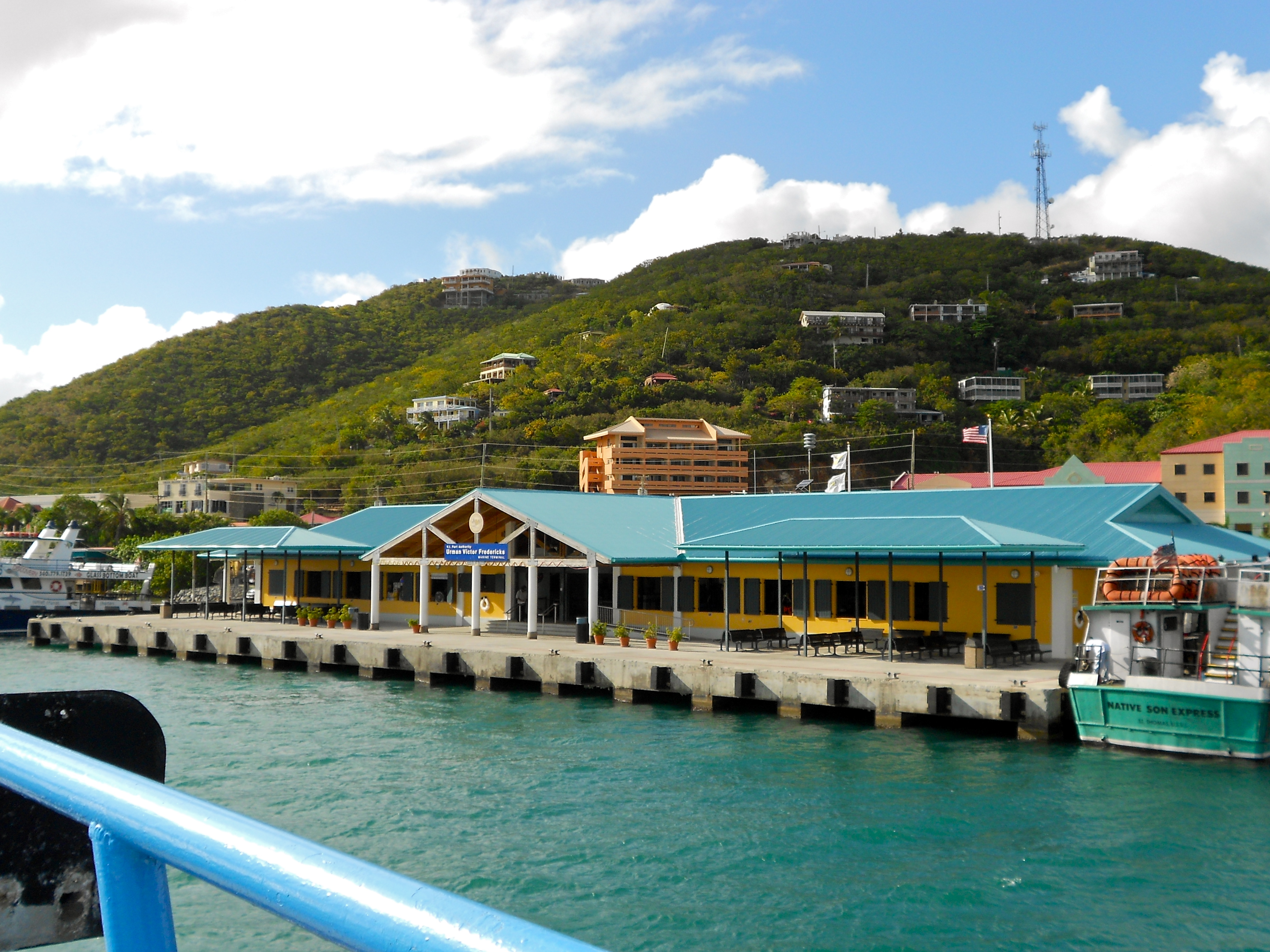
Urman Victor Fredericks Marine Terminal

The Urman Victor Fredericks Marine Terminal serves as the only ferry terminal to surrounding islands from the CDP of Red Hook. From the terminal nonstop service to Cruz Bay, St. John and Tortola in the British Virgin Islands.

The Noel "Breeze" Boynes Sr. Car Ferry Dock, located at the Urman V. Fredericks Marine Facility in Red Hook, is named in honor of Captain Noel "Breeze" Boynes Sr. This dock is primarily utilized by barge companies that operate daily scheduled services, transporting cargo and vehicles between St. Thomas and St. John.

=== Public transportation ===
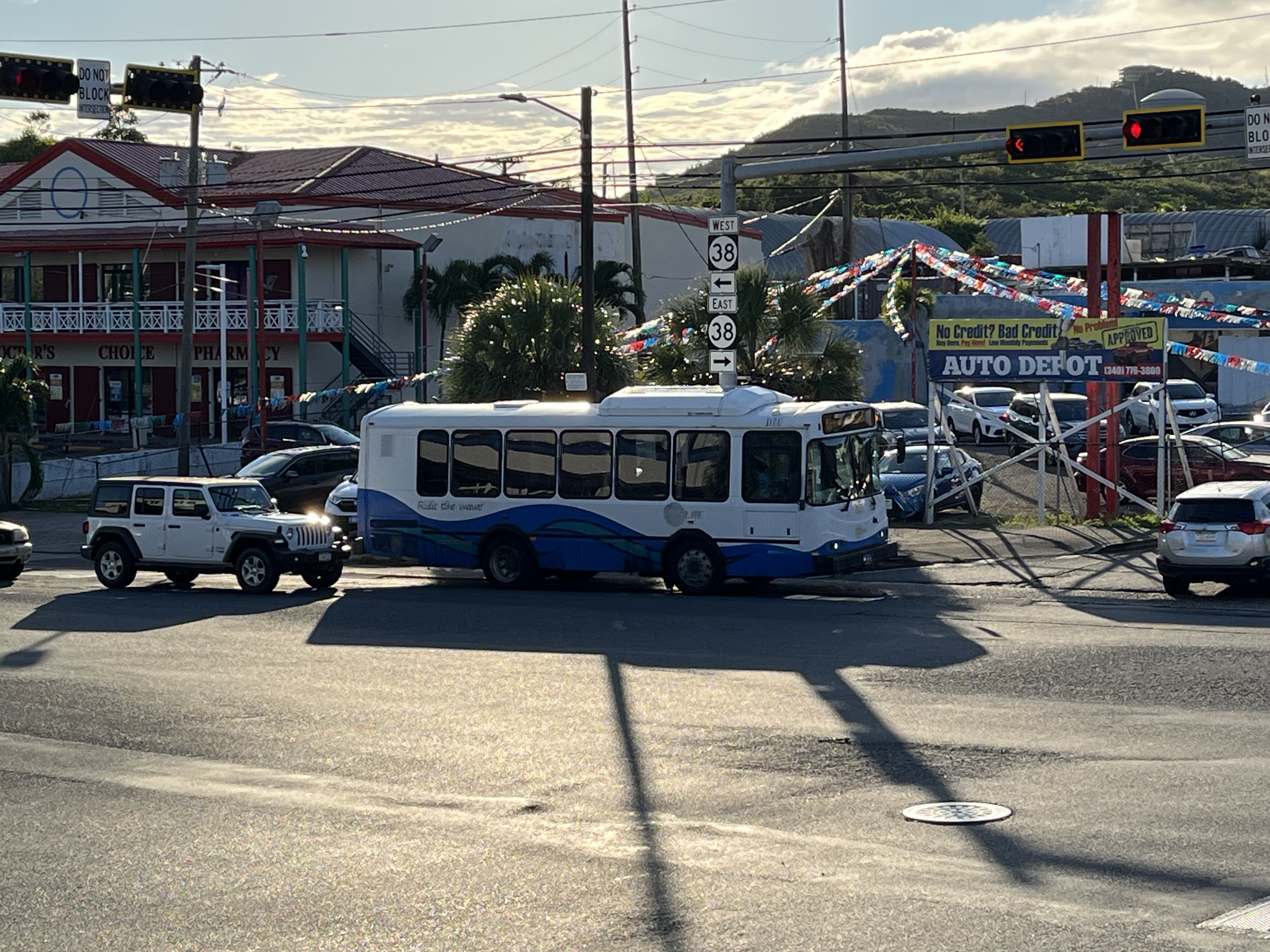
VITRAN bus on St Thomas near TuTu Park Mall.

The VITRAN (Virgin Island Public Transit) system is a comprehensive public transportation system serving the U.S. Virgin Islands. It provides accessible public transportation across the major islands of St. Croix, St. John, and St. Thomas. The system encompasses various modes of transportation, including buses, paratransit services, and ferries connecting major towns, tourist destinations, transportation hubs, and islands.

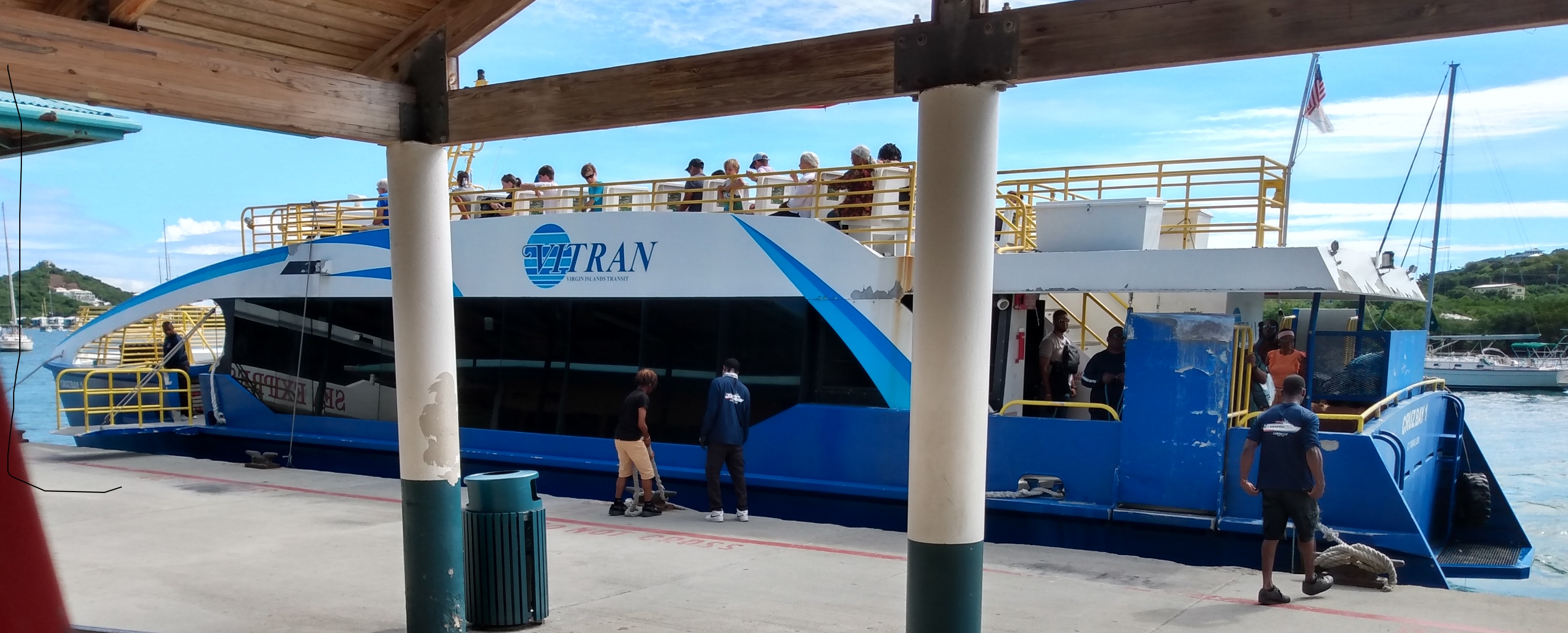
VITRAN Ferry, Cruz Bay 1, docking at the Urman Victor Fredericks Marine Terminal in Red Hook, St. Thomas

The VITRAN ferry service operates only from Red Hook on St. Thomas connecting the public to Cruz Bay.

=== Highways and major roads ===
In the USVI, highways and major routes beginning with 3-4 are located on St. Thomas. A few of these highways and routes pass through or border the CDP of Charlotte Amalie East. Some of the major highways and roads include:

- Highway 32 (VI 32) connects to VI 38 and passes through Red Hook as Red Hook Road (or Emile Milo Francis Memorial Dr.).
- Route 38 (VI 38) connects to VI 32.
- Route 322 (VI 322) Nazareth Road connecting route 32.
