= Tutu Plantation House =

- U.S. National Register of Historic Places
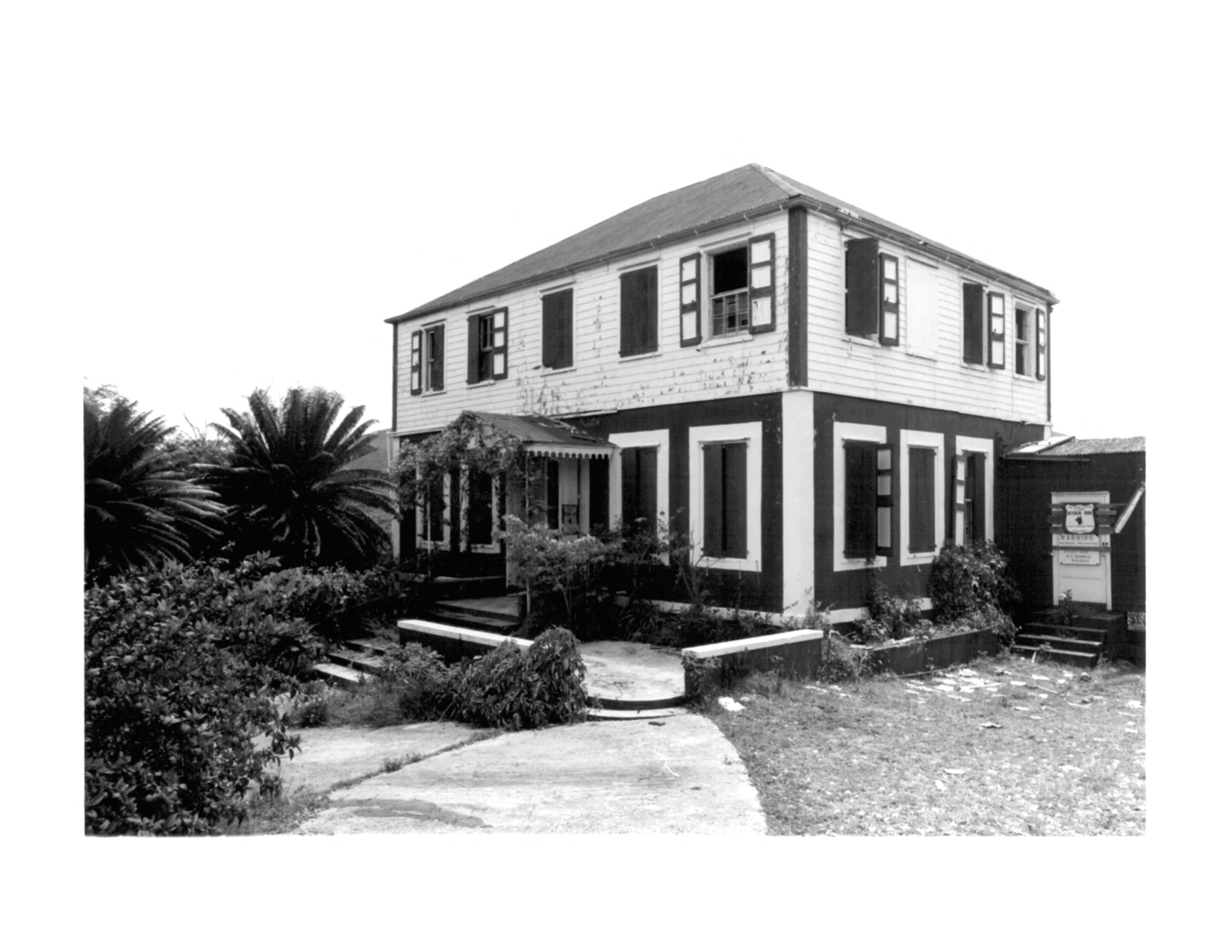

- Location within the U.S. Virgin Islands
- Location: 3 miles (4.8 km) northeast of Charlotte Amalie, Virgin Islands
- Coordinates: 18°20′23″N 64°53′09″W
- Area: 1 acre (0.40 ha)
- Built: c. 1803
- NRHP reference No.: 76001867
- Added to NRHP: July 12, 1976

Tutu Plantation House in the Tutu subdistrict of St. Thomas, U.S. Virgin Islands, was built in 1813. It was listed on the National Register of Historic Places in 1976. The listing included two contributing buildings and equipment for processing sugar.

It was deemed significant as one of few plantation greathouses surviving on St. Thomas. It is a two-story 40 by 32 feet (12.2 m × 9.8 m) building with a hipped roof. Its interior has Greek Revival trim dating from 20 to 30 years after the house's construction, which was perhaps in about 1803.

The word tutu, in Danish, means a trumpet-like conch shell which was used to call the slaves to work.
