= Benner, U.S. Virgin Islands =

Coordinates: 18°19′20″N 64°51′43″W

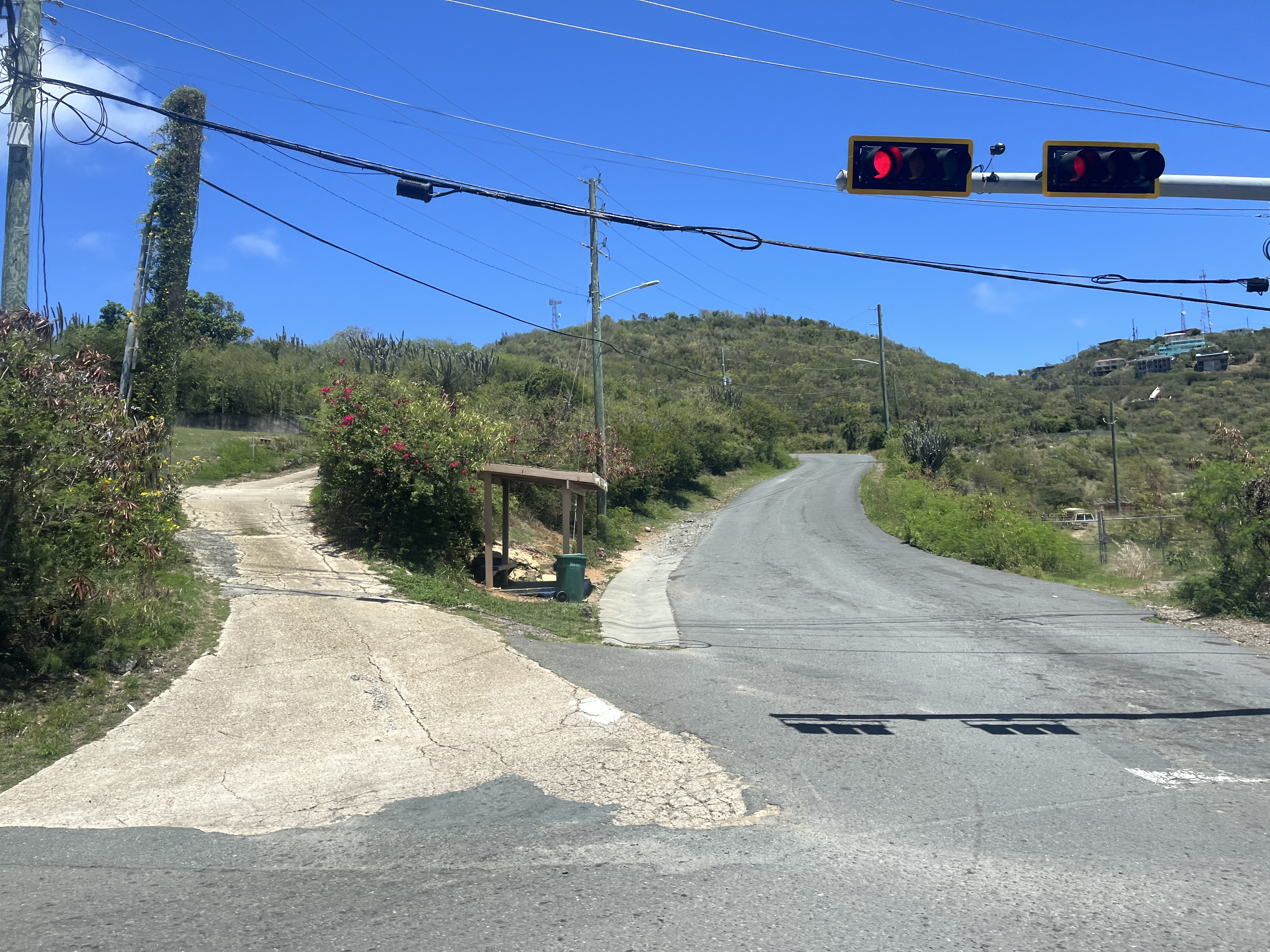
Benner

Benner is a settlement on the island of Saint Thomas in the United States Virgin Islands.
