= Southside, Saint Thomas, U.S. Virgin Islands =

Southside Sydside (Danish)
- Subdistrict
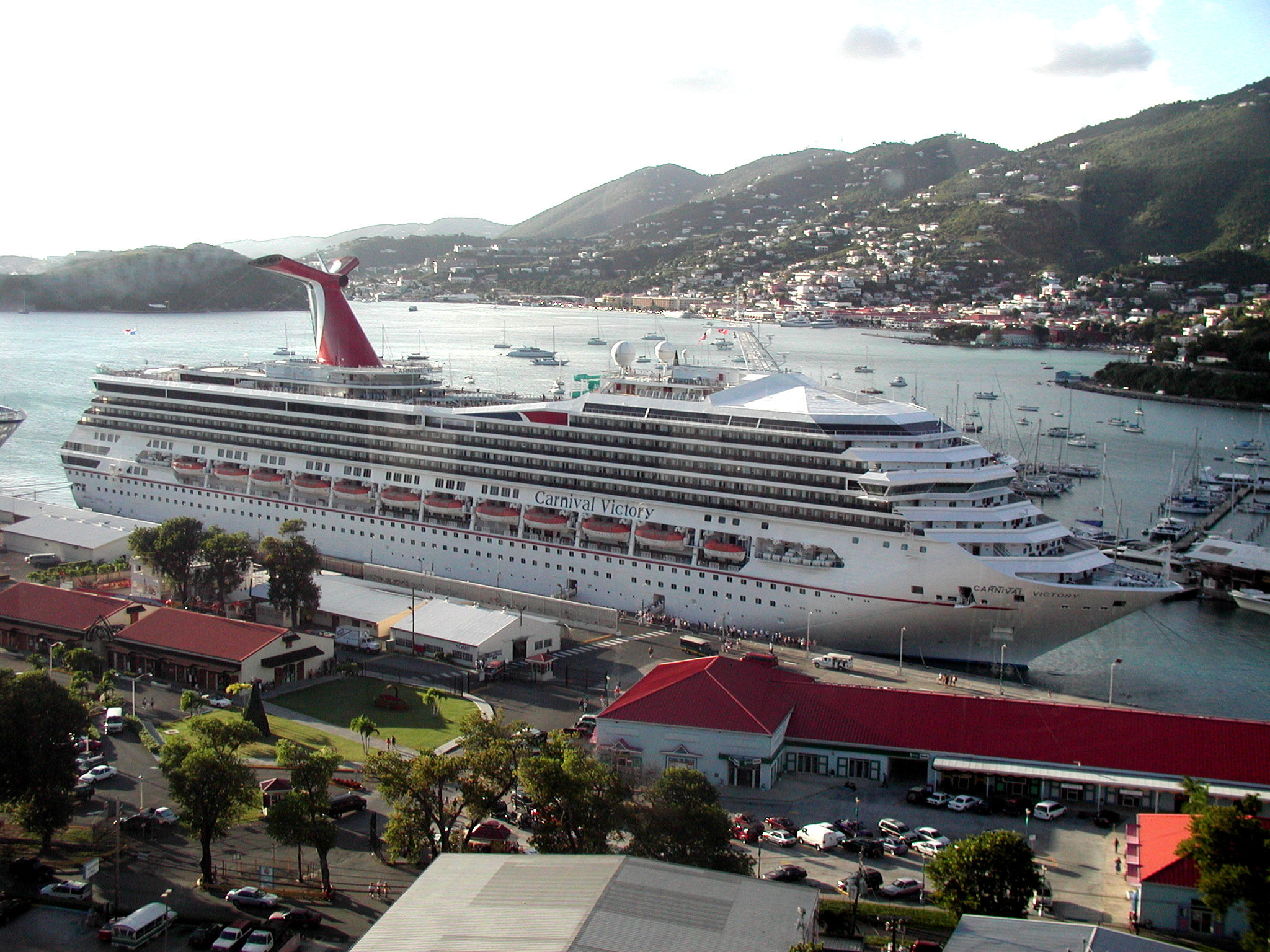
- Havensight is the busiest cruise ship port in the world.

- Location within the United States Virgin Islands
- Coordinates: 18°19′N 64°53′W
- Country: United States
- Territory: U.S. Virgin Islands
- District: Saint Thomas

Population (2010)
  - Total: 5,411

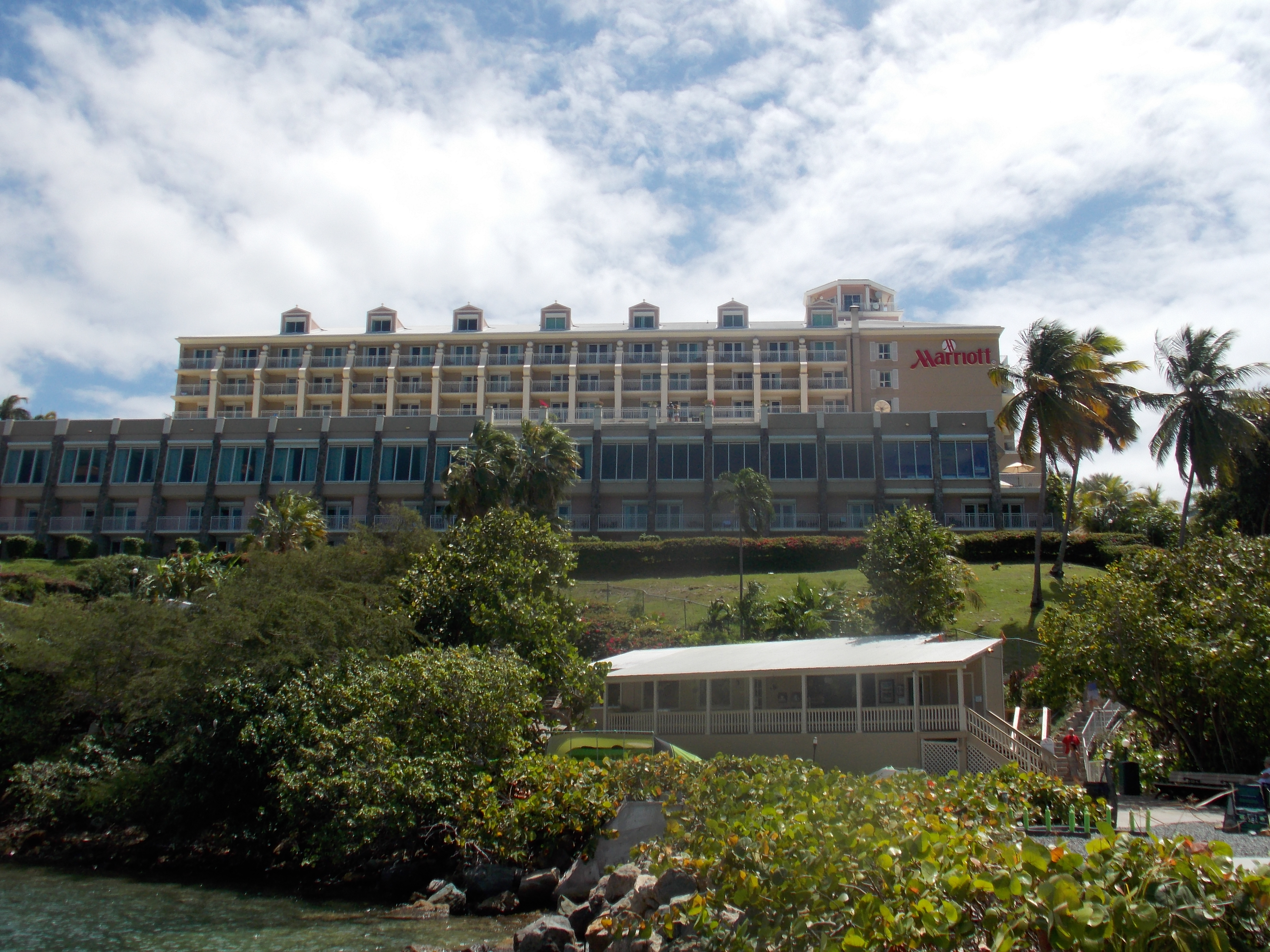
Marriott Frenchman's Reef Resort

Southside (Danish: Sydside) is a census subdistrict (CSD) on Saint Thomas in the United States Virgin Islands. The CSD borders Charlotte Amalie from Havensight in the west, Nordside- and the Tutu subdistricts to the north, and the East End subdistrict to the east. The 2010 U.S. census showed a population of 5,411 people, which is a decrease of 56 people as compared to the 2000 U.S. census of 5,467. Some communities in the CSD are Havensight, Bellevue, Raphune, Hoffman, Bolongo and Bovoni.

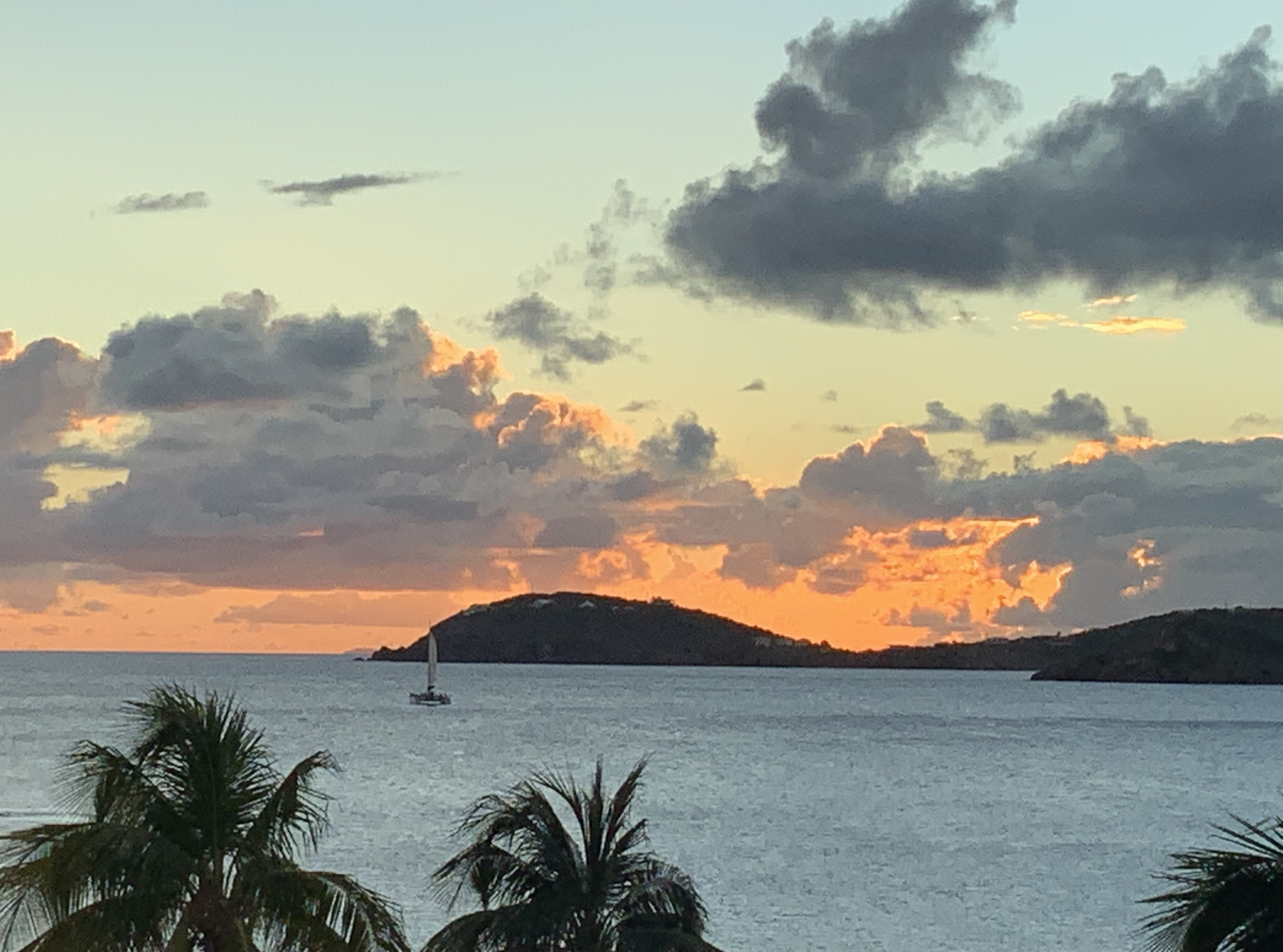
View from Frenchman's Cove Sunset Beach, St Thomas Island
