= Anna's Hope Village =

Place in United States Virgin Islands, United States

Anna's Hope Village Annashåb Landsby (Danish)
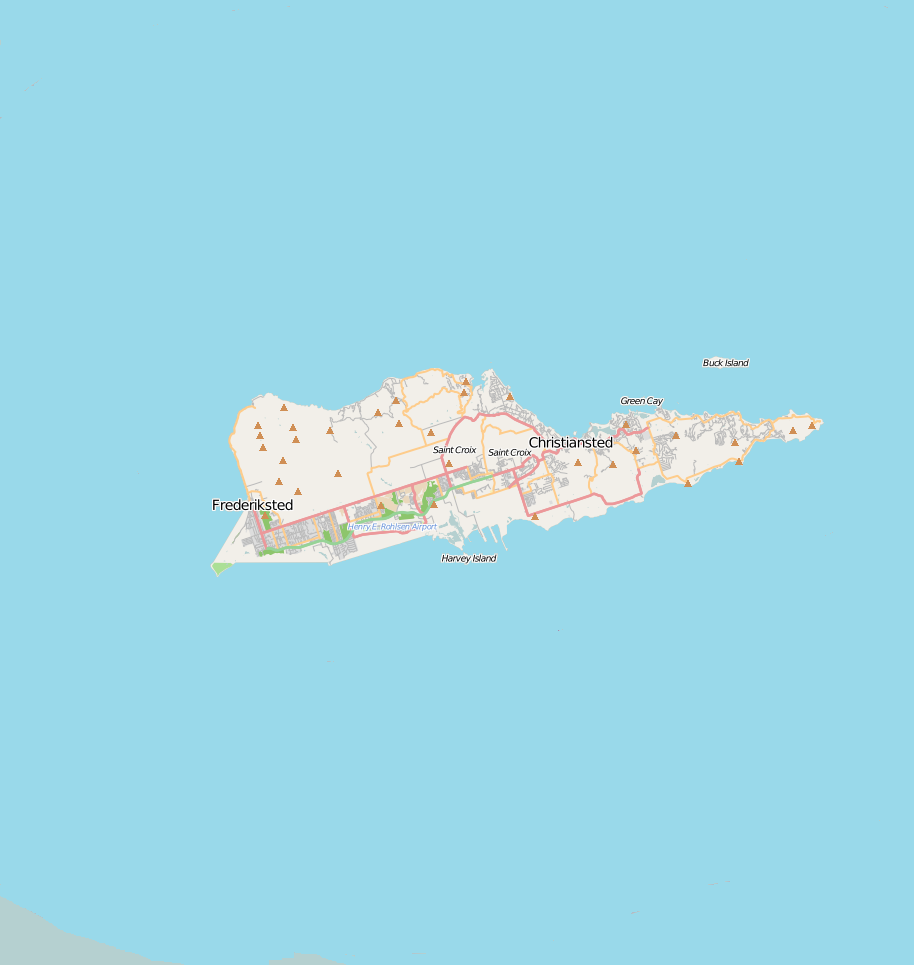
- Location within Saint Croix, US Virgin Islands Location within the U.S. Virgin Islands Location within the Caribbean
- Coordinates: 17.72324°N 64.69974°W
- Sovereign State: United States
- Territory: Virgin Islands
- Island: Saint Croix

Anna's Hope Village (Danish: Annashåb Landsby) is an administrative sub-district of St. Croix, U.S. Virgin Islands.

== History ==
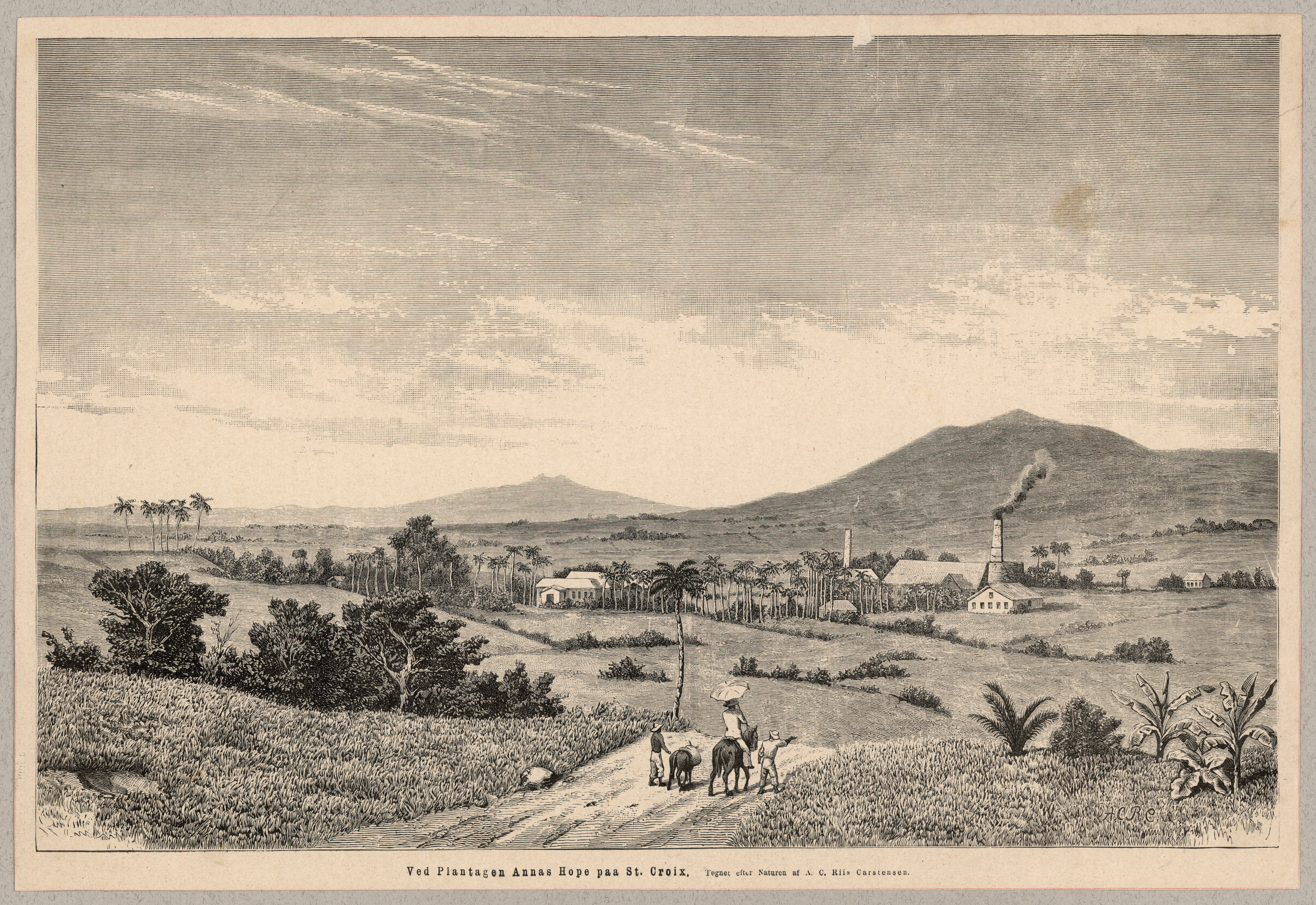
Anna's Hope.

A sugar plantation on the site was formerly known as Robinson's Plantings. In around 1780, it was acquired by Count Bertram Peter de Nully (c. 1719 -1771), the son of Pierre Bertram de Nully from Martinique. The family was originally from the Netherlands to St. Eustace. He would later marry Catharine Heyliger (1721–1799), the daughter of planter and governor of St. Croix Pieter Heyliger. Robinson's Platings was renamed Anna's Hope after their daughter Anna (1747–1785). She was married to Nicholas Cruger. They had three children: Bertram Peter Cruger; Catherine Bard and Elizabeth Cruger.
