= Tutu Park Mall =

Shopping mall in St. Thomas, United States Virgin Islands

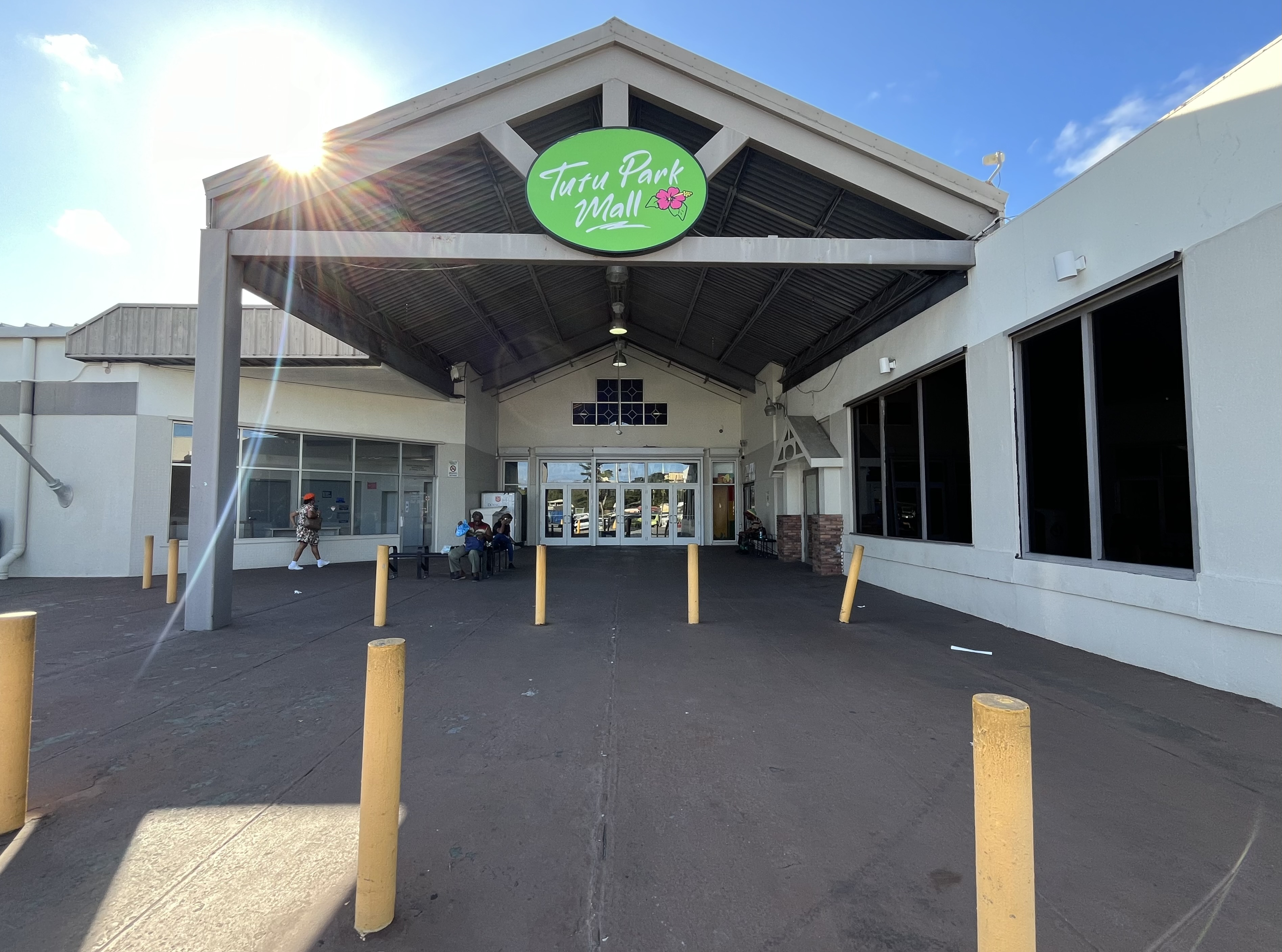
- The entrance to Tutu Park Mall in 2024
- Location: St. Thomas, U.S. Virgin Islands
- Coordinates: 18.3387°N 64.8906°W
- Address: Anna’s Retreat, St. Thomas, U.S. Virgin Islands 00802-1736
- Opened: June 3, 1993; 33 years ago
- Num. of stores: approximately 60
- Num. of anchor tenants: 2 (Kmart and The Market)
- Public transit: VITRAN, VI Taxi
- Website: tutuparkmall.vi

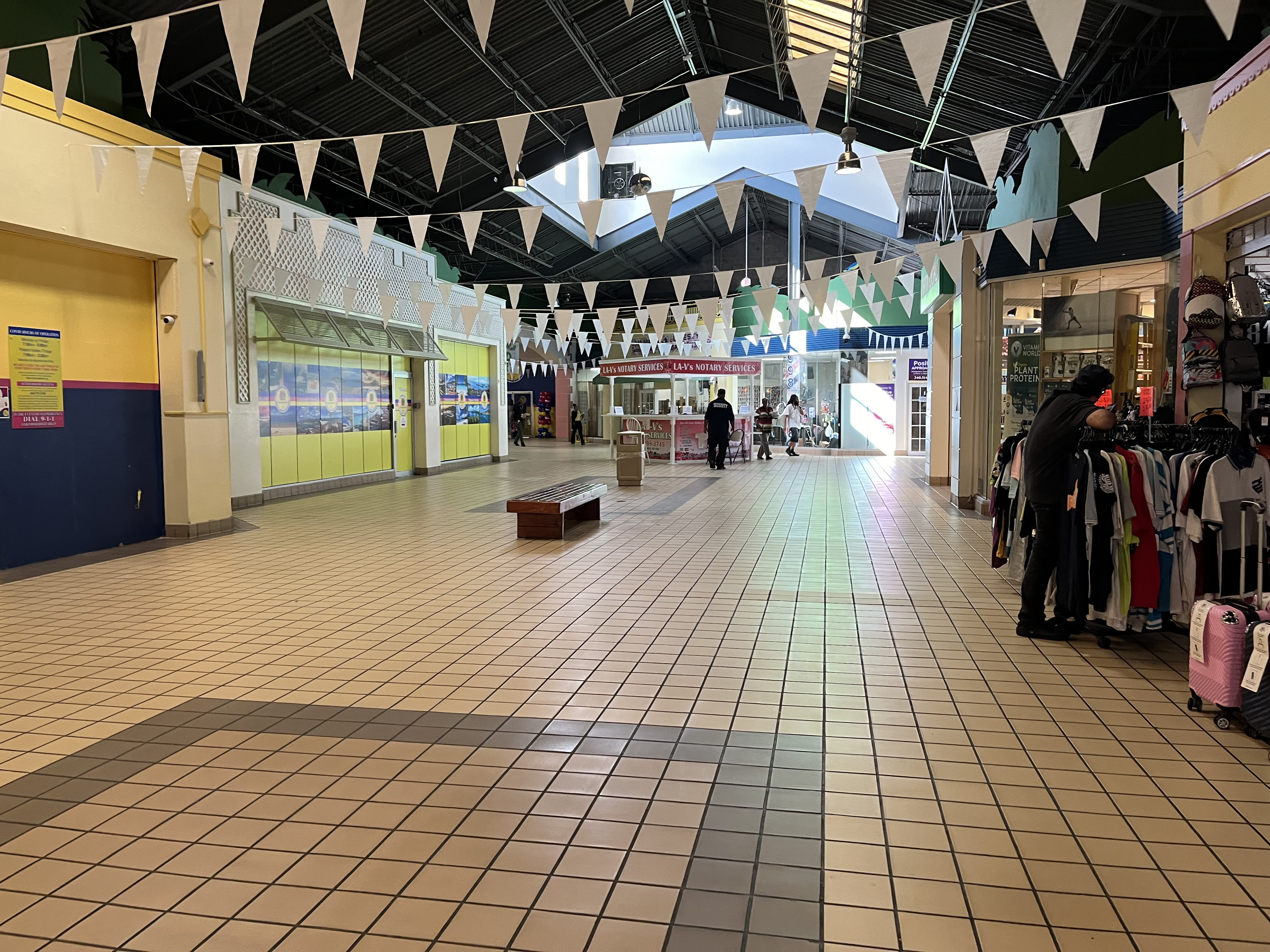
Mall interior, April 2024

Tutu Park Mall is an enclosed mall located in Anna's Retreat on Saint Thomas, U.S. Virgin Islands.

The mall opened on June 3, 1993. It is the first and only indoor mall on Saint Thomas. It is a regional landmark, known locally as "The Mall". Tutu Park Mall not only includes the mall building itself but the surrounded area. It contains over 60 stores, with the last Kmart in the island and The Market serving as anchor stores. Additionally, there is also a food court. Numerous fast food businesses can be found in the area. It also serves as a central gathering point for the local community. Parking is also available. It is located along U.S. Virgin Islands Highway 38. It is centrally located on the island.

Because of its central location, the mall serves as a main transportation hub for VITRAN, the island’s only transit bus system.

== History ==
William Mahaffey and John Foster were the principal partners to start the mall. With other investors, they leased the property from the Hartland family. Prior to construction, the site of the mall was the site of an archaeological excavation. In September 1992, construction started and it was opened a year later.

=== Timeline ===
On February 18, 1999, OfficeMax opened its doors adjacent to Tutu Park Mall.

On February 12, 2007, IHOP opened its first franchise owned by St. Thomas businessman Allison Petrus.

In September 2017, generator issues after Hurricane Maria prompted the mall to close for three weeks.

In June 2018, Tutu Park celebrated 25 years of serving the St. Thomas community. Kmart reopens after being destroyed by Hurricane Irma.

== Events ==
Each year, Tutu Park Mall host its annual Christmas Tree Lighting, Easter Eggstra, Halloween Jamboree, Valentine’s Day, Mother’s & Father’s Day, Back-to-School, Black History Month, Virgin Islands History Month, and Carnival events. The mall also has special sales.

== Current stores & anchors ==
- Kmart (the last store in the United States Virgin Islands)
- The Market (formerly Plaza Extra)
- 139. Asfour Clothing Store
- 119. Best Laundromat
- 243. Carlos Furniture
- 267B. Boost Mobile
- 188A. Best Choice Hair Care
- 127. Champs Sports
- 247. Claire’s
- 215. China Fast Food (food court)
- 183. FashionSource
- 181. Dress for Less
- 188B. Double Scoops Ice Cream
- 150. Foot Locker
- 169. JustMe Fashion
- 102B. Luxury Box
- 249. Just Threads
- 269. K&J’s Clothing
- 104. Kandy’s Fashion
- 155. Rainbow Shops
- 153. Rainbow Kids
- 103. Kiwisat
- LA-V’s Notary Services
- 188B. LTS Enterprise
- 195. Lifestyle Barbershop
- 193. La Deli & Clothing Store (opening soon)
- 133. Mail Plus
- 245A. MVUS
- 157. New Horizon Clothing II
- 261. Payless
- 177. Perfume World
- 194. Positive Approach
- 125. ProFectionz Beauty Bar
- 213. Rosario’s Spanish Food (food court)
- 135A. Sanchez Services
- 179. United States Postal Service
- 189. East End Medical Center
- 245. St. Thomas East End Dental Clinic
- 102A. EnVision Tomorrow Office
- 253. VIDE offices
- 231. VI Bureau of Motor Vehicles
- 251. Vina Nails & Spa
- 187. Vitamin World
- 227. VIP Smoothies
- 188B. Speedy Redemption
- 255. Vision Center
- 209. WIC Clinic

=== Outparcels ===
- Advance Auto Parts
- OfficeMax
- DPNR office
- One Communications
- McDonald’s

== Former stores ==
- Marianne - closed 2026
- Subway (2003-2021)
- Domino’s Pizza
- Dollar Store
- Scotiabank - closed 2018
- Helen Boutique
- RadioShack - closed 2017
- IHOP - closed 2008
