= Smith Bay, U.S. Virgin Islands =

Settlement on the coast of St. Thomas Island, U.S. Virgin Islands

Coordinates: 18.3411678°N 64.8662509°W

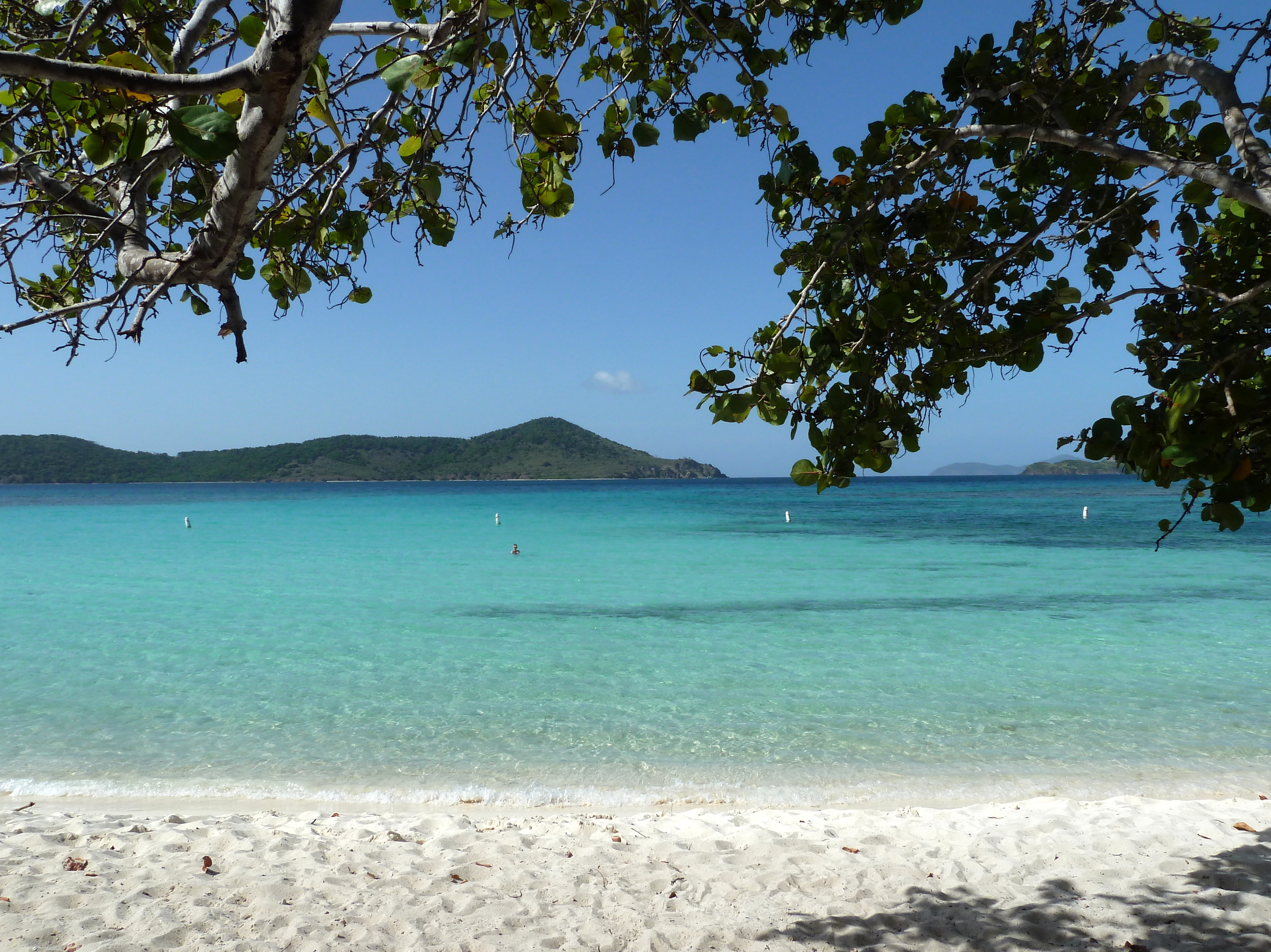
Lindquist Beach/Smith Bay Park, St. Thomas

Smith Bay is a settlement on the East End of the island of St. Thomas in the United States Virgin Islands.

Beaches on the Atlantic coast of Smith Bay include Sugar Bay, Lindquist Beach (Smith Bay Park), and Sapphire Beach.
