= Districts and sub-districts of the United States Virgin Islands =

Districts of the U.S. Virgin Islands
- Category: County equivalent
- Location: United States Virgin Islands
- Number: 2 (administrative districts); 3 (census districts)
- Populations: 3,881 (Saint John) – 42,461 (Saint Thomas (census districts)
- Areas: 19.69 sq mi (51.0 km^{2}) (Saint John) – 83.32 sq mi (215.8 km^{2}) (Saint Croix) (census districts)
- Government: Local government
- Subdivisions: Subdistrict

== Districts ==
The territorial government of the United States Virgin Islands has for operational purposes established two districts, which include the minor islets nearest to the major islands:

1. Saint Croix
2. Saint Thomas and Saint John

The U.S. Virgin Islands legislature has 15 seats: 7 seats are for the Saint Croix District, 7 seats are for the Saint Thomas and Saint John District, and one seat is for someone who must live in Saint John.

The U.S. Virgin Islands have no municipalities; the only government is for the territory as a whole.

=== History of the districts ===
The Colonial Law of 1863 divided the islands into two municipalities: St. Croix, and St. Thomas–St. John. Each municipality was served by a Colonial Council. After the United States had purchased the islands, the U.S. Congress passed the Organic Act of 1936, under which the two Colonial Councils became Municipal Councils. In 1954, the Revised Organic Act of the Virgin Islands created a unicameral body called the Legislature of the Virgin Islands, consisting of 11 members across three districts (one district for each major island). In 1966, the United States Congress and the Virgin Islands Legislature passed a resolution, which increased the number of seats from 11 to 15, changed the number districts back to two, and changed the distribution of seats to its current distribution.

== Subdistricts ==
The territory has historically been divided into quarters (which are not one-fourth of anything) and estates. These were used for census purposes until 1980, and estates are commonly used for navigation, writing addresses, and discussing real estate. The U.S. Census uses three districts (Saint Thomas, Saint John, and Saint Croix) as county equivalents.

In more recent census decades, quarters and estates have been replaced by 20 census subdistricts, which were defined by the territorial government as more meaningful given the terrain and current population distribution. These are used as minor civil divisions.

| Map | Division | Population | | Land area | |
| # | Division | 2020 | 2010 | sq mi | km^{2} |
|---|---|---|---|---|---|
| | Saint Croix | 41,004 | 50,601 | 83.32 | 215.80 |
| 1 | Anna's Hope Village | 3,282 | 4,041 | 9.89 | 25.61 |
| 2 | Christiansted | 1,866 | 2,626 | 0.76 | 1.97 |
| 2 | Christiansted town | 1,770 | 2,433 | 0.51 | 1.32 |
| 3 | East End | 2,336 | 2,453 | 12.91 | 33.44 |
| 4 | Frederiksted | 2,303 | 3,091 | 1.38 | 3.57 |
| 4 | Frederiksted town | 528 | 859 | 0.17 | 0.44 |
| 5 | Northcentral | 4,197 | 4,977 | 12.66 | 32.79 |
| 6 | Northwest | 3,431 | 4,863 | 18.19 | 47.11 |
| 7 | Sion Farm | 10,332 | 13,003 | 9.40 | 24.35 |
| 8 | Southcentral | 7,415 | 8,049 | 12.62 | 32.69 |
| 9 | Southwest | 5,842 | 7,498 | 5.51 | 14.27 |
| | Saint Thomas | 42,261 | 51,634 | 31.31 | 81.09 |
| 1 | Charlotte Amalie | 14,477 | 18,481 | 3.36 | 8.70 |
| 1 | Charlotte Amalie town | 8,194 | 10,354 | 1.21 | 3.13 |
| 2 | East End | 7,502 | 8,403 | 5.26 | 13.62 |
| 3 | Northside | 8,889 | 10,049 | 10.59 | 27.43 |
| 4 | Southside | 4,112 | 5,411 | 4.42 | 11.45 |
| 5 | Tutu | 5,129 | 6,867 | 1.52 | 3.94 |
| 6 | Water Island | 164 | 182 | 0.97 | 2.51 |
| 7 | West End | 1,988 | 2,241 | 5.19 | 13.44 |
| | Saint John | 3,881 | 4,170 | 19.69 | 51.00 |
| 1 | Central | 470 | 779 | 14.09 | 36.49 |
| 2 | Coral Bay | 724 | 634 | 1.91 | 4.95 |
| 3 | Cruz Bay | 2,652 | 2,706 | 2.77 | 7.17 |
| 4 | East End | 35 | 51 | 0.92 | 2.38 |
| | U.S. Virgin Islands | 87,146 | 106,405 | 134.32 | 347.89 |

== See also ==
- List of settlements in the United States Virgin Islands
- Islands of U.S. Virgin Islands
- Minor islands of the United States Virgin Islands
