= Tutu, U.S. Virgin Islands =

Tutu
- Subdistrict
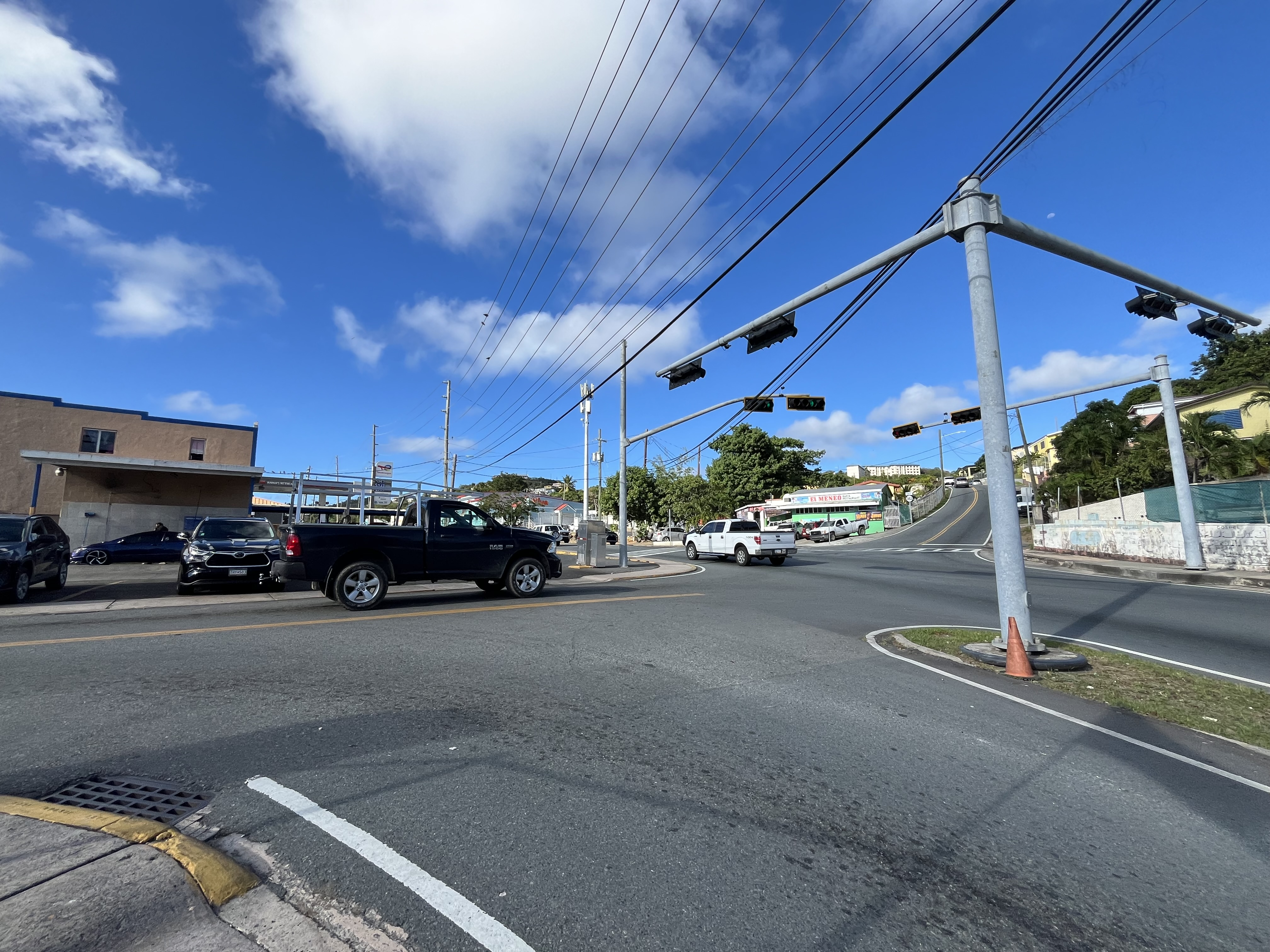

- Location within the United States Virgin Islands
- Coordinates: 18°20′N 64°53′W
- Country: United States
- Territory: U.S. Virgin Islands
- District: Saint Thomas

Population (2010)
  - Total: 6,867
- Area code: 340

Tutu, also known as Estate Tutu is one of the seven administrative subdistricts on Saint Thomas island in the United States Virgin Islands. It is located in eastern St. Thomas and is mostly made up of the second-largest town or census-designated place (CDP) in the U.S.V.I., Anna's Retreat in the Tutu Valley, sometimes nicknamed Tutu. The word tutu, in Danish, means a trumpet-like conch shell which was used to call the slaves to work. According to the U.S. Census Bureau in 2010 the population was 6,867, which is down from 8,197 in 2000 and further down from 9,100 in the U.S. Census of 1990. Tutu is known as a densely populated residential area and is second only to the territorial historical capital of Charlotte Amalie in terms of highest population density on the island of Saint Thomas. It is home to approximately 20 percent of the island population and has a total area of 1.5 square miles. There have been numerous excavations in an area known as the Tutu Archaeological Village Site, which has discovered numerous artifacts from the native Arawak people who inhabited the area in the pre-Columbian era.

== Places of interest ==
- Tillet Gardens Center for the Arts: an arts community named for its founder, British textile designer and painter Jim Tillett. It is home to numerous artists’ galleries and studios, including for instance Ridvan Studio, a working clay studio, and FStop, which is a photo gallery. There are numerous musical performances and activities taking place at the Tillett Gardens, including the Classics in the Gardens, which is a classical music series presented outdoors after dark, and the annual Arts Alive fair which is held every November. It was opened in 1959 and is said to have the greatest collection of Virgin Islands’ art.
- Pistarckle Theater: a 100-seat theater, which offers summer film series and acting classes, in addition to their six annual productions.
- Tutu Park Mall: the first shopping mall built in the U.S.V.I and now home to the largest store on the island, Plaza Extra, and more than fifty other retail shops.

The Tutu Plantation House, built c.1803, survived as of 1976, and was listed on the U.S. National Register of Historic Places.
