= Cruz Bay, U.S. Virgin Islands =

Cruz Bay
- Census-Designated Place
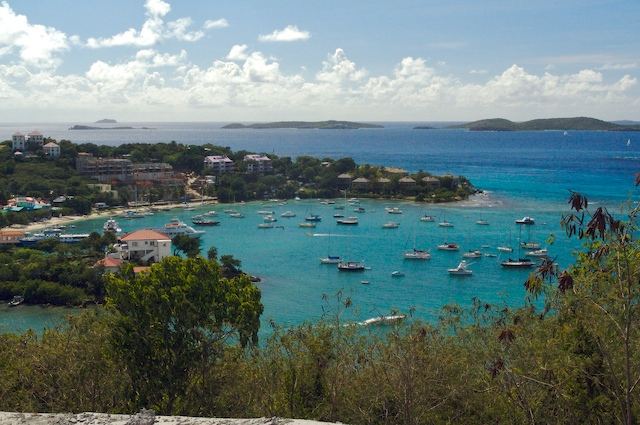

- Location within the United States Virgin Islands
- Country: United States
- Territory: U.S. Virgin Islands
- District: Saint John
- Subdistrict(s): Cruz Bay, Central

Population (2020)
  - Total: 2,772
- Time zone: UTC-04:00 (AST)
- ZIP code: 00830, 00831
- Area code: 340

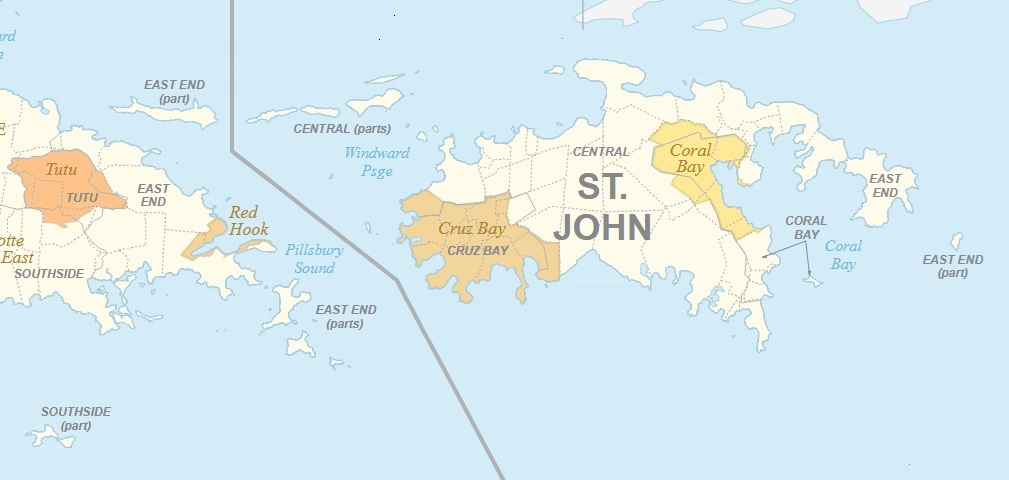
St John Subdistricts and Census-Designated Places

Cruz Bay, U.S. Virgin Islands is the main census-designated place (CDP) on the island of Saint John in the United States Virgin Islands. It is the fourth largest town or census-designated place (CDP) in the U.S. Virgin Islands (after Charlotte Amalie, Anna's Retreat, and Charlotte Amalie West). According to the 2020 census, Cruz Bay had a population of 2,772.

== Community ==
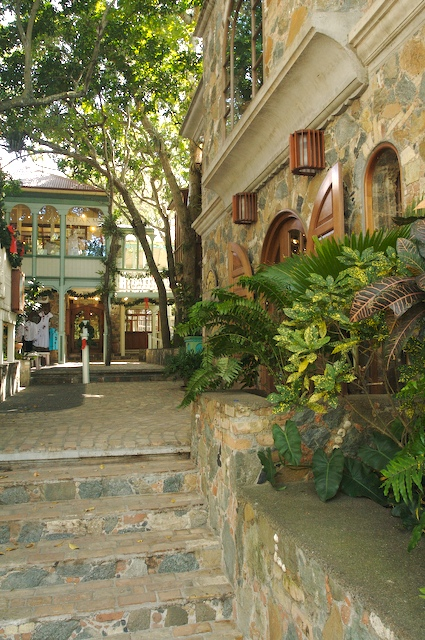
Entrance to Mongoose Junction, a popular shopping center in Cruz Bay, U.S. Virgin Islands.

Cruz Bay, located on the west coast of Saint John, is the island's largest commercial center and the location of the main port on Saint John. The primary access to Saint John is through Cruz Bay Harbor. Frequent barge and ferry, including car ferry, service connects Saint John to the neighboring more-developed island of Saint Thomas. Ferries also run regularly between Cruz Bay and Tortola, Virgin Gorda, and Jost Van Dyke in the British Virgin Islands.

Cruz Bay is home to numerous shops and restaurants which are frequented by tourists and locals alike. The Virgin Islands National Park Visitor Center, the Elaine Sprauve Library, and a United States Post Office are also located in Cruz Bay.

Cruz Bay beach is lined with beach bars and shops. There is also a casino. The beach has soft white sand, a designated swimming area, and space for day boaters to anchor.

The National Park Service has its headquarters near the waterfront in Cruz Bay as does U.S. Customs and Immigration.

The Cruz Bay Town Historic District was listed on the U.S. National Register of Historic Places in 2016.

== Climate ==
According to the Köppen system, Cruz Bay has a tropical savanna climate, abbreviated Aw on climate maps. On 31 July 1988, Cruz Bay recorded a temperature of 37.2 °C (99.0 °F), which is the highest temperature to have ever been recorded in the United States Virgin Islands.

Climate data for Cruz Bay, United States Virgin Islands
Month	Jan	Feb	Mar	Apr	May	Jun	Jul	Aug	Sep	Oct	Nov	Dec	Year
Mean daily maximum °F (°C)	83.8 (28.8)	84.0 (28.9)	84.1 (28.9)	84.9 (29.4)	86.4 (30.2)	88.0 (31.1)	88.9 (31.6)	89.2 (31.8)	89.0 (31.7)	88.2 (31.2)	86.7 (30.4)	84.6 (29.2)	86.5 (30.3)
Mean daily minimum °F (°C)	69.6 (20.9)	69.5 (20.8)	69.7 (20.9)	71.7 (22.1)	74.0 (23.3)	75.8 (24.3)	75.9 (24.4)	75.9 (24.4)	75.1 (23.9)	74.2 (23.4)	72.7 (22.6)	70.6 (21.4)	72.9 (22.7)
Average rainfall inches (mm)	2.7 (69)	1.9 (48)	2.0 (51)	3.5 (89)	4.0 (100)	2.5 (64)	3.3 (84)	4.3 (110)	6.0 (150)	4.9 (120)	6.3 (160)	3.2 (81)	44.7 (1,140)
Source: Weatherbase

== Demographics ==
=== 2020 Census ===
Cruz Bay CDP, U.S. Virgin Islands – Racial and ethnic composition Note: the US Census treats Hispanic/Latino as an ethnic category. This table excludes Latinos from the racial categories and assigns them to a separate category. Hispanics/Latinos may be of any race.
Race / Ethnicity (NH = Non-Hispanic)	Pop 2020	% 2020
White alone (NH)	836	30.16%
Black or African American alone (NH)	1,408	50.79%
Native American or Alaska Native alone (NH)	19	0.69%
Asian alone (NH)	15	0.54%
Native Hawaiian or Pacific Islander alone (NH)	1	0.04%
Other race alone (NH)	0	0.00%
Mixed race or Multiracial (NH)	52	1.88%
Hispanic or Latino (any race)	448	16.16%
Total	2,779	100.00%

== Gallery ==
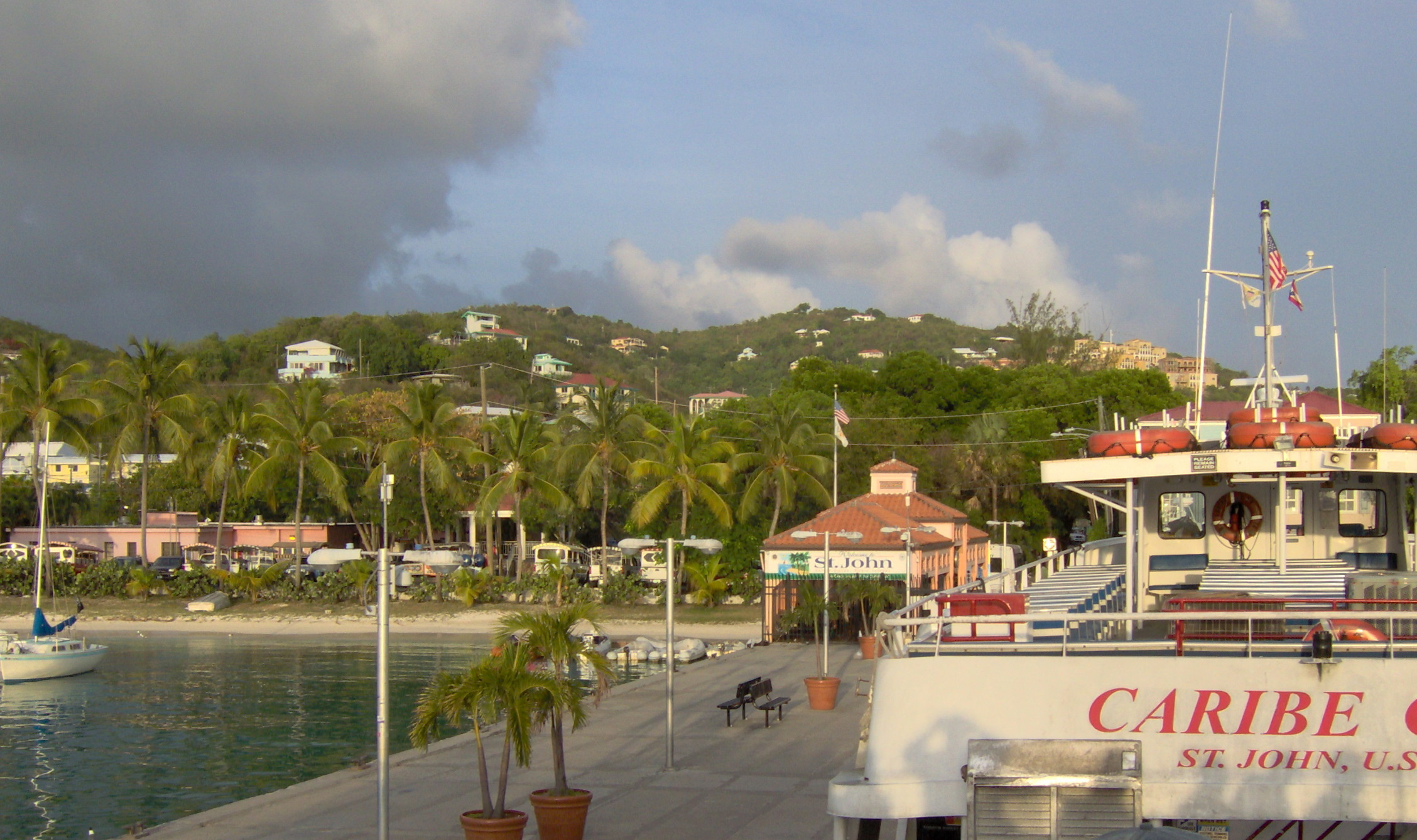
Landing pier at Cruz Bay.

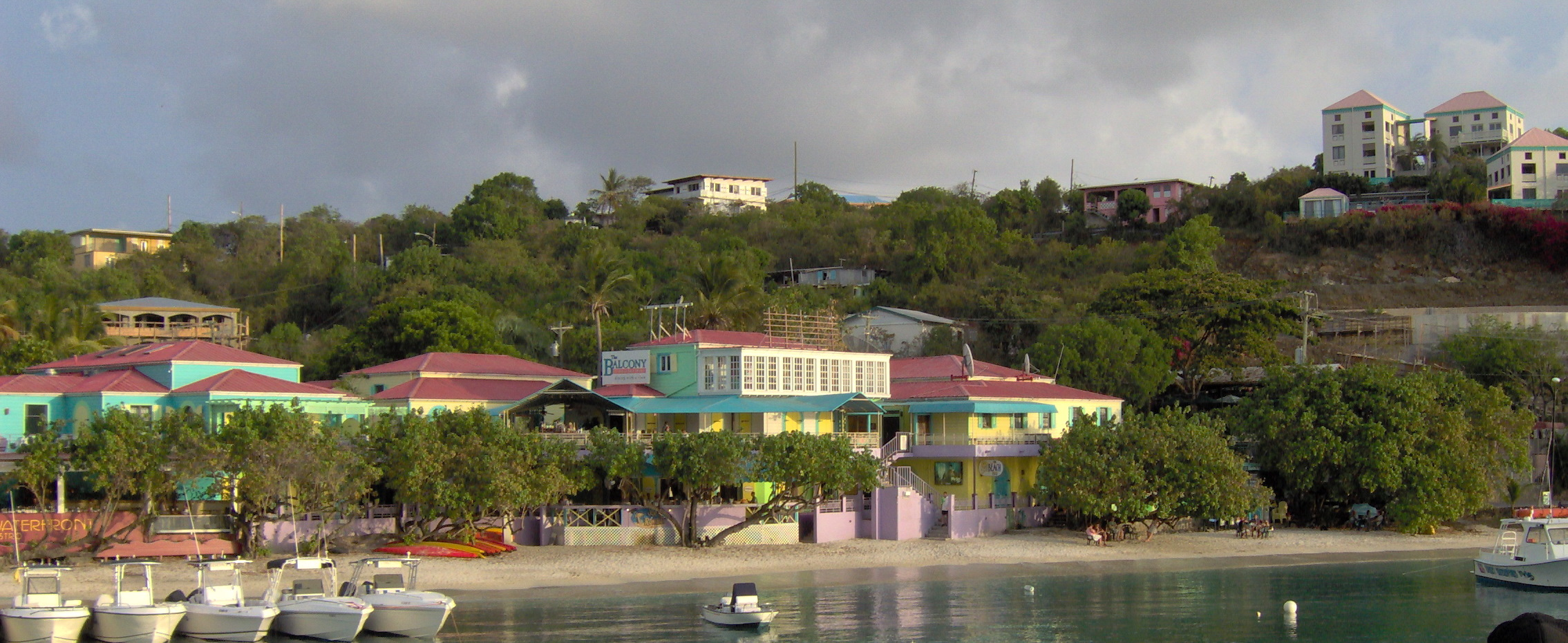
Cruz Bay

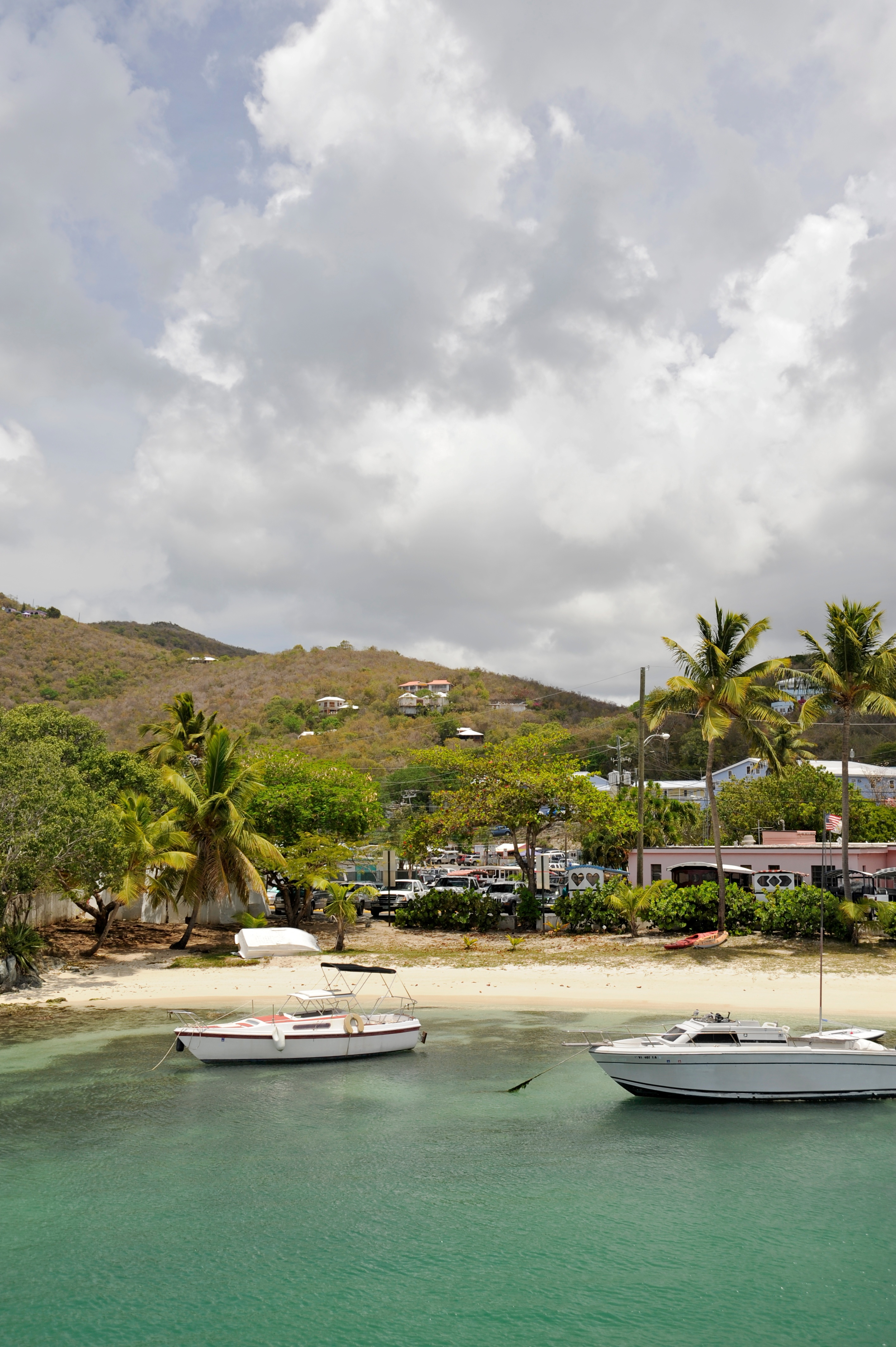
Cruz Bay

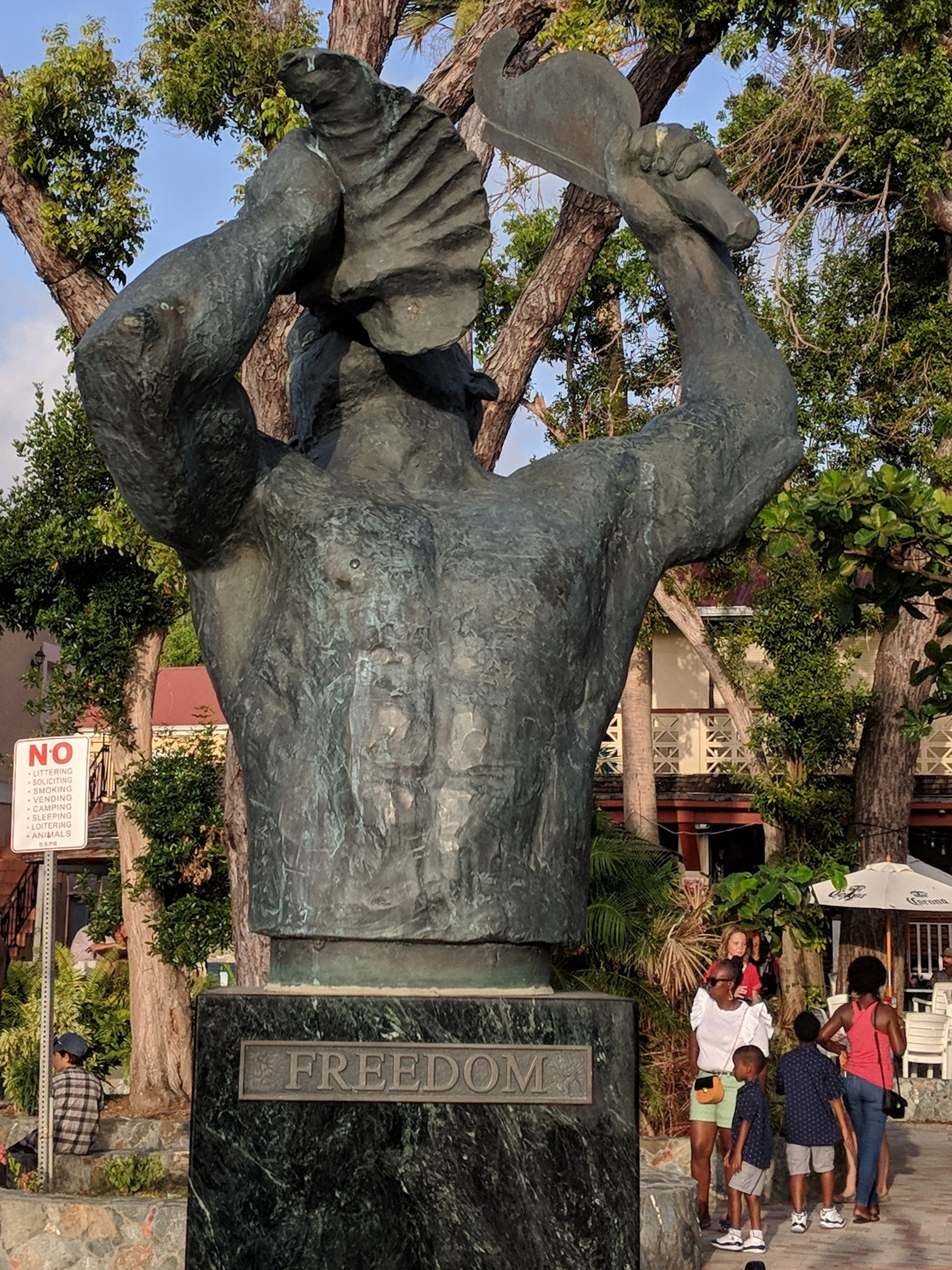
Conch Blower statue, Franklin Powell Park
