= Danish West Indian rigsdaler =

Currency of the Danish West Indies until 1849

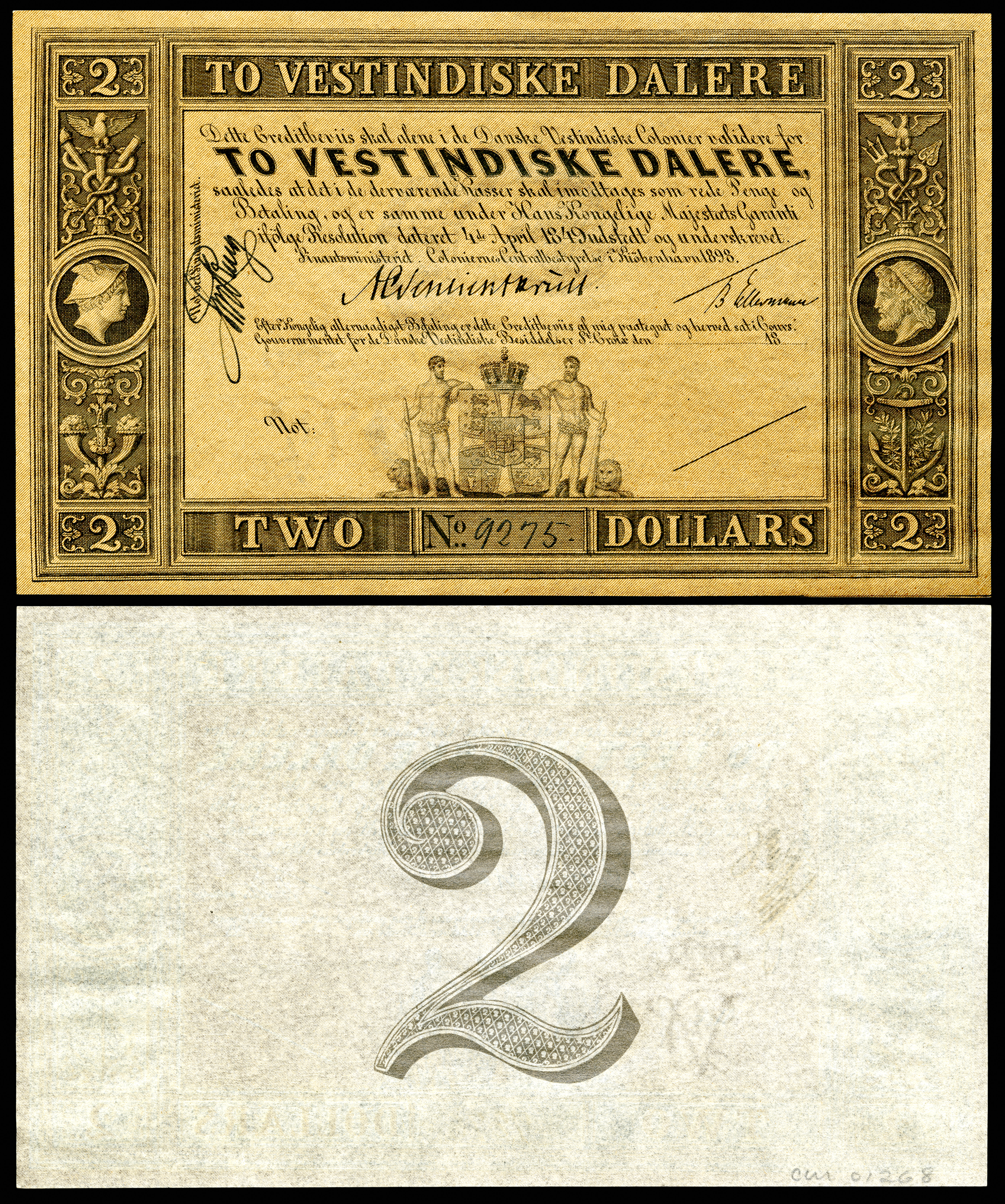
A 2 dalere bill used in the Danish West Indies

The rigsdaler was the currency of the Danish West Indies (now the U.S. Virgin Islands) until 1849. It was subdivided into 96 skilling. The rigsdaler was equal to 4/5 Danish rigsdaler. The rigsdaler was replaced by the daler.

== Coins ==
In 1766 and 1767, 6, 12 and 24 skilling coins were struck in silver for the Danish West Indies. These were followed in 1816 by silver 2, 10 and 20 skilling coins, which were struck until 1848. All the coins carried the wording "Dansk Amerik(ansk) M(ynt)" (Danish American Coinage) to distinguish them from regular Danish coins.

== Banknotes ==
In 1784 and 1785, some Danish 5 rigsdaler courant notes were reissued for use in the West Indies with new denomination of 6 1/4 rigsdaler printed on the previously blank reverses. Regular issues began in 1788 with denominations of 20, 50 and 100 rigsdaler. 5 and 10 rigsdaler notes were added in 1806 when the 20 rigsdaler denomination was discontinued.
