= United States Virgin Islands =

U.S. territory in the Caribbean

Virgin Islands of the United States
- Unincorporated and organized U.S. territory
- Flag Seal
- Motto: "United in Pride and Hope"
- Anthem: "Virgin Islands March" (regional) "The Star-Spangled Banner" (official)
- Location of the United States Virgin Islands (red)
- Sovereign state: United States (Note: Despite being under the sovereignty of the United States since 1917, the USVI has not been fully incorporated into the country for constitutional purposes. See the page for the Insular Cases for more information.)
- Before purchase: Danish West Indies
- Transfer from Denmark: March 31, 1917
- Capital and largest city: Charlotte Amalie; 18°21′N 64°56′W
- Official languages: English
- Vernacular language: Virgin Islands Creole
- Ethnic groups (2020): By race: 71.4% Black; 16.6% White; 7.5% Multiracial; 3.0% other; 1.0% Asian; By ethnicity: 81.6% non-Hispanic or Latino; 18.4% Hispanic or Latino
- Religion (2022): 86.7% Christianity; 8.4% no religion; 4.9% other
- Demonym(s): Virgin Islander; U.S. Virgin Islander
- Government: Devolved presidential constitutional dependency
  - President: Donald Trump (R)
  - Governor: Albert Bryan Jr. (D)
  - Lieutenant Governor: Tregenza Roach (D)
- Legislature: Legislature of the Virgin Islands

United States Congress
  - House delegate: Stacey Plaskett (D)

Area
  - Total: 133.73 sq mi (346.4 km^{2})
  - Water (%): negligible
- Highest elevation: 474 m (1,555 ft)

Population
  - 2020 census: 87,146
  - Density: 653.6/sq mi (252.4/km^{2})
- GDP (PPP): 2019 estimate
  - Per capita: $38,136
- GDP (nominal): 2022 estimate
  - Total: $4.6 billion
  - Per capita: $44,320
- HDI (2019): ▲0.892 very high · 31st
- Currency: United States dollar (USD)
- Time zone: UTC−04:00 (AST)
- Date format: mm/dd/yyyy
- Driving side: Left
- Calling code: +1
- USPS abbreviation: VI
- Trad. abbreviation: U.S.V.I.
- ISO 3166 code: VI; US-VI
- Internet TLD: .vi
- Website: vi.gov

The United States Virgin Islands, (Note: Danish: Amerikanske Jomfruøer. Also called the American Virgin Islands and the U.S. Virgin Islands.) officially the Virgin Islands of the United States, is a Caribbean unincorporated territory of the United States. The islands are geographically part of the Virgin Islands archipelago and are located in the Leeward Islands of the Lesser Antilles. The islands have a tropical climate.

The U.S. Virgin Islands consist of the main islands of Saint Croix, Saint John, and Saint Thomas and 50 other surrounding minor islands and cays. The total land area of the territory is 133.73 square miles (346.36 km^{2}). The territory's capital is Charlotte Amalie on the island of St. Thomas.

Previously known as the Danish West Indies, controlled by Denmark–Norway (from 1754 to 1814) and the Kingdom of Denmark (from 1814 to 1917), they were sold to the United States by Denmark for $25 million ($628 million in 2025) in the 1917 Treaty of the Danish West Indies and have since been an organized, unincorporated United States territory. The U.S. Virgin Islands are organized under the 1954 Revised Organic Act of the Virgin Islands and have held five constitutional conventions. Like other territories of the United States, the U.S. Virgin Islands elects a delegate who can participate in debates in the House of Representatives but cannot vote.

The primary economic activities on the islands are tourism and services.

== Etymology ==
The islands were named Santa Úrsula y las Once Mil Vírgenes by Christopher Columbus in 1493 after the legend of Saint Ursula and the 11,000 virgins. The name was later shortened to the Virgin Islands.

== History ==
=== Pre-European contact ===
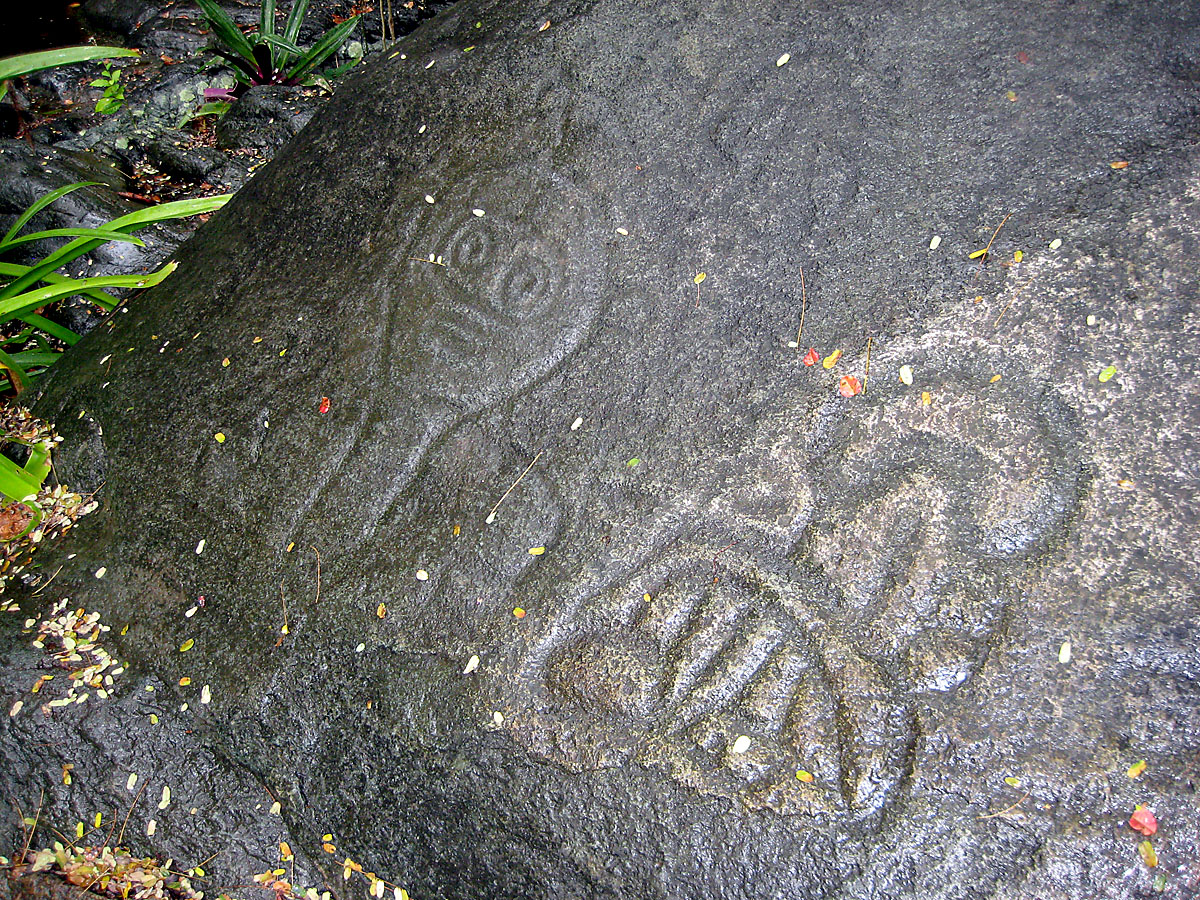
Ancient petroglyphs in the Virgin Islands National Park

The U.S. Virgin Islands were originally inhabited by Arawakan-speaking peoples, with some scholars thinking that the islands were inhabited from as early as 1000 BC. The Kalinago (Island Caribs) arrived around the mid-15th century AD.

=== Early European settlers ===
Christopher Columbus, on his second voyage in 1493, is thought to have been the first European to see the islands, giving them their current name. The Spanish later settled in 1555, with English and French settlers arriving on St. Croix from 1625. There followed a complex period in which the islands were disputed among Spain, France, Great Britain, and the Netherlands.

=== Danish period ===
Denmark–Norway also took an interest in the islands, and the Danish West India Company settled on St. Thomas in 1672 and St. John in 1694, later buying St. Croix from France in 1733. The islands became royal Danish colonies in 1754, named the Danish West Indian Islands (Danish: De dansk-vestindiske øer). Initially the currency was the Danish West Indian rigsdaler, replaced by the daler in 1849. The islands proved ideal for sugar plantations: sugarcane, produced by enslaved Africans, drove the islands' economy during the 18th and early 19th centuries. Other plantation crops included cotton and indigo dye. During the 17th and 18th centuries, a sizable Jewish community also began to settle on the islands.

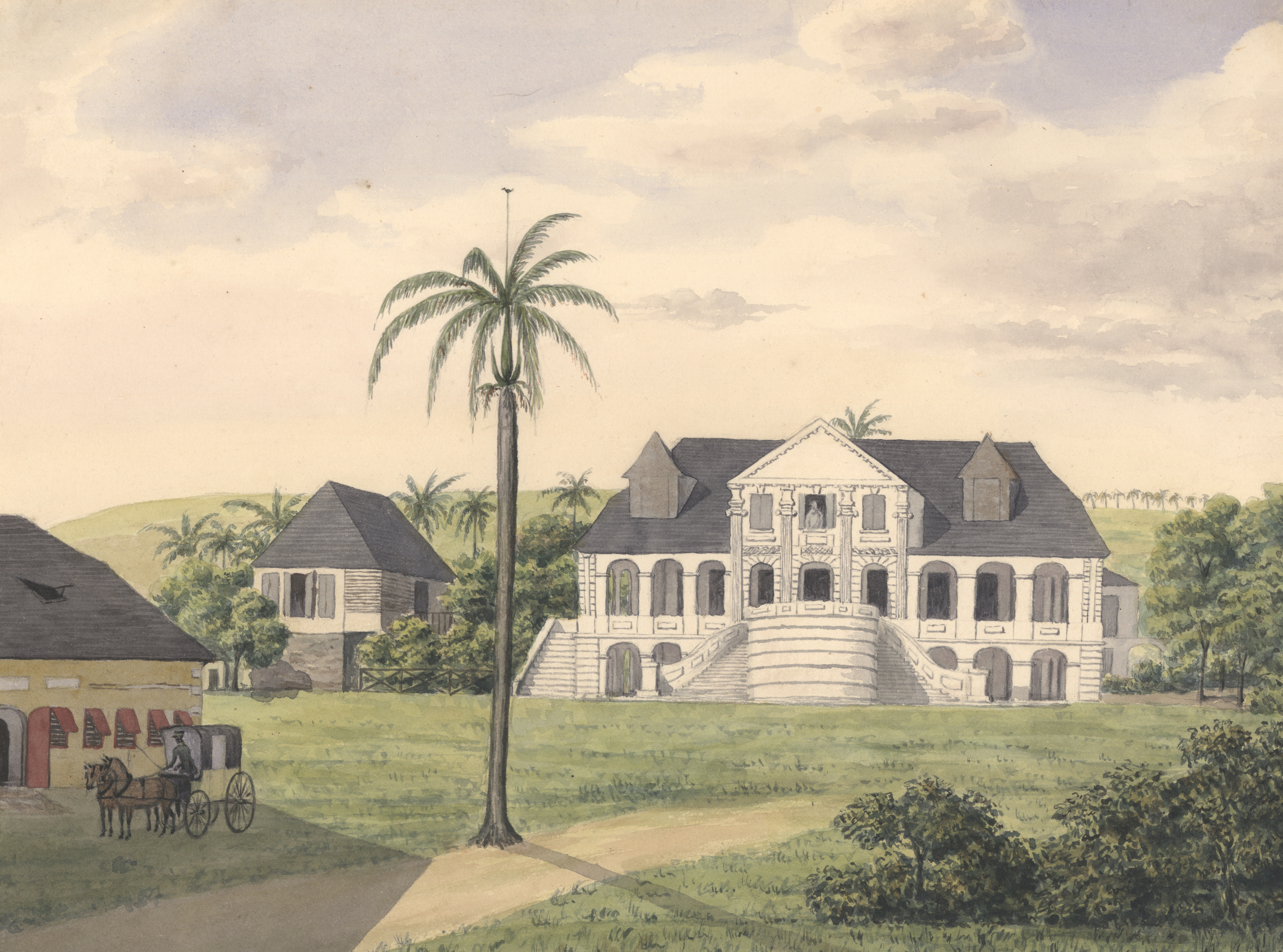
The Høgensborg estate on Sankt Croix, 1833

In 1733, St. John was the site of one of the first significant slave rebellions in the New World when enslaved Akan–Akwamu from the Gold Coast (modern Ghana) took over the island for six months. The Danish were able to defeat the freedom fighting Africans with help from the French in Martinique. Instead of allowing themselves to be recaptured, more than a dozen of the ringleaders shot themselves before the French forces could capture them. It is estimated that by 1775, slaves outnumbered the Danish settlers by a ratio of 8:1.

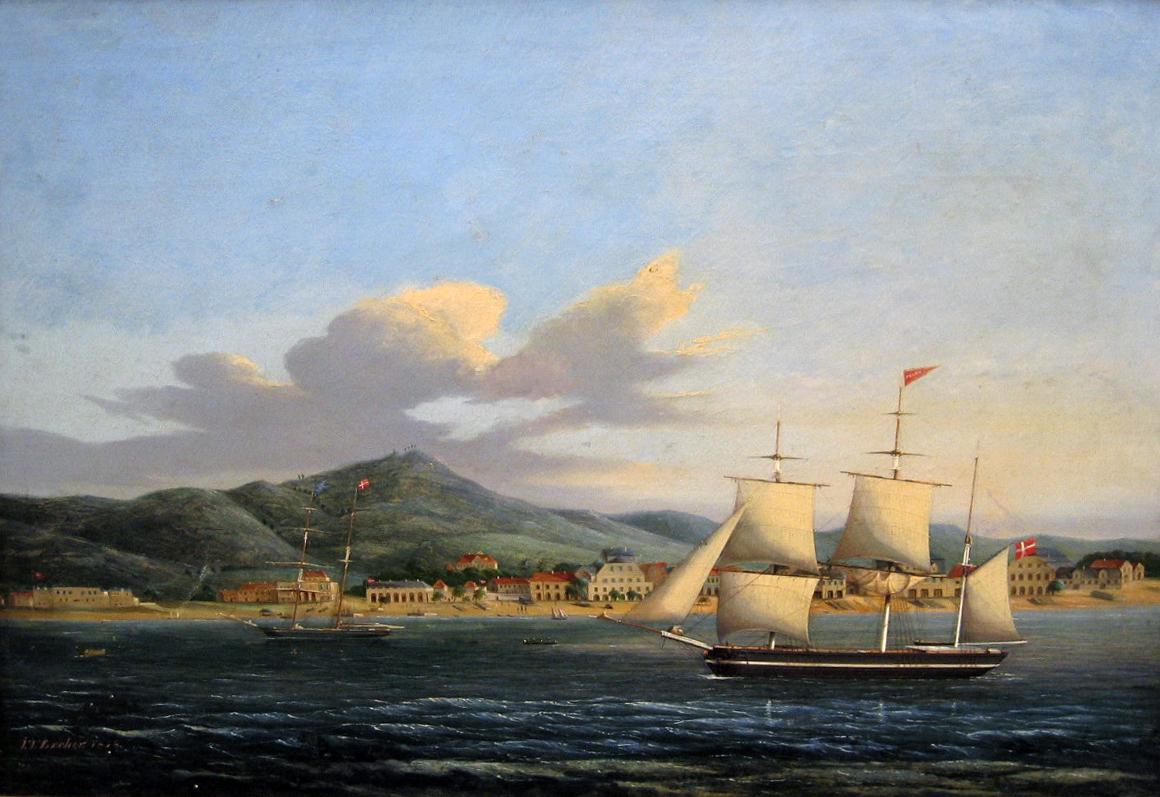
Frederiksstad on Saint Croix, 1848

After another slave rebellion occurred on St. Croix, slavery was abolished by Governor Peter von Scholten on July 3, 1848, now celebrated as Emancipation Day. Over the following years, strict labor laws were implemented several times, leading to the 1878 St. Croix labor riot.

With the plantations no longer as profitable, Danish settlers began to abandon their estates, causing a significant drop in population and the overall economy. Additionally, the 1867 hurricane, earthquake and tsunami further impacted the economy. For the remainder of the period of Danish rule, the islands were not economically viable and significant transfers had to be made from the Danish state budget to the authorities on the islands.

The United States began to take an interest in the islands, and in 1867 a treaty to sell St. Thomas and St. John to the U.S. was agreed but never effected. A number of reforms aimed at reviving the islands' economy were attempted, but none had great success. A second draft treaty to sell the islands to the United States was negotiated in 1902 but was defeated in the upper house of the Danish parliament in a tie vote (because the opposition carried a 97-year-old life member into the chamber).

The onset of World War I brought the reform period to a close and again left the islands isolated. During the submarine warfare phases of the war, the United States, fearing that the islands might be seized by Germany as a submarine base, again approached Denmark about buying them. After a few months of negotiations, a selling price of $25 million in United States gold coin was agreed, and the reciprocal agreement by the United States that they ceded political and economic interest in the island of Greenland to Denmark. The sale price was equivalent to $614 million in 2024 US dollars. At the same time, the economics of continued possession weighed heavily on the minds of Danish decision makers, and a consensus in favor of selling emerged in the Danish parliament.

The Treaty of the Danish West Indies was signed on August 4, 1916, with a referendum on the sale held in Denmark in December 1916 in which voters approved the decision to sell. The deal was finalized on January 17, 1917, when the United States and Denmark exchanged their respective treaty ratifications.

=== American period ===
The United States took possession of the islands on March 31, 1917, and the territory was renamed the Virgin Islands of the United States. The population of the islands at the time was about 26,000. Every year, Transfer Day is recognized as a holiday, to commemorate the acquisition of the islands by the United States. Rear Admiral James H. Oliver was the first American governor of the islands. Paul Martin Pearson, the first civilian governor, was appointed by Herbert Hoover and was inaugurated March 18, 1931.

U.S. citizenship was granted to many inhabitants of the islands in 1927 and 1932. The Danish West Indian daler was replaced by the U.S. dollar in 1934, and from 1935 to 1939 the islands were a part of the United States customs area. The 1936 Organic Act and the 1954 Revised Organic Act established the local government. Tourism began to develop following World War II, over time becoming the most important sector of the islands' economy. The Virgin Islands National Park was established in 1956 on St. John, and by 1959, after the embargo of Americans on travel to Cuba, the U.S. Virgin Islands became a popular tourist destination. In 1970, Virgin Islanders elected their first governor, Melvin H. Evans, and from 1976, the islands began work on creating their own constitution.

Water Island, a small island to the south of St. Thomas, was initially administered by the U.S. federal government and did not become a part of the U.S. Virgin Islands territory until 1996, when 50 acres (20 ha) of land was transferred to the territorial government. The remaining 200 acres (81 ha) of the island was acquired from the United States Department of the Interior in May 2005 for $10, a transaction that marked the official change in jurisdiction.

In 1966, Hess Oil began construction of an oil refinery. Until February 2012, the Hovensa plant, located on St. Croix, was one of the world's largest petroleum refineries, refining 494,000 bbl/d (78,500 m^{3}/d), and contributed about 20% of the territory's GDP. The refinery ceased operation in 2012, and the facility stopped exporting petroleum products in 2014. In the final year of full refinery operations, the value of exported petroleum products was $12.7 billion (2011 fiscal year). Since refining ended, the 34,000,000 bbl (5,400,000 m^{3}) tank farm has operated as a crude oil and petrochemical storage facility for third-party customers. The refinery's closure provoked a local economic crisis. Following the acquisition of the 1,500 acres (600 ha) complex by ArcLight Capital Partners, LLC, in 2016, Limetree Bay Ventures, LLC, was formed, and is currently executing a project to refurbish and restart the refinery, with a processing capability of up to 200,000 bbl/d (32,000 m^{3}/d).

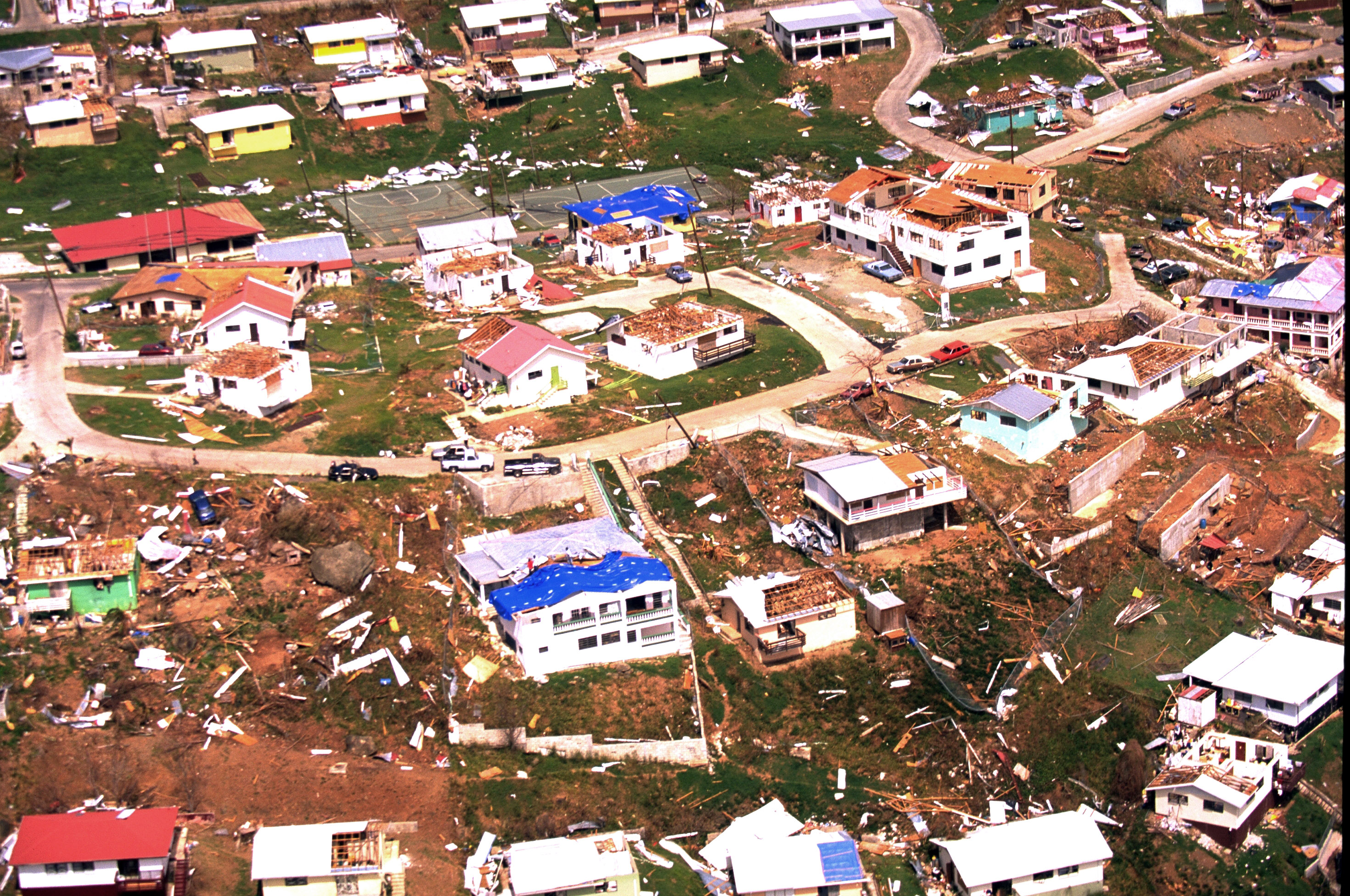
The aftermath of Hurricane Marilyn on the island of St. Thomas, 1995. In recent decades the U.S. Virgin Islands have been devastated by a series of hurricanes.

Hurricane Hugo struck the U.S. Virgin Islands in 1989, causing catastrophic physical and economic damage, particularly on the island of St. Croix. The territory was again struck by Hurricane Marilyn in 1995, killing eight people and causing more than $2 billion in damage. The islands were again struck by hurricanes Bertha, Georges, Lenny, and Omar in 1996, 1998, 1999, and 2008, respectively, but damage was not as severe in those storms.

In September 2017, Category 5 Hurricane Irma caused catastrophic damage, particularly to St. John and St. Thomas. Just two weeks later, Category 5 Hurricane Maria ravaged all three islands. Sustained winds at the Sandy Point National Wildlife Refuge on St. Croix reached 99 to 104 mph (159 to 167 km/h) and gusted to 137 mph (220 km/h). Even stronger winds likely occurred somewhere across the island's west end. The British Virgin Islands and the other two U.S. Virgin Islands, St. John and St. Thomas, were far enough northeast to avoid the worst from Maria, but were still massively impacted, with great destruction everywhere. A wind gust to 86 mph (138 km/h) was reported at St. Thomas. Weather stations on St. Croix recorded 5 and 10 inches (130 and 250 mm) of rain from the hurricane, and estimates for St. John and St. Thomas were somewhat less. The hurricane killed two people, both in their homes: one person drowned and another was trapped by a mudslide. A third person had a fatal heart attack during the hurricane. The hurricane caused extensive and severe damage to St. Croix. After both hurricanes, the office of Virgin Islands congresswoman Stacey Plaskett stated that 90% of buildings in the Virgin Islands were damaged or destroyed and 13,000 of those buildings had lost their roofs. The Luis Hospital suffered roof damage and flooding, but remained operational.

In December 2025, the United States Department of Justice sued the Virgin Islands for "unconstitutional" practices regarding gun rights.

== Geography ==
The three largest islands of the US Virgin Islands
Island	Population (2020 census)	Area	Population density	Largest settlement
St. Thomas	42,261	32 mi^{2} (83 km^{2})	1,319/mi^{2} (509/km^{2})	Charlotte Amalie
St. John	3,881	20 mi^{2} (52 km^{2})	193/mi^{2} (75/km^{2})	Cruz Bay
St. Croix	41,004	83 mi^{2} (215 km^{2})	488/mi^{2} (188/km^{2})	Christiansted

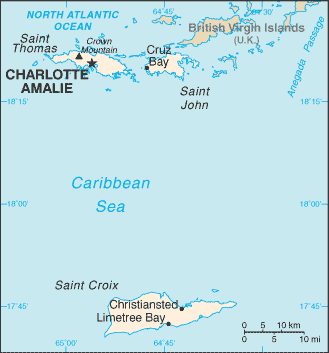
A map of the United States Virgin Islands

The U.S. Virgin Islands are in the Atlantic Ocean, about 40 miles (64 km) east of Puerto Rico and immediately west of the British Virgin Islands. They share the Virgin Islands archipelago with the Puerto Rican Virgin Islands of Vieques and Culebra (administered by Puerto Rico), and the British Virgin Islands.

The territory consists of three main islands: St. Thomas, St. John, and St. Croix, as well as several dozen smaller islands. The main islands have nicknames often used by locals: "Twin City" (St. Croix), "Rock City" (St. Thomas), and "Love City" (St. John). The combined land area of the islands is roughly twice the size of Washington, D.C.

The U.S. Virgin Islands are known for their white sand beaches, including Magens Bay and Trunk Bay, and deepwater harbors along the Anegada Passage, including Charlotte Amalie (the capital) and Christiansted. Like most Caribbean islands, most of the islands of the Virgin Islands, including St. Thomas and St. John, are volcanic in origin and hilly. The highest point is Crown Mountain on St. Thomas at 1,555 feet (474 m). The easternmost point of the United States is Point Udall (U.S. Virgin Islands) on St. Croix.

St. Croix, the largest of the U.S. Virgin Islands, lies to the south and has a flatter terrain because of its coral origin. The National Park Service manages more than half of St. John, nearly all of Hassel Island, and many acres of coral reef.

There are several national park sites, such as the Virgin Islands National Park, Virgin Islands Coral Reef National Monument, Buck Island Reef National Monument, Christiansted National Historic Site, and Salt River Bay National Historical Park and Ecological Preserve.

The U.S. Virgin Islands lie on the boundary of the North American Plate and the Caribbean Plate. Natural hazards include earthquakes, hurricanes and tsunamis.

The U.S. Virgin Islands contain the Leeward Islands moist forests and Leeward Islands xeric scrub terrestrial ecoregions.

=== Climate ===
The United States Virgin Islands experience a tropical climate, with little seasonal change throughout the year. Rainfall is concentrated in the high-sun period (May through October), while in the winter the northeast trade winds prevail. Summer and winter high temperatures differ by 5 °F (3 °C) or less on average.

Climate data for St. Thomas, Virgin Islands
Month	Jan	Feb	Mar	Apr	May	Jun	Jul	Aug	Sep	Oct	Nov	Dec	Year
Record high °F (°C)	93 (34)	93 (34)	94 (34)	96 (36)	97 (36)	99 (37)	98 (37)	99 (37)	98 (37)	97 (36)	95 (35)	92 (33)	99 (37)
Mean daily maximum °F (°C)	85 (29)	85 (29)	86 (30)	87 (31)	88 (31)	89 (32)	90 (32)	90 (32)	90 (32)	89 (32)	87 (31)	86 (30)	88 (31)
Mean daily minimum °F (°C)	72 (22)	73 (23)	73 (23)	74 (23)	76 (24)	78 (26)	78 (26)	78 (26)	78 (26)	77 (25)	75 (24)	74 (23)	76 (24)
Record low °F (°C)	63 (17)	62 (17)	56 (13)	62 (17)	66 (19)	67 (19)	57 (14)	59 (15)	64 (18)	66 (19)	52 (11)	62 (17)	52 (11)
Average precipitation inches (mm)	2.38 (60)	1.48 (38)	1.42 (36)	2.74 (70)	3.06 (78)	2.53 (64)	2.85 (72)	3.74 (95)	5.58 (142)	5.42 (138)	5.23 (133)	2.96 (75)	39.39 (1,001)
Source: weather.com

== Government and politics ==
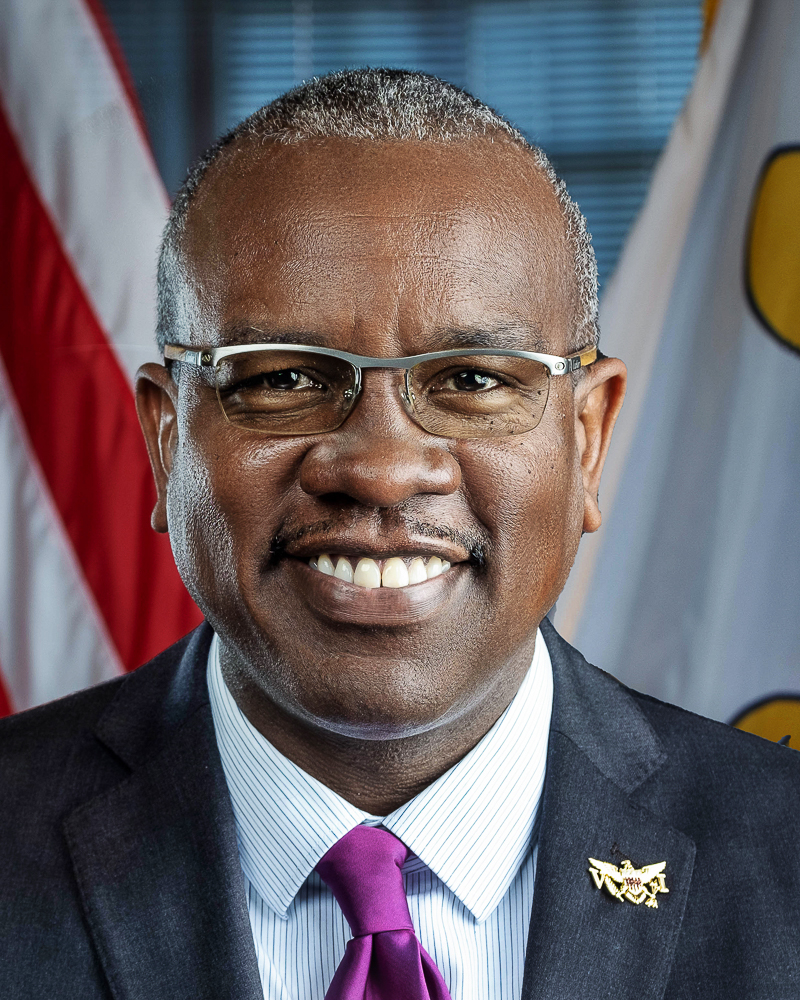
Albert Bryan Jr.
Governor

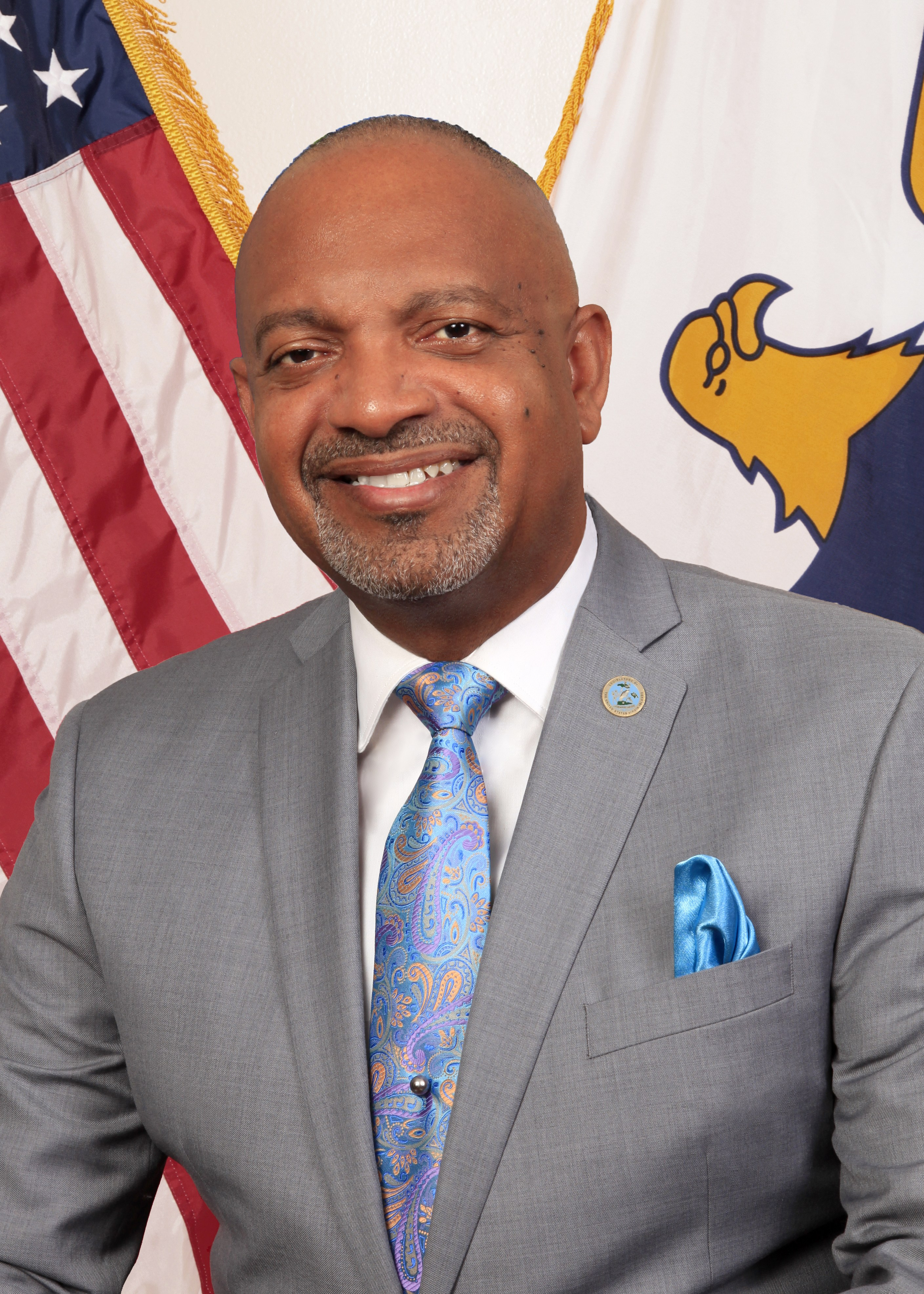
Tregenza Roach
Lieutenant Governor

The U.S. Virgin Islands are an organized, unincorporated United States territory. Although those born on the islands are U.S. citizens, U.S. Virgin Islanders residing in the territory are ineligible to vote for the president of the United States. People born in the U.S. Virgin Islands derive their U.S. citizenship from congressional statute.

The U.S. Democratic and Republican parties allow U.S. Virgin Islands citizens to vote in their presidential primary elections for delegates to the respective national conventions. The main political parties in the U.S. Virgin Islands themselves are the Democratic Party of the Virgin Islands, the Independent Citizens Movement, and the Republican Party of the Virgin Islands. Additional candidates run as independents.

At the national level, the U.S. Virgin Islands elect a delegate to Congress from their at-large congressional district. The elected delegate, while able to vote in committee, cannot participate in floor votes. The current House of Representatives delegate is Stacey Plaskett, a Democrat. Like other territories, the U.S. Virgin Islands does not have U.S. senators.

At the territorial level, fifteen senators—seven from the district of St. Croix, seven from the district of St. Thomas and St. John, and one senator at large who must be a resident of St. John—are elected for two-year terms to the unicameral Virgin Islands legislature. There is no limit as to the number of terms they can serve.

The U.S. Virgin Islands have elected a territorial governor every four years since 1970. Previous governors were appointed by the president of the United States.

=== Legal system ===
The U.S. Virgin Islands have a Superior Court and Supreme Court. The District Court of the Virgin Islands is responsible for cases brought under federal law, and the U.S. attorney for the District of the Virgin Islands can bring federal criminal cases there. The Superior Court is responsible for hearing cases under U.S. Virgin Islands law at the trial level, and the Supreme Court is responsible for appeals from the Superior Court for all appeals filed on or after January 29, 2007. (Appeals filed prior to that date were heard by the Appellate Division of the District Court.) Appeals from the federal District Court are heard by the United States Court of Appeals for the Third Circuit, located in Philadelphia, Pennsylvania. District Court judges are appointed by the U.S. president, while Superior Court and Supreme Court judges are appointed by the governor.

As of 2019, the USVI courts apply both American common law and the 2019 US Virgin Islands Code as passed by the territorial legislature. Because the USVI is not a state and Congress has not determined otherwise, the federal district court is an Article IV tribunal, subject to the authority of the United States secretary of the interior and without lifetime appointment for judges. Elements of Danish law have all been repealed, except for two 1914 laws having to do with customs and ship duties for St. Thomas and St. John.

Attorneys who practice law in the U.S. Virgin Islands must be admitted to the Virgin Islands Bar through either a bar exam or meeting certain requirements for admission on the basis of experience in another reciprocal jurisdiction. The bar exam consists of a standard American Bar Association multistate exam and a local law essay exam. As in the mainland United States, attorneys practice in a variety of settings including private law firms, government, or corporate offices.

=== Constitution ===
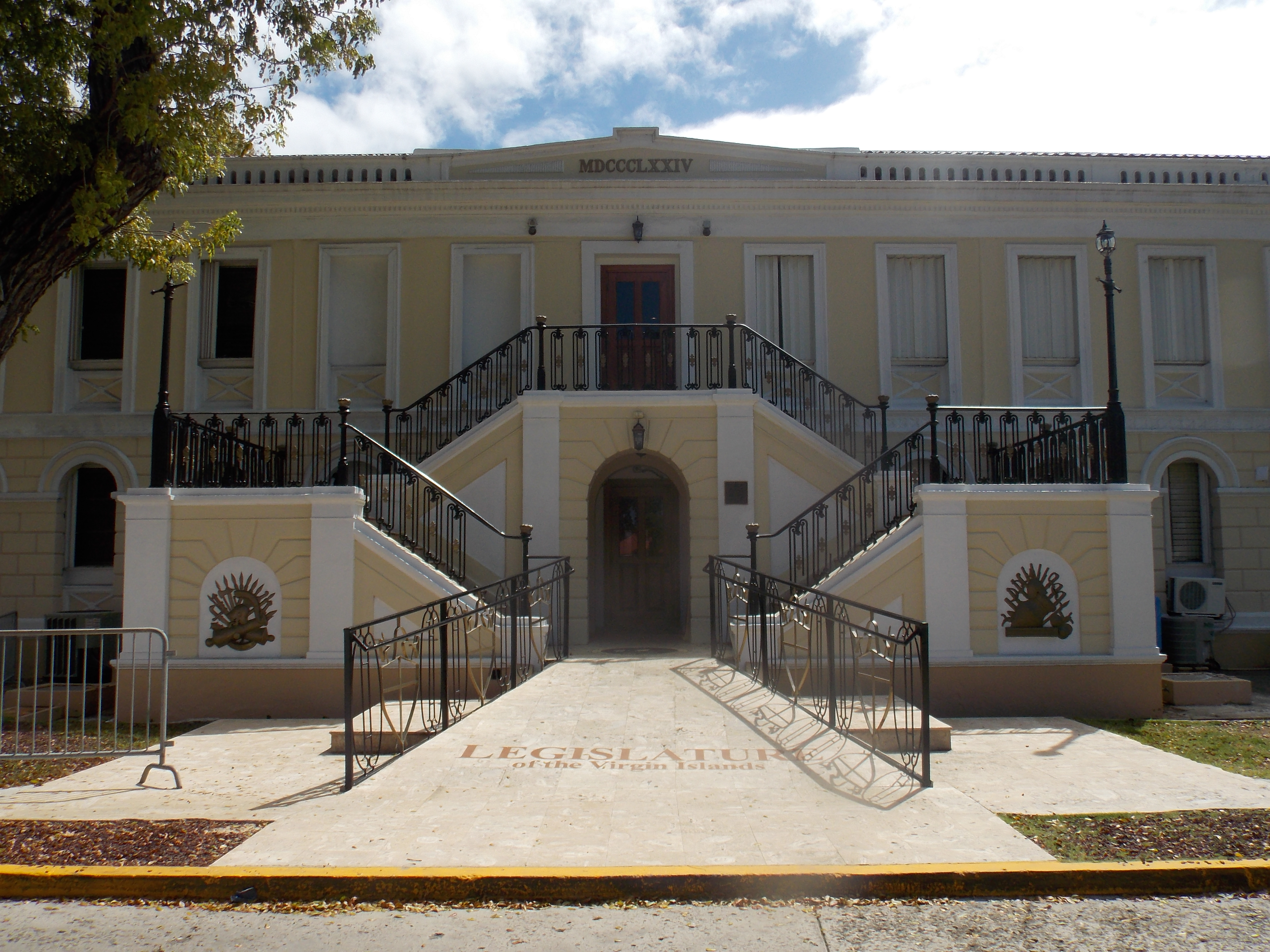
The Legislature Building in Charlotte Amalie

On October 21, 1976, President Gerald Ford signed Pub. L. 94–584 authorizing the people of the United States Virgin Islands to organize a government pursuant to a constitution, which would be automatically approved if Congress did not act within 60 days.

In 2004, an act was passed by the legislature of the Virgin Islands calling for a fifth constitutional convention, and 30 delegates to the convention were elected in 2007. On May 26, 2009, the convention adopted a proposed Constitution of the Virgin Islands. However, in June 2009, Governor John de Jongh Jr. rejected the resulting constitutional draft, saying the terms of the document would "violate federal law, fail to defer to federal sovereignty and disregard basic civil rights". A lawsuit filed by members of the convention to force Governor de Jongh to forward the document to President Barack Obama was ultimately successful. President Obama forwarded the proposal to Congress in May 2010, along with a report noting concerns raised by the United States Department of Justice that the powers sought exceeded what would be considered allowable under territorial status and restating the issues noted by Governor de Jongh. A U.S. Congressional resolution disapproving of the proposed constitution and requesting that the Fifth Constitutional Convention reconvene to consider changes to address these issues was signed into law by President Obama on June 30, 2010.

Months later, a federal lawsuit was filed in the federal District Court of the Virgin Islands. The lawsuit claimed that the United States had to provide U.S. Virgin Islanders with the ability to be represented in Congress and vote for U.S. president. It alleged that racial discrimination present in the all-white and segregated U.S. Congress of 1917 was the impetus to deny the right to vote to a majority nonwhite constituency. The case was ultimately dismissed on August 16, 2012.

The Fifth Constitutional Convention of the U.S. Virgin Islands met in October 2012 but was not able to produce a revised constitution before its October 31 deadline.

On November 3, 2020, the U.S. Virgin Islands held a referendum on whether to convene a sixth constitutional convention. The proposal was approved with nearly 72% voting in favor.

=== Administrative divisions ===
Administratively, the U.S. Virgin Islands are divided into two districts: the St. Thomas and St. John district, and the St. Croix district. However, the U.S. Census Bureau divides each of the three main islands into three separate statistical entities (which are further divided into 20 subdistricts). Below is the U.S. Census Bureau's division model.

Districts and subdistricts of the U.S. Virgin Islands
Census County equivalents	St. Thomas	St. John	St. Croix
Subdistricts	1. Charlotte Amalie*; 2. East End; 3. Northside; 4. Southside; 5. Tutu; 6. Water Island; 7. West End	1. Central; 2. Coral Bay; 3. Cruz Bay; 4. East End	1. Anna's Hope Village; 2. Christiansted; 3. East End; 4. Frederiksted; 5. Northcentral; 6. Northwest; 7. Sion Farm; 8. Southcentral; 9. Southwest

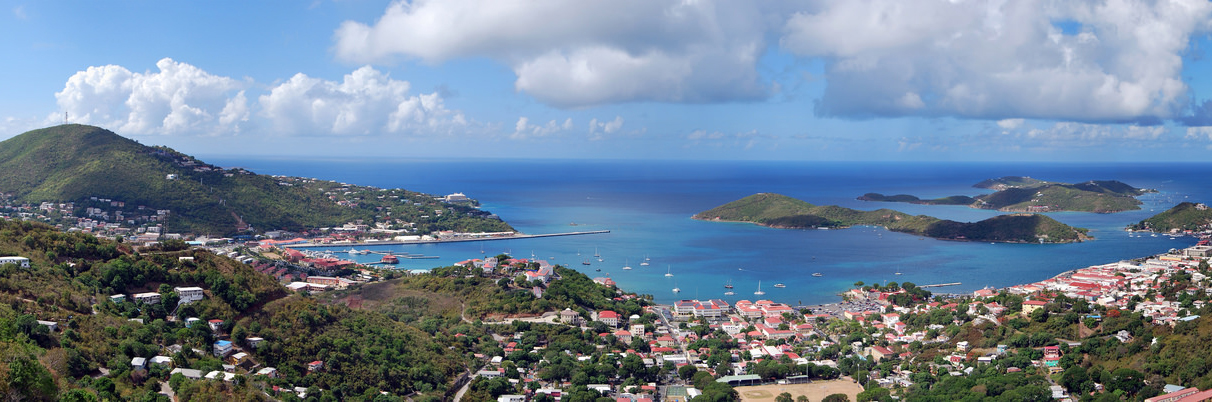
Charlotte Amalie, St. Thomas, the islands' historical capital and largest town in the US Virgin Islands

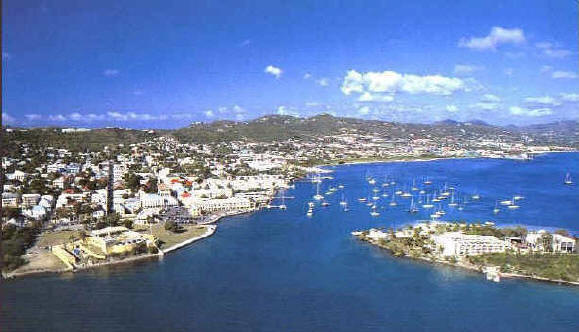
Christiansted, the largest town on St. Croix

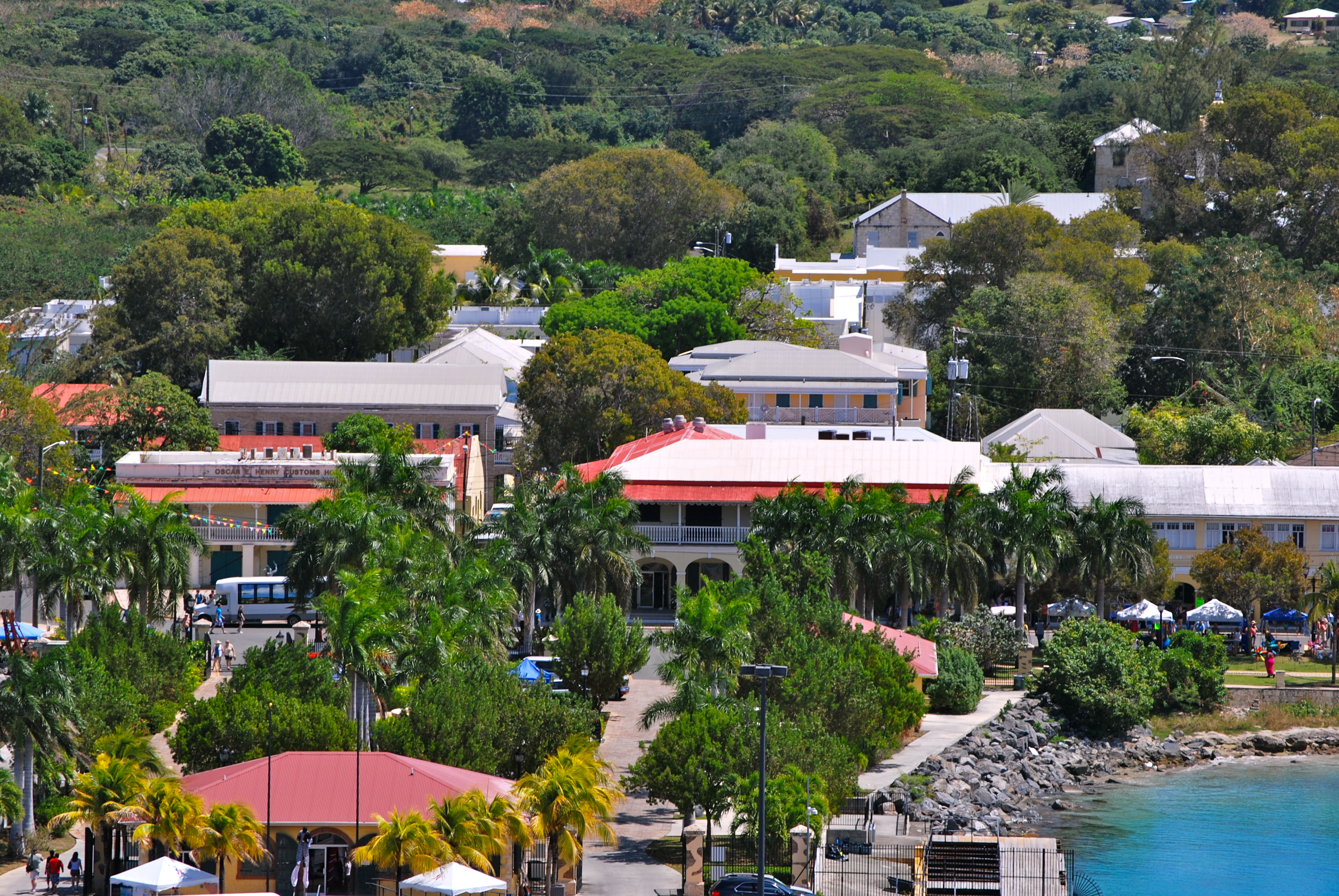
Frederiksted, the second town on St. Croix

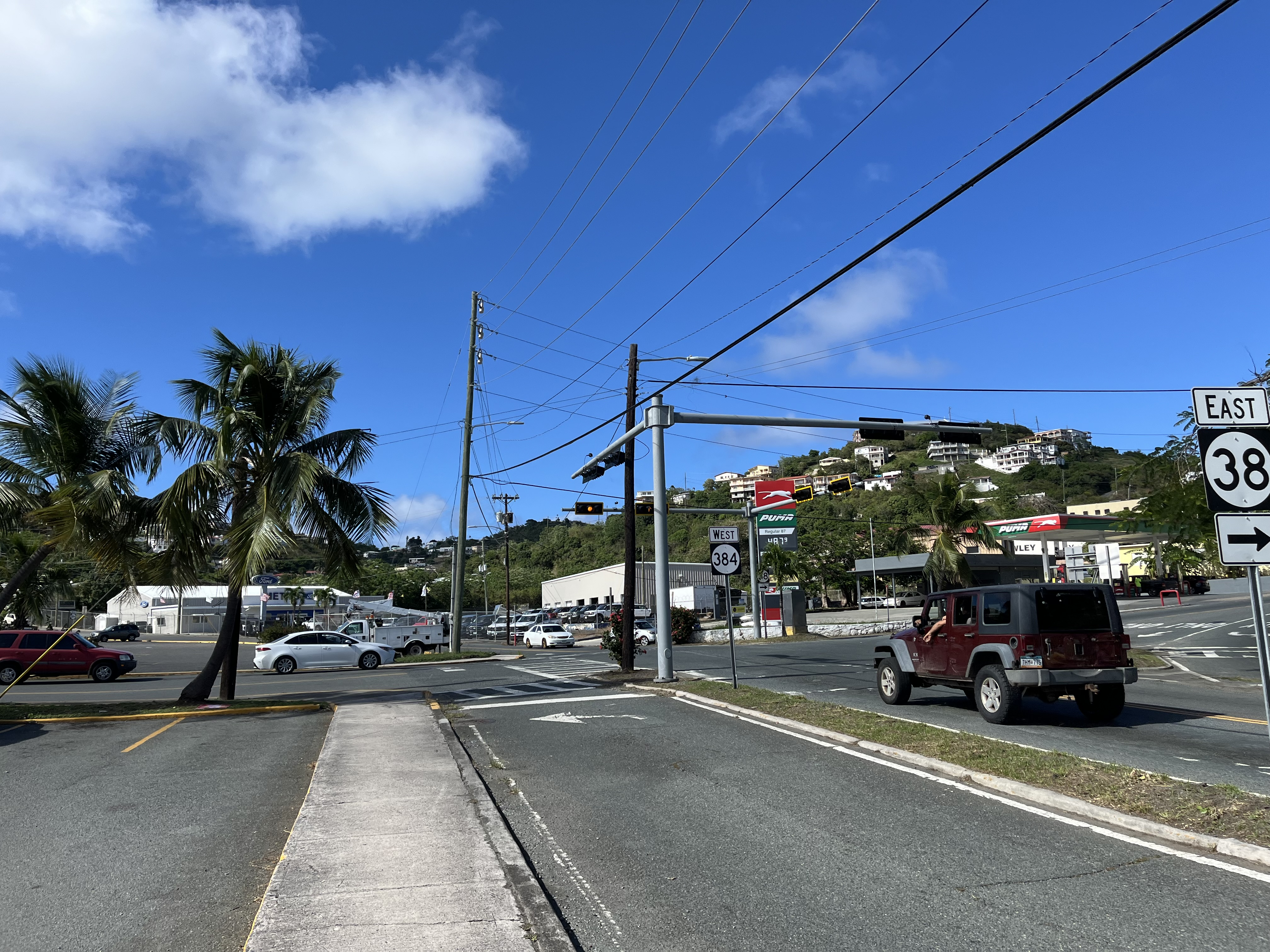
Anna's Retreat, the second largest town or CDP in the US Virgin Islands

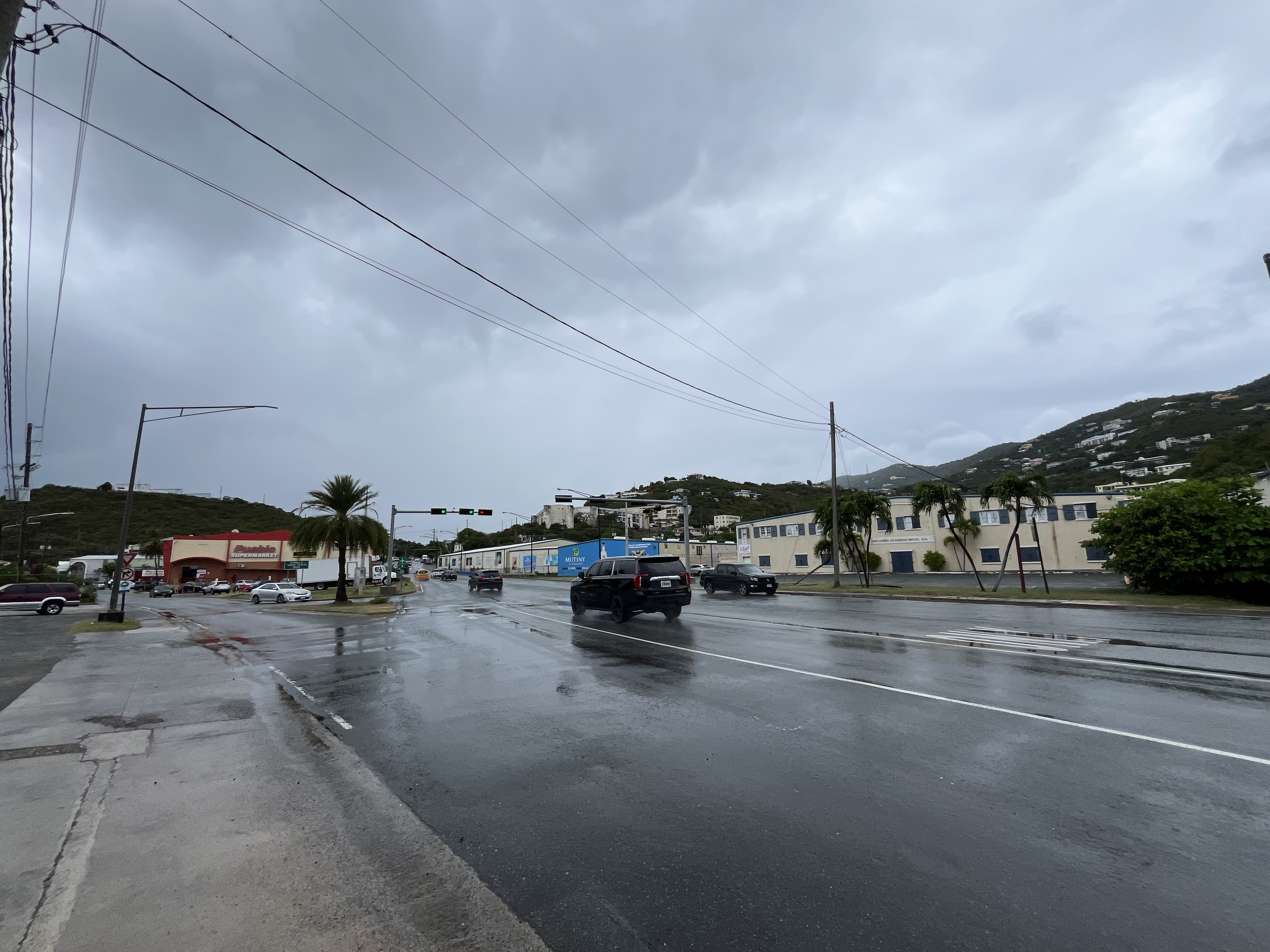
Charlotte Amalie West, the third largest town or CDP in the US Virgin Islands

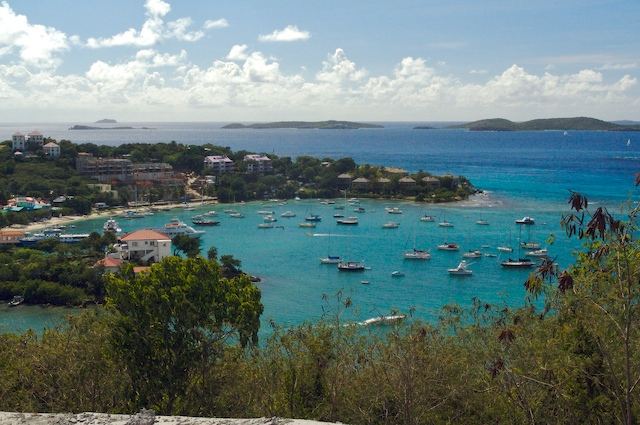
Cruz Bay, the fourth largest town or CDP in the US Virgin Islands and largest on St. John

Each of the three main islands of the U.S. Virgin Islands is counted as a county equivalent by the U.S. Census Bureau, with the following FIPS codes: 78010 for St. Croix, 78020 for St. John, and 78030 for St. Thomas.

While a Danish possession, the islands were divided into "quarters" (five on St. John and nine on St. Croix), which were further divided into many dozens of "estates". Estate names are still used to write addresses; estates and quarters are used in describing real estate, especially on St. John and St. Croix. More densely populated towns such as Frederiksted and Christiansted on St. Croix were historically referred to as "districts", in contrast to the surrounding plantation land.

All historic towns in the U.S. Virgin Islands meet all the following criteria:

1. were established during the Danish colonial period and served as key economic, administrative, and cultural centers. These towns have well-defined historic districts, often featuring colonial-era architecture, narrow streets, and landmarks that reflect their European influence. Many of these towns also have legal designations as historic areas, meaning preservation efforts are in place to maintain their cultural heritage.
2. have well established forts or other defensive structures, as they were vital for protecting against pirates, privateers, and enemy naval forces during the colonial period. These structures were built primarily during the Danish and earlier European colonial eras and played a key role in defending the islands' harbors, trade routes, and settlements.
3. were also named in honor of a Danish royal family member and their Main Street historically bore a Danish name that corresponds to the title of the royal family member for whom the town was name was named after.

- Charlotte Amalie - The town’s Main Street is named "Dronningens Gade" (Queen’s Street) in honor of the same queen.
- Christiansted (Christian Place) - Its Main Street is named King's Street (historically called "Kongens Gade"), reflecting the Danish monarchy, King Christian VI.
- Frederiksted (Frederik Place) - Its Main Street is named King's Street (historically called "Kongens Gade"), reflecting the Danish monarchy, King Frederik V.

Historical Towns in the United States Virgin Islands
Towns	Subdistrict(s)	Island (Census County Equivalent)	District (Administrative County Equivalent)	Population
Charlotte Amalie	Charlotte Amalie*	St. Thomas	St. Thomas - St. John	8194
Christiansted	Christiansted	St. Croix	St. Croix	1770
Frederiksted	Frederiksted	St. Croix	St. Croix	528

In contrast to the historical towns of the U.S. Virgin Islands, Census-Designated Places (CDPs) are modern statistical areas defined by the U.S. Census Bureau for demographic purposes. While CDPs in the U.S. Virgin Islands may have commercial hubs and residential developments, they do not necessarily have the same historical or administrative significance as the historical towns. CDPs in the U.S. Virgin Islands often represent suburban residential and commercial areas that grew in population and importance over time but were not formally established as towns during the Danish colonial period.

Census-Designated Places (CDPs) in the United States Virgin Islands
CDPs	Subdistrict(s)	Island (Census County Equivalent)	District (Administrative County Equivalent)	Population
Anna's Retreat	Tutu, Northside and Southside	St. Thomas	St. Thomas-St. John	5519
Charlotte Amalie West	Charlotte Amalie* and Northside	St. Thomas	St. Thomas-St. John	4404
Cruz Bay	Cruz Bay and Central	St. John	St. Thomas-St. John	2772
Charlotte Amalie East	Charlotte Amalie* and Southside	St. Thomas	St. Thomas-St. John	1908
Frederiksted Southeast	Frederiksted	St. Croix	St. Croix	1746
Coral Bay	Coral Bay and Central	St. John	St. Thomas-St. John	615
Red Hook	East End	St. Thomas	St. Thomas-St. John	225

*The subdistrict of Charlotte Amalie is sometimes referred to as "the City of Charlotte Amalie" or "the City".

=== Political status ===
A 1993 referendum on status attracted only 31.4% turnout, and so its results (in favor of the status quo) were considered void. No further status referendums have been scheduled since.

The territory is classified by the United Nations as a non-self-governing territory. In 2016, the United Nations' Special Committee on Decolonization recommended to the UN's General Assembly that this larger body should "actively pursue a public awareness campaign aimed at assisting the people of the United States Virgin Islands with their inalienable right to self-determination and in gaining a better understanding of the options for self-determination".

In March 2023, a poll conducted by Suffolk University among USVI residents revealed 63% supported the territory becoming a U.S. state while 23% opposed. Respondents were also asked about becoming an independent country, which 58% rejected the idea to 19% who agreed.

=== Military ===
Defense is the responsibility of the United States. There are some military facilities and personnel on the islands, supported by the U.S. government:

- United States Army Reserve
- Virgin Islands National Guard
  - Virgin Islands Air National Guard — stationed at St. Croix ANGS
  - Virgin Islands Army National Guard — stationed at St. Croix ANGS
  - Lionel A. Jackson Readiness Center — shared facility for Army and Air units

Although a public airport, Henry E. Rohlsen Airport has serviced aircraft from the United States Air Force, as well as the United States Army.

=== Law enforcement ===
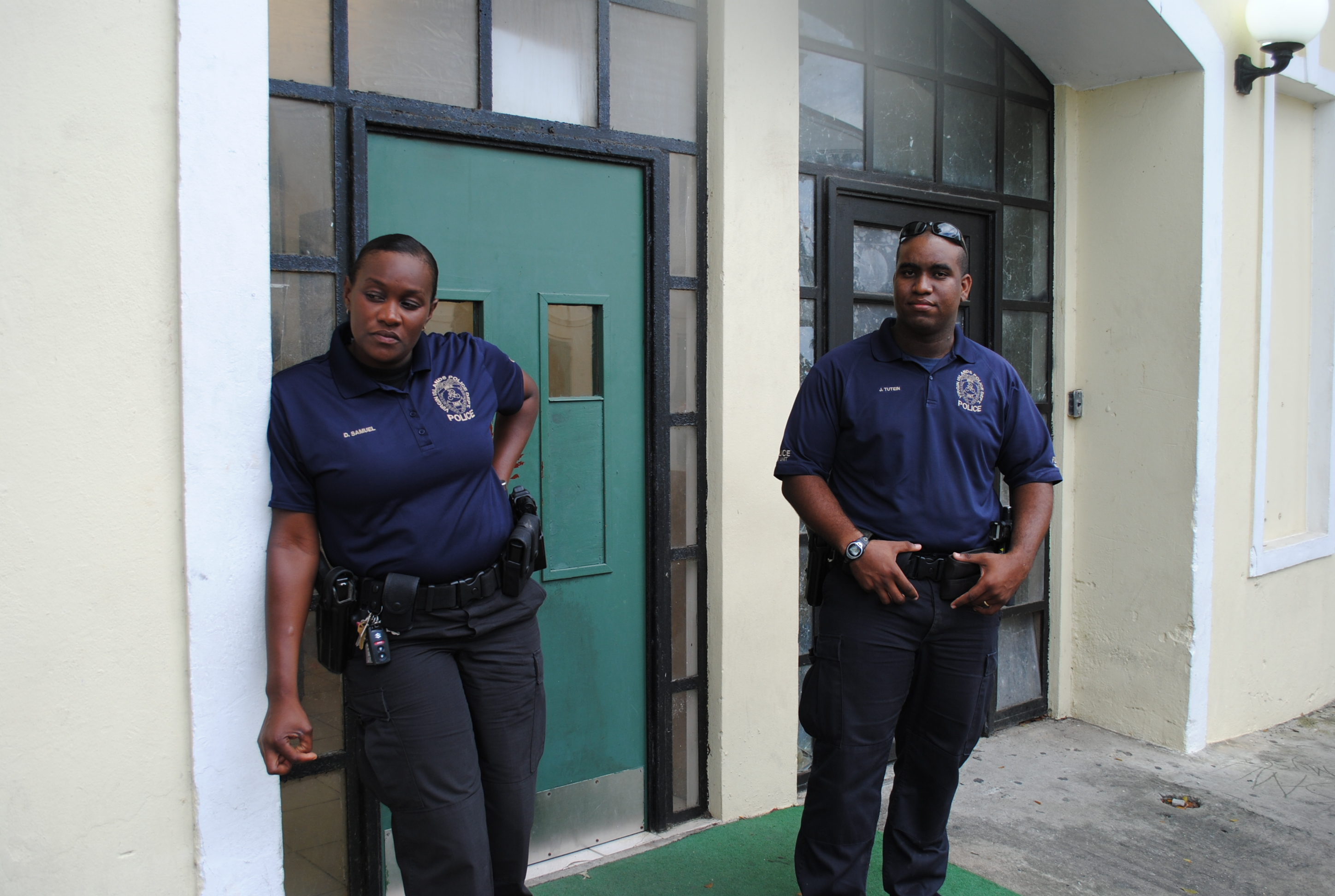
USVI police officers in 2012

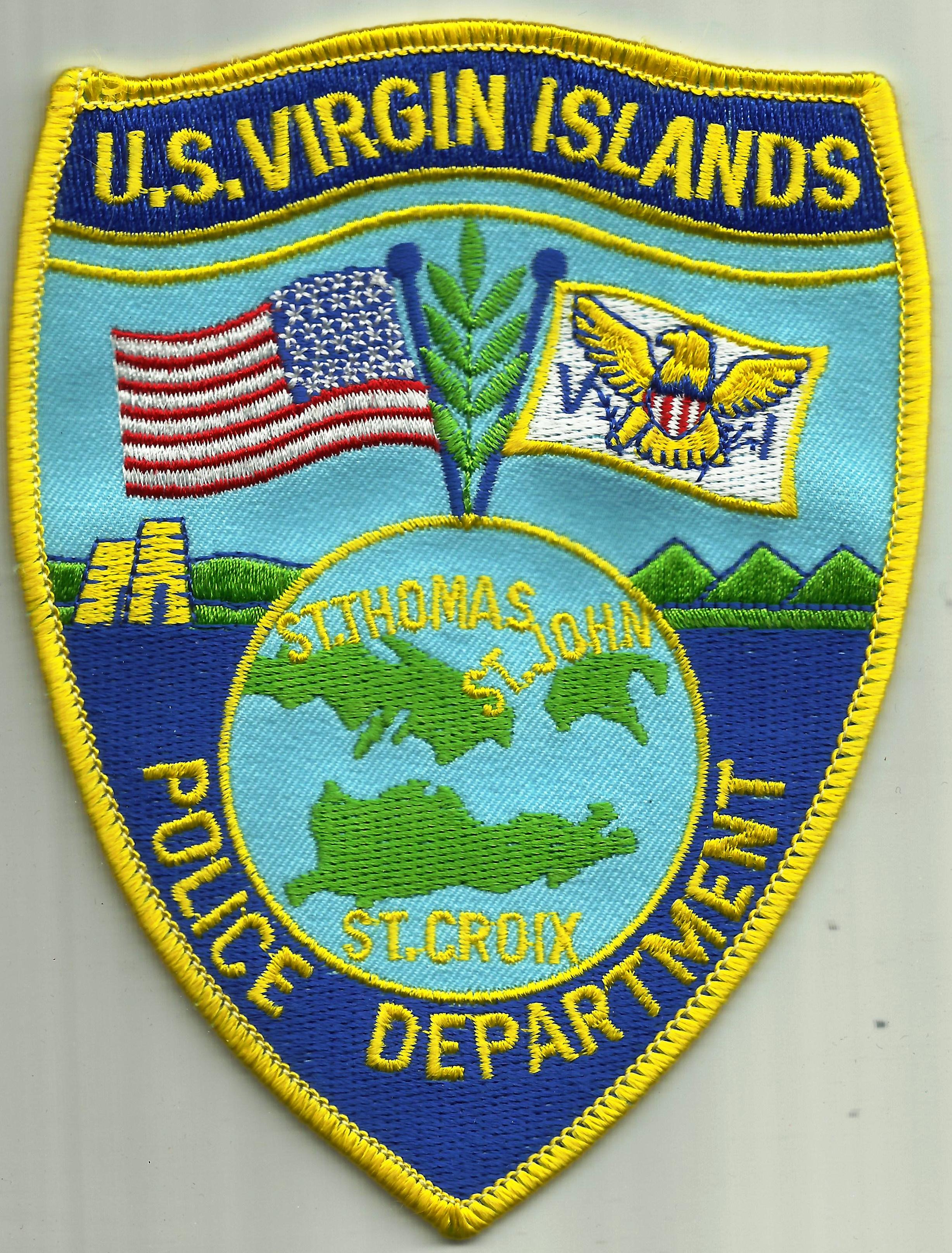
USVI police patch

Law enforcement services are provided by the United States Virgin Islands Police Department (USVIPD).

== Economy ==
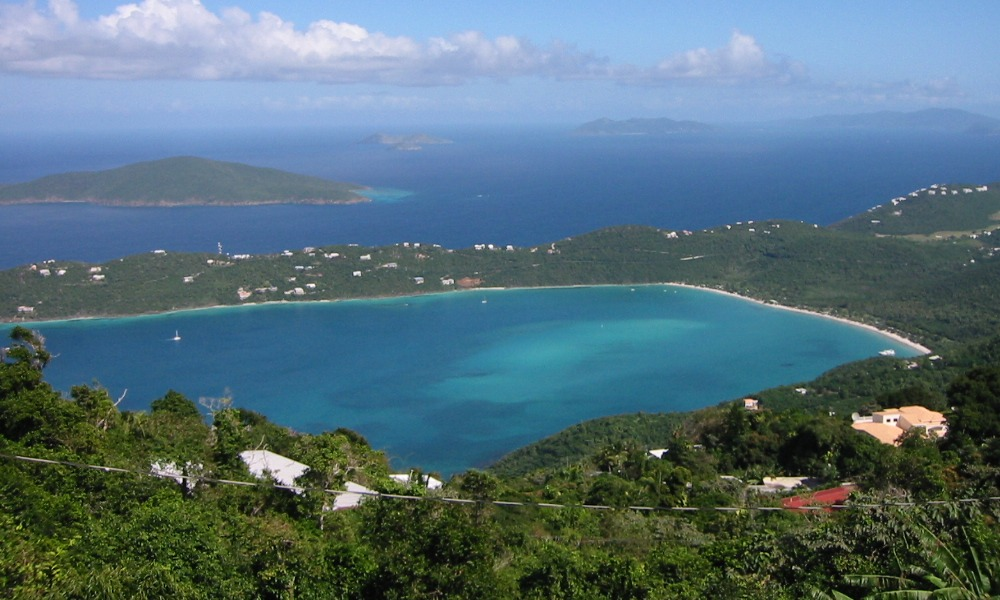
Magens Bay, St. Thomas

Tourism is the Islands' biggest industry; with 2.5–3 million annual visitors, the sector is responsible for about 60% of the GDP. Other major sectors are the public sector, some limited agriculture, and small scale manufacturing, most notably rum production.

A 2012 economic report from the U.S. Census Bureau indicated a total of 2,414 business establishments generating $6.8 billion in sales, employing 32,465 people and paying $1.1 billion in payroll per year. Between 2007 and 2012, sales declined by $12.6 billion, or 64.9 percent. (In 2007, total sales were $19.5 billion and the number employed was 35,300.)

According to a report on the first half of 2016 by the VI Bureau of Economic Research, the unemployment rate was 11.5 percent. In May 2016 the islands' Bureau of Economic Research indicated that there were 37,613 non-agricultural wage and salary jobs in the islands. This report states that the "leisure and hospitality sector" employed an average of 7,333 people. The retail trade sector, which also serves many tourists, averaged another 5,913 jobs. Other categories which also include some tourism jobs include arts and entertainment (792 jobs), accommodation and food (6,541 jobs), accommodation (3,755 jobs), and food services and drink (2,766 jobs). A large percentage of the 37,613 non-farm workers are employed in dealing with tourists. Serving the local population is also part of the role of these sectors.

In a May 2016 report, some 11,000 people were categorized as being involved in some aspect of agriculture in the first half of 2016, but this category makes up a small part of the total economy. At that time, there were approximately 607 manufacturing jobs and 1,487 natural resource and construction jobs. The single largest employer was the government. In mid-February 2017, the USVI was facing a financial crisis due to a very high debt level of $2 billion and a structural budget deficit of $110 million. Since January 2017, the U.S. Virgin Islands government has been unable to raise financing from the bond market at favorable interest rates, and as of June 2019 have not issued any new bonds since then.

=== Personal income ===
The median income for a household in the territory was $40,408, and the median income for a family was $52,000 according to the 2020 census. Males had a median income of $41,747 versus $37,052 for females. The per capita income for the territory was $26,897. The average private sector salary was $34,088 and the average public sector salary was $52,572. About 28.7% of families and 32.5% of the population were below the poverty line, including 41.7% of those less than 18 years old and 29.8% of those 65 or more years old. Nearly 70% of adults had at least a high school diploma and 19.2% had a bachelor's degree or higher.

=== Financial challenges ===
Analysts reviewing the economy often point to the closure of the HOVENSA oil refinery, the islands' largest private sector employer, in early 2012 as having a major negative impact on the territory's economy. In late 2013, the Federal Reserve Bank of New York's Research and Statistics Group pointed out that manufacturing employment dropped by 50% in May 2012 and by another 4% by November 2012, and that the GDP fell by 13%, "mainly due to an 80% drop-off in exports (mostly refined petroleum)". On the other hand, tourism and some other service industries were growing. As well, the 2010 census indicated that a relatively high share of the adult population is in the labor force: 66%, versus 65% on the mainland and well above 50% in Puerto Rico.

A May 2016 report by Bloomberg expressed concern about the islands' tax-supported debt load. By January 23, 2017, this had increased to $2 billion. That translated to a per capita debt of $19,000, which was higher than the per capita debt in Puerto Rico which was undergoing a severe financial crisis at the time. A Debtwire analyst writing in Forbes indicated that nothing short of a miracle would prevent a financial collapse. Another area of concern was the structural budget deficit which was at $110 million in mid February 2017. The government instituted a new law in March 2017 with new or increased taxes on rum, beer, tobacco products and sugary drinks, as well as internet purchases and timeshare unit owners.

=== Tourism ===
Tourist arrivals of 2024 in %

Tourism, trade, and other service-oriented industries are the primary economic activities, accounting for nearly 60% of the GDP. Approximately 2.5 million tourists per year visit, most arriving on cruise ships. Such visitors do not spend large amounts of money ($146.70 each on average) but as a group, they contributed $339.8 million to the economy in 2012. Euromonitor indicates that over 50% of the workforce is employed in some tourism-related work.

Additionally, the islands frequently are a starting point for private yacht charters to the neighboring British Virgin Islands.

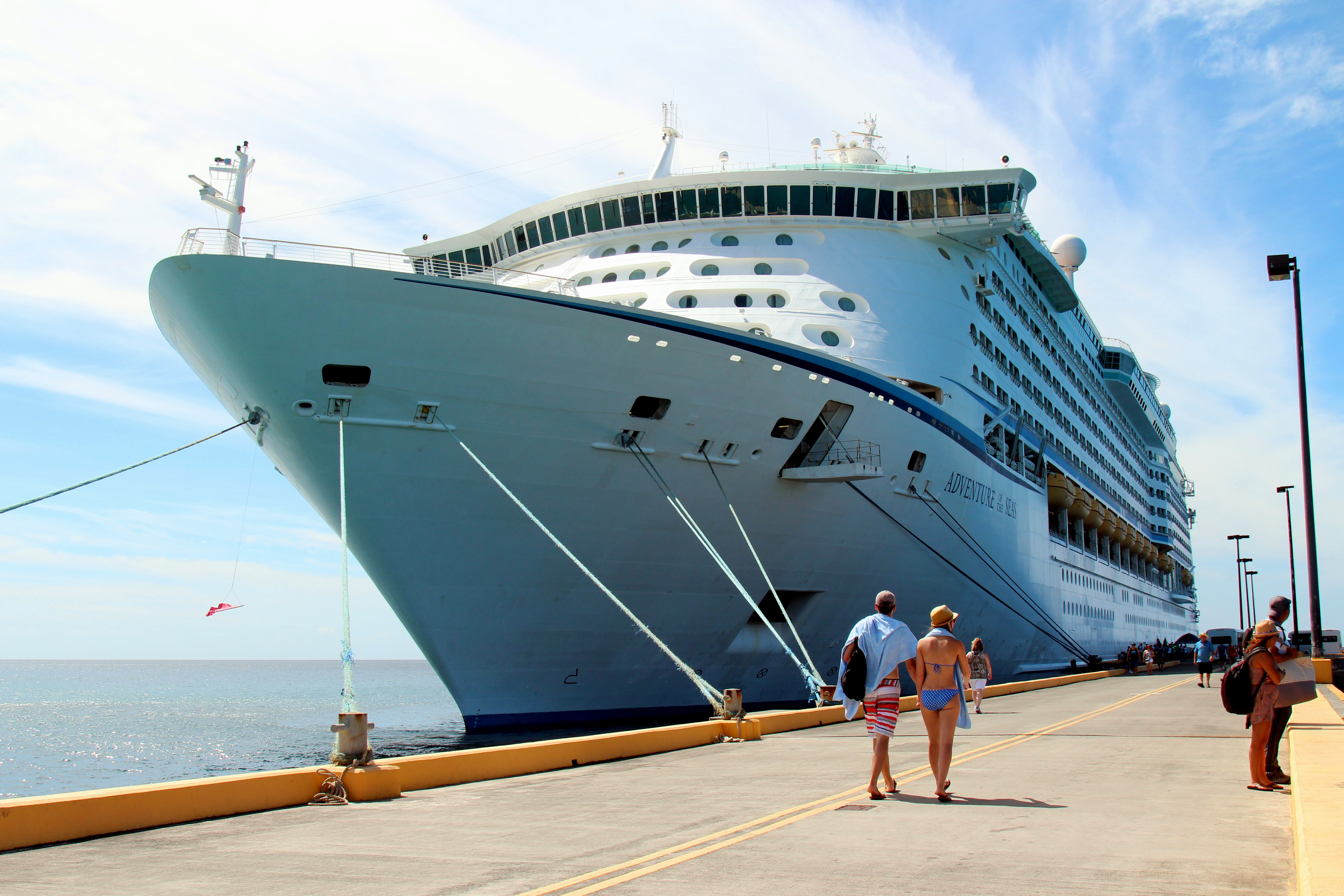
RCCL Adventure Of The Seas

=== Other sectors ===
The manufacturing sector consists of mainly rum distilling. The agricultural sector is small, with most food being imported. International business and services in the financial sector are a small but growing component of the economy. Most energy is also generated from imported oil, leading to electricity costs four to five times higher than the U.S. mainland. The Virgin Islands were the highest oil consumers per capita in the world in 2007. The Virgin Islands Water and Power Authority also uses imported energy to operate its desalination facilities to provide fresh water.

=== Government ===
The CIA World Factbook lists the value of federal programs and grants — $241.4 million in 2013, 19.7% of the territory's total revenues — and that "the economy remains relatively diversified. Along with the tourist industry, it appears that rum exports, trade, and services will be major income sources in future years".

=== Tax and trade ===
The U.S. Virgin Islands are an independent customs territory from the mainland United States and operate largely as a free port. U.S. citizens thus do not have to clear customs when arriving in the U.S. Virgin Islands, but do when traveling to the mainland. Local residents are not subject to US federal income taxes on U.S. Virgin Islands source income; they pay taxes to the territory equal to what their federal taxes would be if they lived in a state.

In 2014, the territory is considered as a tax haven. In 2018, the EU added it on the European Union tax haven blacklist.

=== Transport and communications ===
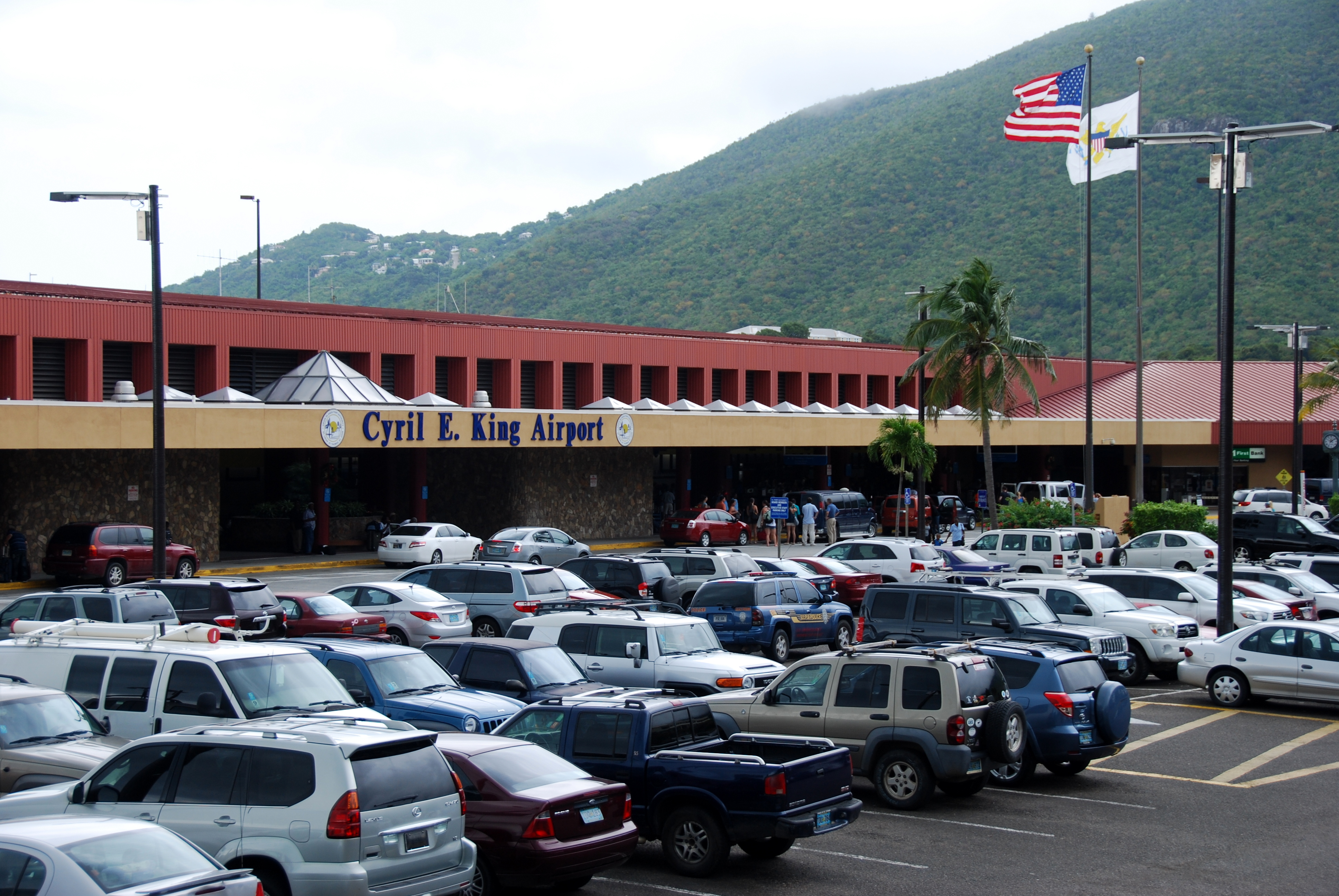
Cyril E. King Airport on St Thomas

The Henry E. Rohlsen International Airport serves St. Croix and the Cyril E. King Airport serves St. Thomas and St. John.

The U.S. Virgin Islands is the only U.S. jurisdiction that drives on the left. This was inherited from what was then-current practice on the islands at the time of the 1917 transfer of the territory to the United States from Denmark. However, because most cars in the territory are imported from the mainland United States, the cars in the territory are left-hand drive. However, not all U.S. vehicle regulations are in force, and there are vehicles on the road that cannot be sold in the mainland United States. Additionally, headlights use the U.S. pattern which casts light to the right, tending to blind oncoming drivers. Traffic signals are located on the opposite side of the road than they are in the U.S. mainland, and many standard road signs have been altered to fit the left-side driving.

==== Public transportation ====
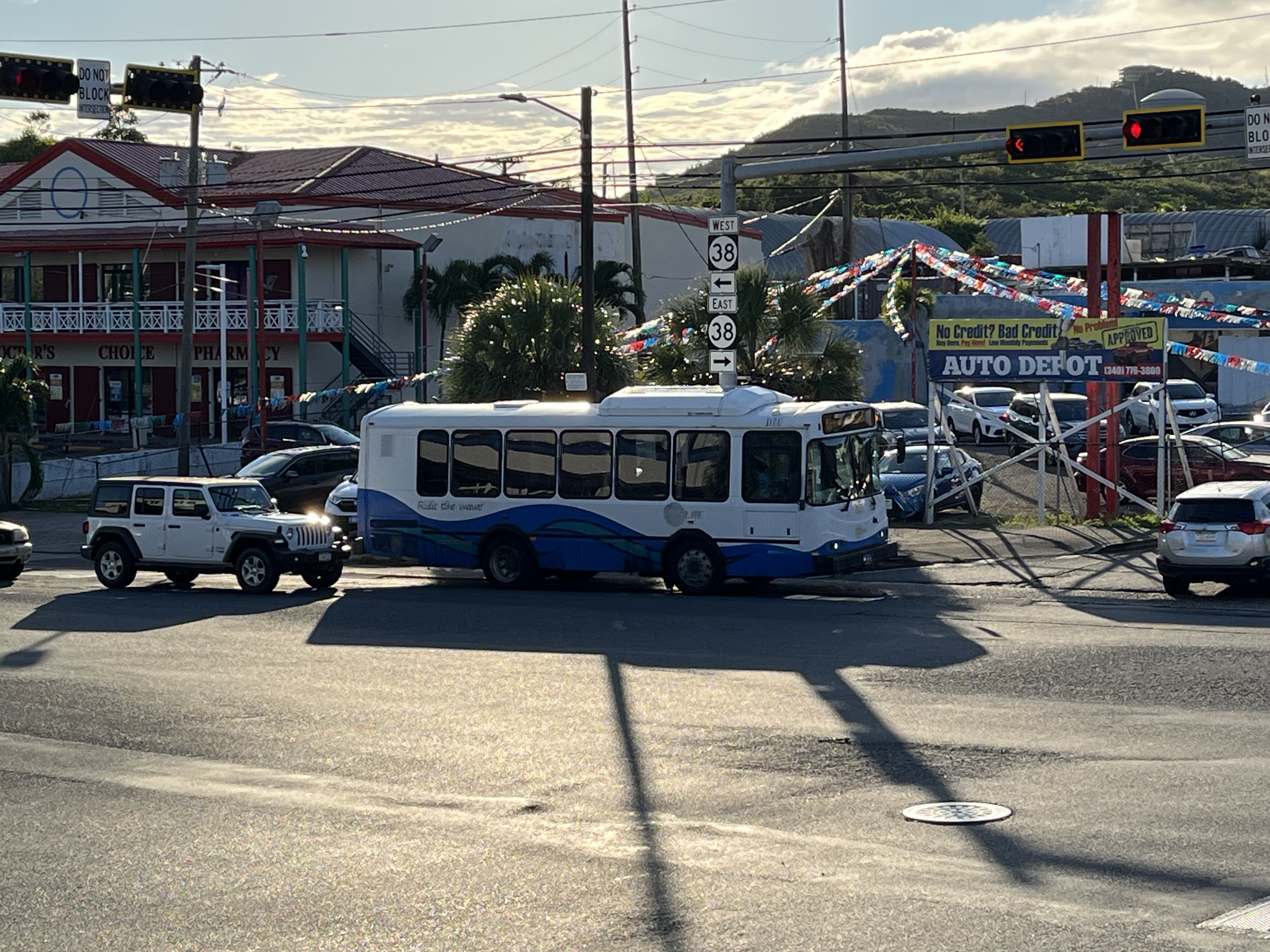
VITRAN bus on St Thomas near TuTu Park Mall.

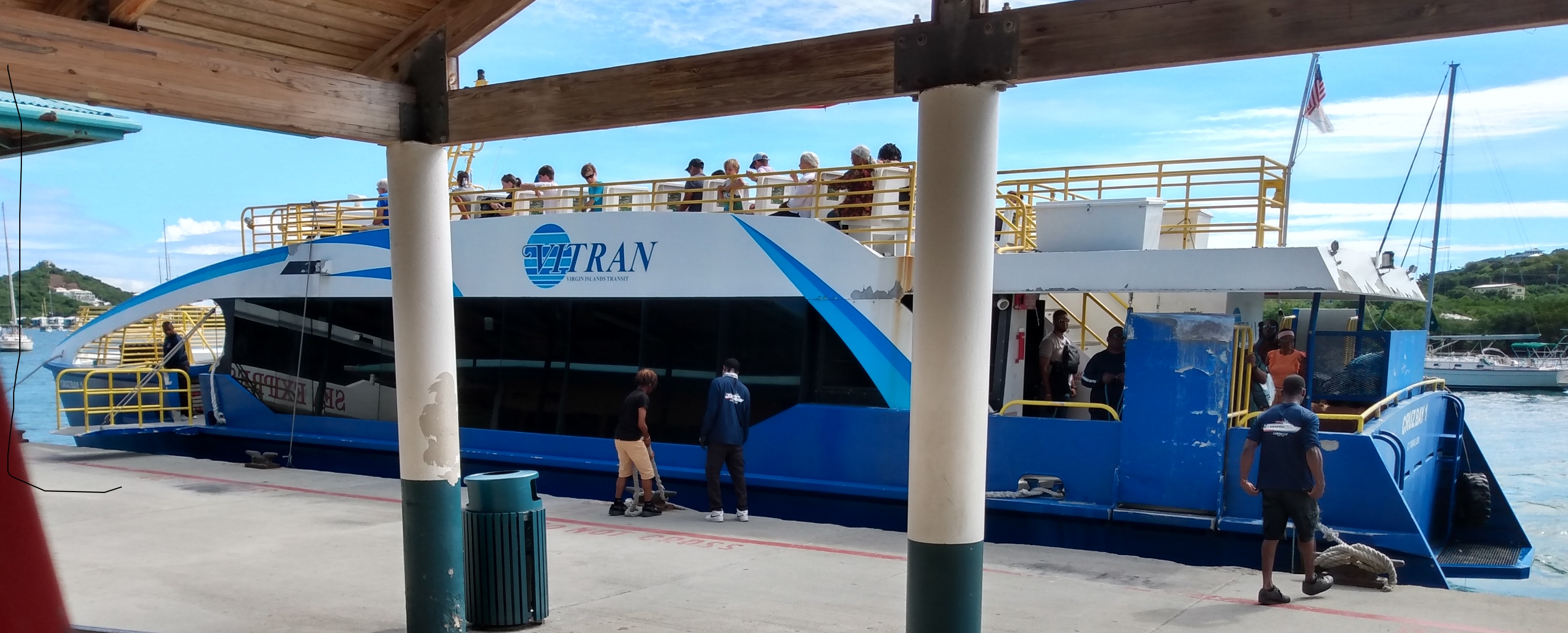
VITRAN Ferry, Cruz Bay 1, docking at the Urman Victor Fredericks Marine Terminal in Red Hook, St. Thomas

The VITRAN (Virgin Island Public Transit) system is a comprehensive public transportation system serving the U.S. Virgin Islands. It provides accessible public transportation across the major islands of St. Croix, St. John and St. Thomas. The system encompasses various modes of transportation, including buses, paratransit services and ferries connecting major towns, tourist destinations, transportation hubs, and islands.

==== Mail Service ====
Mail service is handled by the United States Postal Service, using the two-character state code "VI" for domestic mail delivery. ZIP codes are in the 008xx range. As of January 2010, specifically assigned codes include 00801–00805 (St Thomas), 00820–00824 (Christiansted), 00830–00831 (St. John), 00840–00841 (Frederiksted), and 00850–00851 (Kingshill). The islands are part of the North American Numbering Plan, using area code 340, and island residents and visitors are able to call most toll-free U.S. numbers.

The U.S. Virgin Islands are located in the Atlantic Standard Time zone and do not participate in daylight saving time. When the mainland United States is on standard time, the U.S. Virgin Islands are one hour ahead of Eastern Standard Time. When the mainland United States is on daylight saving time, Eastern Daylight Time is the same as Atlantic Standard Time.

== Demographics ==
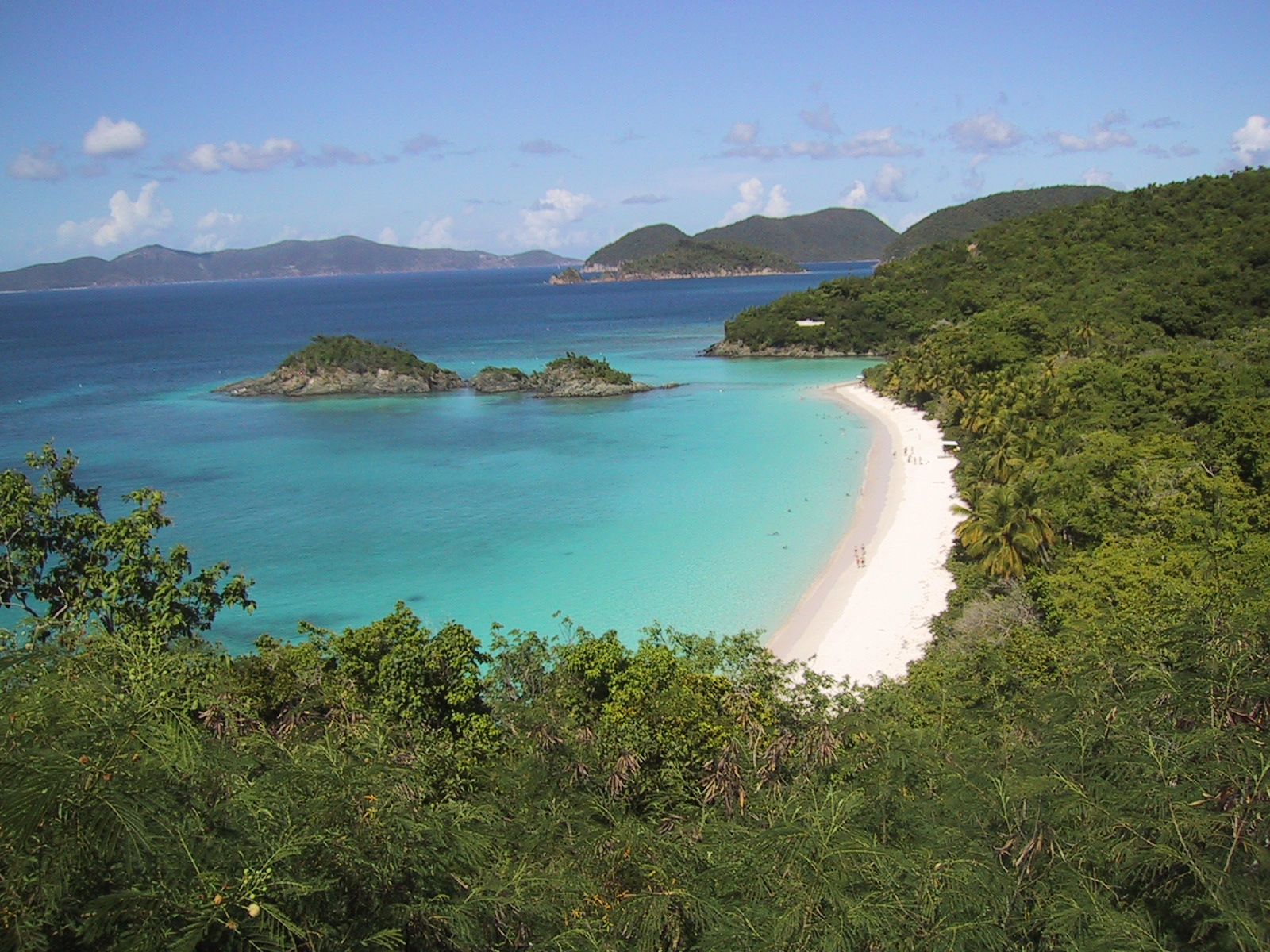
Trunk Bay, St. John

Historical population
Census	Pop.	Note	%±
1970	62,468		—
1980	96,569		54.6%
1990	101,809		5.4%
2000	108,612		6.7%
2010	106,405		−2.0%
2020	87,146		−18.1%

In 2020, the census put the population of the U.S. Virgin Islands at 87,146, a decline of 18,989 (-18.1%) from 2010.

In 2020, there were 39,642 households, out of which 24.1% had children under the age of 18 living with them, 27.8% were married couples living together, 20.5% had a female householder with no husband present, and 45.1% were non-families. 40.1% of all households were made up of individuals, and 16.4% had someone living alone who was 65 years of age or older. The average household size was 2.14 and the average family size was 2.98.

In the territory, 19.6% of the population in 2020 was under the age of 18, 8.0% was from 18 to 24, 27.1% from 25 to 44, 24.9% from 45 to 64, and 8.4% was 65 years of age or older. The median age was 33 years. For every 100 females, there were 91.4 males. For every 100 females ages 18 and up, there were 87.7 males. The annual population growth is −0.12%.

The literacy rate for the adult population was 94.9% in 2010.

=== Ethnic groups ===
The racial makeup of the U.S. Virgin Islands as of the 2020 United States census:

- Black or Afro-Caribbean: 71.4% (64.2% Non-Hispanic Black)
- Hispanic or Latino of any race: 17.4% (8.9% Puerto Rican, 6.2% Dominican)
- White: 16.6% (12.7% Non-Hispanic Whites)
- Other: 3.6%
- Mixed: 7.4%
- Asian or Asian Caribbean: 1.0%

Many residents can trace their ancestry to other Caribbean islands, especially Puerto Rico and the Lesser Antilles. The territory is largely Afro-Caribbean in origin.

=== Languages ===
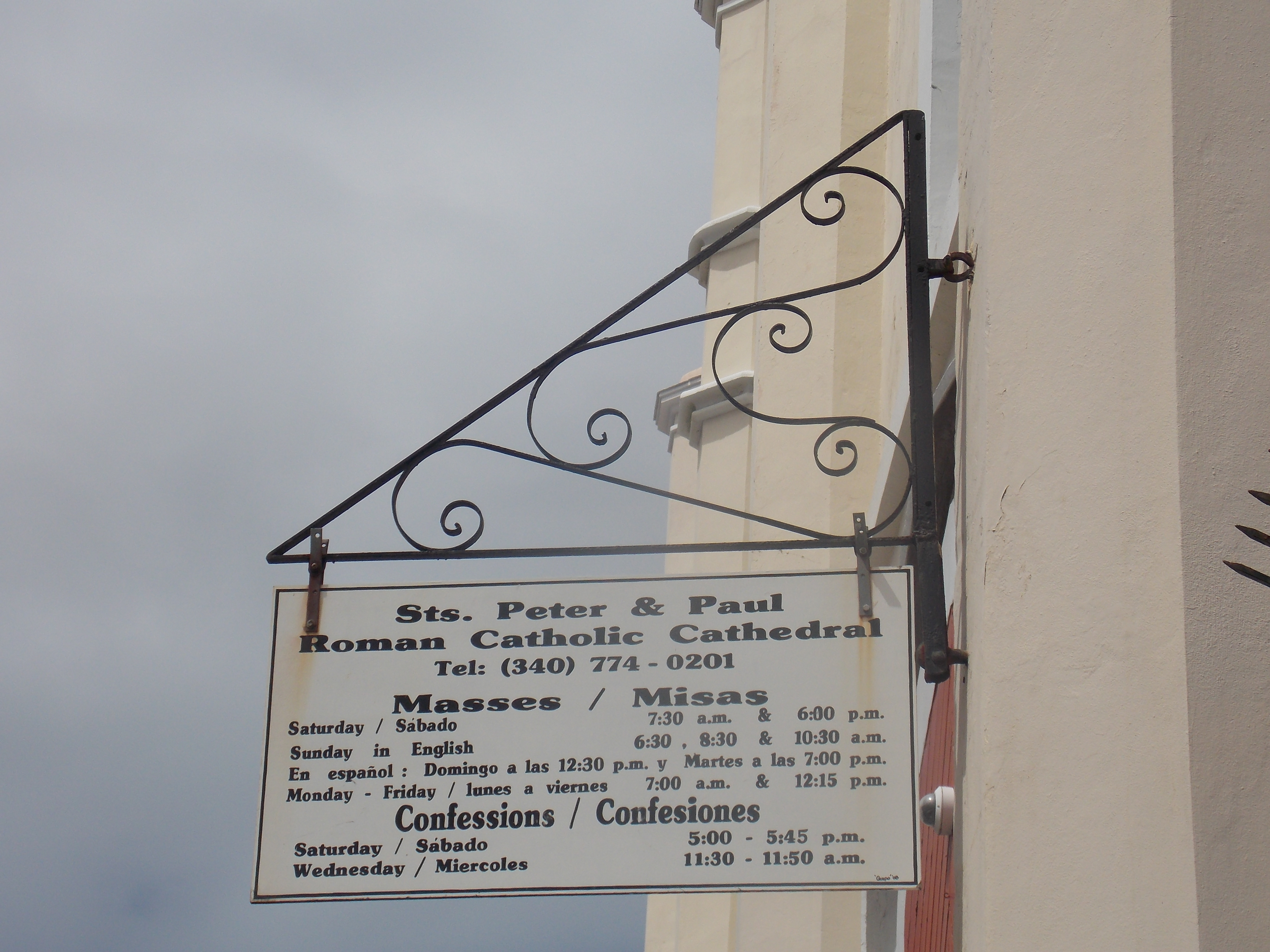
English and Spanish sign at the Catholic Cathedral of Saints Peter and Paul

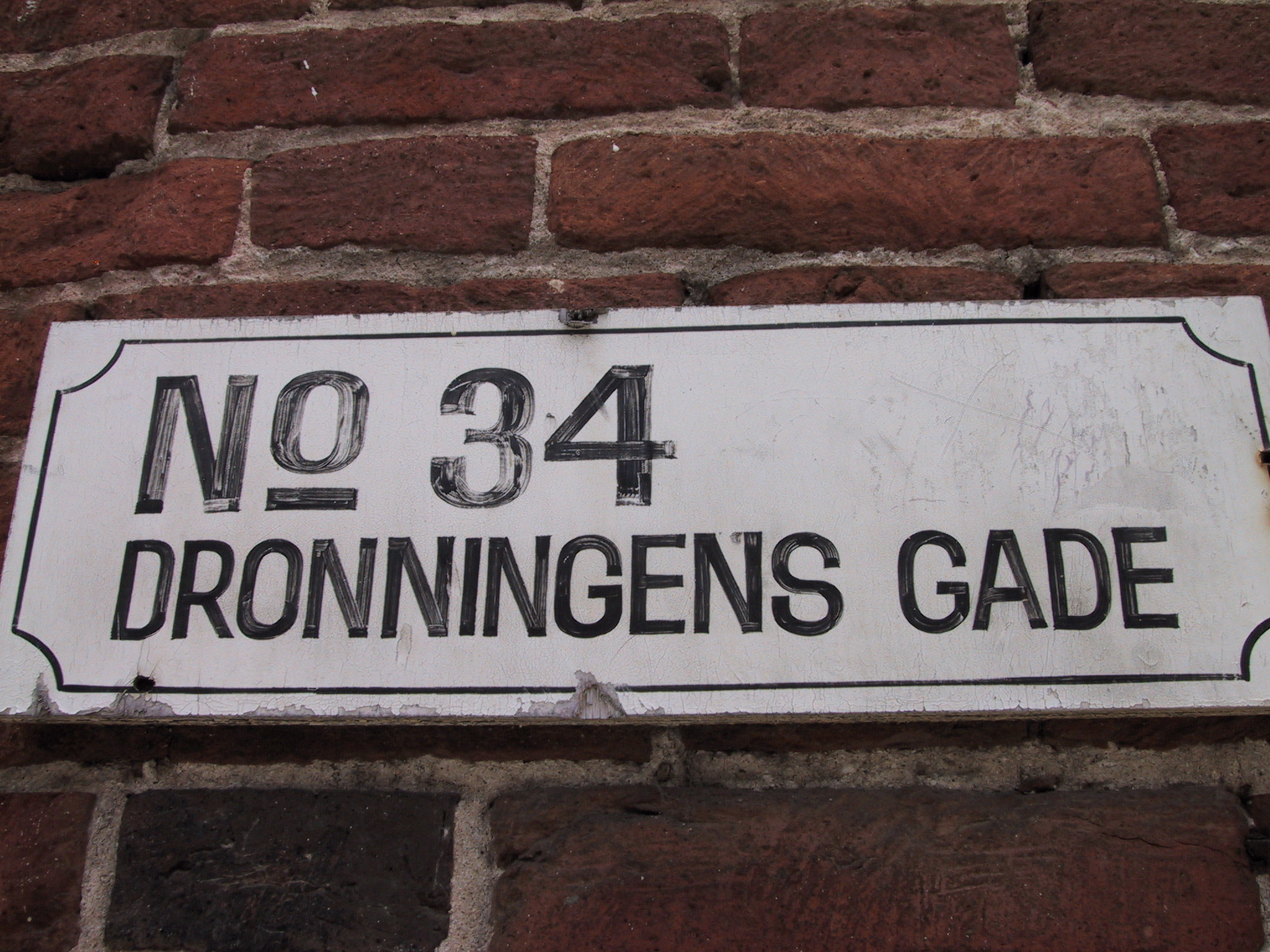
A Danish street name in Charlotte-Amalie

English is the predominant language of the territory. In 2010, Spanish was spoken by 17.2% of the population aged five and older; French or French Creole was spoken by 8.6%, and other languages were spoken by 2.5%.

Virgin Islands Creole English, an English-based creole locally known as "dialect", is spoken in informal situations. The form of Virgin Islands Creole spoken on St. Croix, known as Crucian, is slightly different from that spoken on St. Thomas and St. John. Because the U.S. Virgin Islands are home to thousands of immigrants from across the Caribbean, Spanish and various French creole languages are also widely spoken. Spanish is mostly spoken by Puerto Ricans in St. Croix; Puerto Rican migration was prevalent in the 1930s, '40s and '50s, when many Puerto Ricans relocated to St. Croix for work after the collapse of the sugar industry. In addition, the U.S. Navy purchase of two-thirds of the nearby Puerto Rican island of Vieques during World War II resulted in the displacement of thousands of Viequenses, many of whom relocated to St. Croix because of its similar size and geography. Puerto Ricans in St. Croix, most of whom have lived on the island for more than a generation, have kept their culture alive while integrating it into the native Crucian culture and society. For example, in informal situations, many Puerto Ricans in St. Croix speak a unique Spanglish-like combination of Puerto Rican Spanish and the local Crucian dialect of creole English.

English has been the predominant language since 1917, when the islands were transferred from Denmark to the United States. Under Danish rule, the official language was Danish, but it was solely the language of administration and spoken by Danes, a tiny minority of the overall population that primarily occupied administrative roles in colonial Danish West Indian society. Place names of Denmark–Norway origin are still common, such as Christiansted, which is named after King Christian VI of Denmark–Norway. Although the U.S. Virgin Islands was a Danish possession during most of its colonial history, Danish never was a spoken language among the populace, black or non-Danish white, as the majority of plantation and slave owners were of Dutch, English, Scottish, Irish, or Spanish descent.

Even during Danish ownership, Dutch, another Germanic language like Danish, was more common, at least during some of those 245 years, specifically on St. Thomas and St. John, where the majority of the European settlers were Dutch. In St. Croix, English was the dominant language. St. Croix was owned by the French until 1733 when the island was sold to the Danish West Indian and Guinea Company. By 1741, there were five times as many English settlers on the island as Danes. English Creole emerged on St. Croix more so than the Dutch Creole, which was more popular on St. Thomas and St. John. Negerhollands, a Dutch-based creole language, was formerly spoken on St. John, St. Croix, and St. Thomas. The creole emerged on plantations in the late 17th century or early 18th century; but its prevalence began to decline in the early-mid 19th century as the usage of English and Virgin Islands Creole English increased. The last speaker of Negerhollands died in 1987, and the language is now considered extinct. Other languages spoken in the Danish West Indies included Irish, Scots, Spanish, and French, as well as Virgin Islands English Creole.

=== Religion ===
Religion in the United States Virgin Islands (2010)
1. Protestantism (65.5%)
2. Catholicism (27.1%)
3. Other Christian (1.80%)
4. Unaffiliated (3.70%)
5. Other religion (1.90%)

Christianity is the dominant religion in the U.S. Virgin Islands. According to Pew Research Center, 94.8% of the population was Christian in 2010. The largest Christian denominations in the 2010 census were Baptist, Catholic, and Episcopal.

Owing to both their Danish past and American present, Protestantism on the islands has long been widespread. It was first introduced when Lutheranism was brought to the islands in the Danish colonization. The Danish crown also allowed other religious traditions on the islands including Anglicanism, Catholicism, the Moravian Church and other Protestant groups. Historically, St. Thomas and St. Croix are known for missionary efforts undertaken by the Moravian missionaries. They were allowed on the islands by the Danish royal court, but came under scrutiny when they denounced slavery. A number of neo-Protestant traditions including Pentecostalism, various evangelical Protestants and the Seventh-day Adventists arrived later with the switch of allegiance from Denmark to the United States.

There is also a strong Catholic presence. Rastafari is also prevalent. St. Thomas is home to one of the oldest Jewish communities in the Western Hemisphere, as Sephardi Jews began to settle the island in the 18th century as traders and merchants. The St. Thomas Synagogue in Charlotte Amalie is the second-oldest synagogue on American soil, and oldest in terms of continuous usage. Hinduism and Islam are practiced by the Indo-Caribbean and Indian (mostly Sindhi Indian) population. There is one Hindu temple in La Grande Princesse, St. Croix, and another in Frenchman's Bay, St. Thomas. There is also a Buddhist temple located on the island of St. Thomas.

=== Education ===
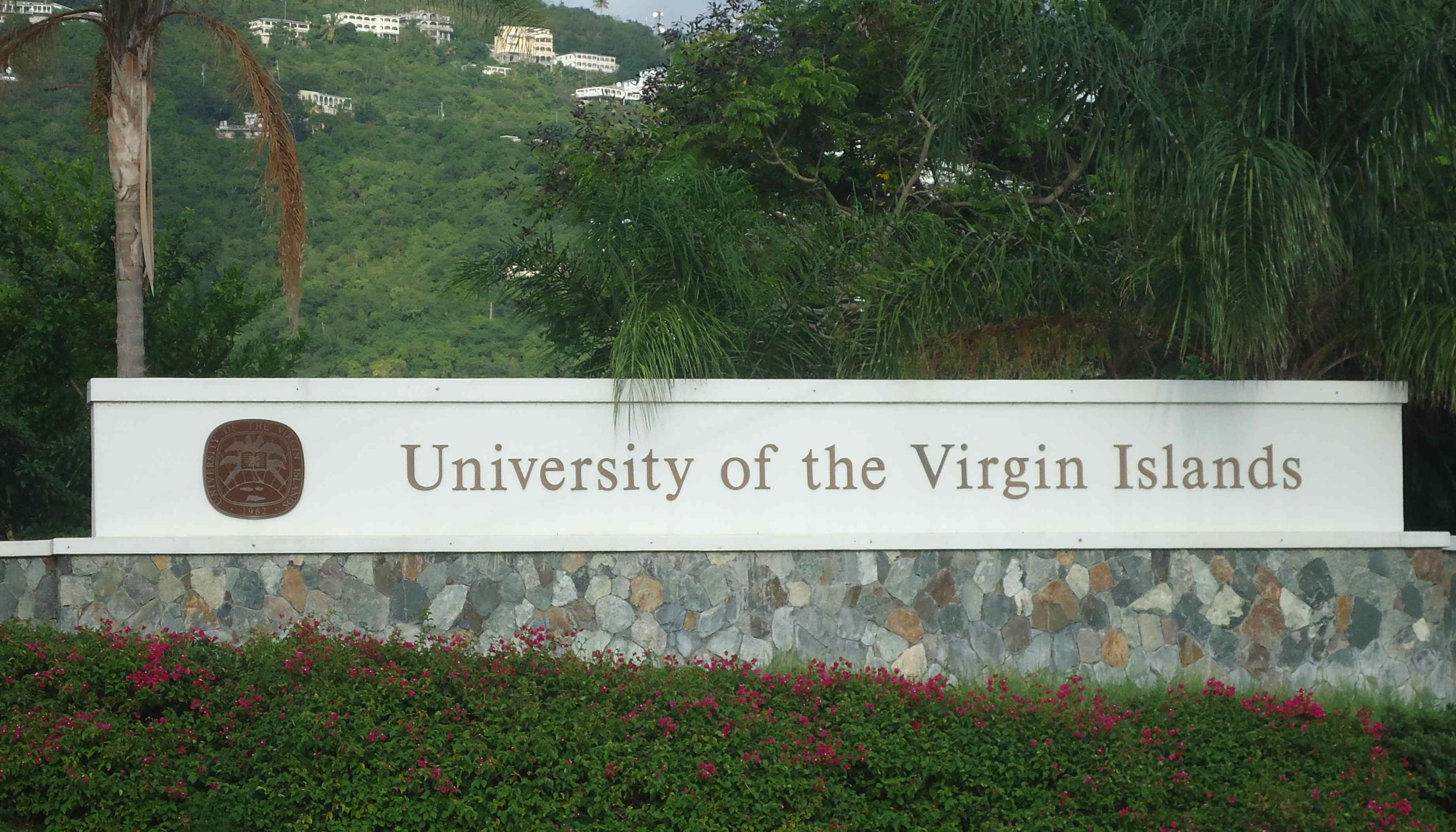
Entrance sign

The United States Virgin Islands Department of Education serves as the territory's education agency, and has two school districts: St. Thomas-St. John School District and St. Croix School District.

The University of the Virgin Islands provides higher education leading to associate's, bachelor's, master's and PhD degrees, with campuses on St. Thomas and St. Croix.

=== Health ===
In 2010, the territory's average life expectancy was 79.61 years. It was 76.57 years for men and 82.83 for women.

== Culture ==
The culture of the Virgin Islands reflects the various people that have inhabited the present-day U.S. Virgin Islands and British Virgin Islands, which despite their political separation have kept close cultural ties. The culture derives chiefly from West African, European and American traditions, in addition to the influences from the immigrants from the Arab world, India and other Caribbean islands. The islands were strongly influenced by the British, Dutch, French and Danish during the long periods the islands were under these powers.

=== Media ===
The islands have a number of AM and FM radio stations (mostly on St. Thomas and St. Croix) broadcasting music, religious, and news programming. (See List of radio stations in US Territories.) Full- and low-power television stations are split between St. Thomas and St. Croix. (See List of television stations in the U.S. Virgin Islands.) Newspapers include:

- St. Croix Avis, printed weekly between 1844 and 2024
- The Virgin Islands Daily News, printed daily on St. Thomas
- St. John Tradewinds, distributed weekly on St. John
- St. Thomas – St. John This Week (online only)
- St. Thomas Source (online only)
- St. Croix Source (online only)
- St. John On Island Times, news and information on St. John, USVI
- The Virgin Islands Consortium (online only)

=== Libraries ===
Soon after becoming a US territory in 1917, the first public library was formally accepted as a gift from the Junior Red Cross. The St. Thomas Library opened in December 1920. The library occupied rented quarters and frequently moved. The Carnegie Corporation of New York provided grant funding from 1929 through 1933 to the US Virgin Islands for the development of library services by sending librarians, funding for books, and training for the supervising librarian.

An early and enduring pioneer for libraries in the Virgin Islands was Enid M. Baa. Ms. Baa was one of the four first high school graduates in St. Thomas and participated in the establishment of the first high school library. Soon after her graduation, Ms. Baa was selected by the Carnegie Foundation and Governor Pearson for a scholarship as a special student to the Graduate Library School at Hampton Institute. After graduating from the program in 1933, Ms. Baa returned to the Virgin Islands to be appointed by Governor Pearson as Supervising Librarian for the Virgin Islands. She was the first woman to hold a cabinet-level office in the Virgin Islands government. In 1943, Ms. Baa returned to the United States to complete her studies at Columbia University and worked in the library field in the United States. Among the positions she held include Head of Serial Cataloging Section at the United Nations Library and Specialist in Cataloging of Spanish or Portuguese materials at the New York Public Library. In 1954, Ms. Baa was appointed Director of Libraries and Museums under Governor Archibald Alexander. She received the John Jay Whitney Foundation Fellowship in 1955 on the basis of her contribution to the preservation of the Sephardic Jewish Records of the Virgin Islands and the re-indexing of these records in a card file. The family records of US senator Judah P. Benjamin, artist Camille Pissarro, medical pioneer Jacob Da Costa, and others can be found in the documents.

The US Virgin Islands Public Library System currently consists of five libraries. Three in St. Croix: Athalie McFarlane Peterson Public Library in Frederiksted, and the Regional Library for the Blind and Physically Handicapped and the Florence Augusta Williams Public Library, both in Christiansted. One in St. John, Elaine Ione Sprauve Public Library and Museum of Cultural Arts in Cruz Bay. While St. Thomas has two: Charles Wesley Turnbull Regional Public Library in Estate Tutu and Enid M. Baa Public Library and Archives in Charlotte Amalie, the Enid M. Baa Library is currently closed to the public and used for administrative purposes. The US Virgin Island Public Library System is administered by the USVI Department of Planning and Natural Resources' Division of Libraries, Archives, and Museums.

The US Virgin Islands Public Library System provides free reader services to adults, children, young adults, and seniors. Collections include: adult fiction and non-fiction; children's fiction and non-fiction; reference materials, magazines, daily newspapers, and DVDs. The library system also houses original and microfilm collections of Virgin Islands Archives, records, newspapers and other materials. The Virgin Islands Automated Library System provides a database and computerized support network for books, reading materials and patron records for the library and archives collections. The viNGN Public Computer Centers provide patrons with free access to high-speed connections to access the Internet and the World Wide Web.

=== Sports ===
Basketball is one of the popular sports in the U.S. Virgin Islands. There is currently one player in the NBA from the U.S. Virgin Islands, 2019 NBA draft pick Nicolas Claxton, who plays for the Chicago Bulls. NBA Hall-of-Famer and five-time champion Tim Duncan of the San Antonio Spurs is also a native of the U.S. Virgin Islands. Consensus 2022 NCAA women's player of the year and USA national team member Aliyah Boston (University of South Carolina) was born and raised in St. Thomas.

In cricket, U.S. Virgin Islanders are eligible to compete internationally as part of the West Indies. The most recent U.S. Virgin Islander to be named to the West Indies squad is Hayden Walsh Jr., who was born in St. Croix. In regional Caribbean competitions, U.S. Virgin Islanders compete in List A and first-class cricket as part of the Leeward Islands cricket team. Currently, the U.S. Virgin Islands are not represented in Caribbean Twenty20 leagues.

There are also a men's and women's national soccer teams.

=== Public holidays ===
- January 1: New Year's Day
- January 6: Three Kings Day
- January (third Monday): Martin Luther King Jr. Day
- February (third Monday): Presidents' Day
- March 31: Transfer Day (celebrates the transfer of the islands from Denmark to the United States)
- March–April: Holy Thursday, Good Friday, Easter Monday
- May (fourth Monday): Memorial Day
- June 19: Juneteenth
- July 3: Emancipation Day
- July 4: U.S. Independence Day
- September (first Monday): Labor Day
- October (second Monday): Virgin Islands–Puerto Rico Friendship Day/Columbus Day
- November 1: D. Hamilton Jackson Day (also known as "Liberty Day", or "Bull and Bread Day")
- November 11: Veterans Day
- November (fourth Thursday): Thanksgiving Day
- December 25: Christmas
- December 26: Christmas Second Day (also known as "Boxing Day")

Virgin Islands government employees are also given administrative leave for St. Croix carnival events in January and St. Thomas carnival events in April/May.

== Notable people ==
- List of people from the United States Virgin Islands

== See also ==
- Outline of the United States Virgin Islands
- Index of United States Virgin Islands-related articles
- Bibliography of the United States Virgin Islands
