= Danish West Indian daler =

Currency of the Danish West Indies (1849–1917)

Dansk Vestindiske daler (Danish)
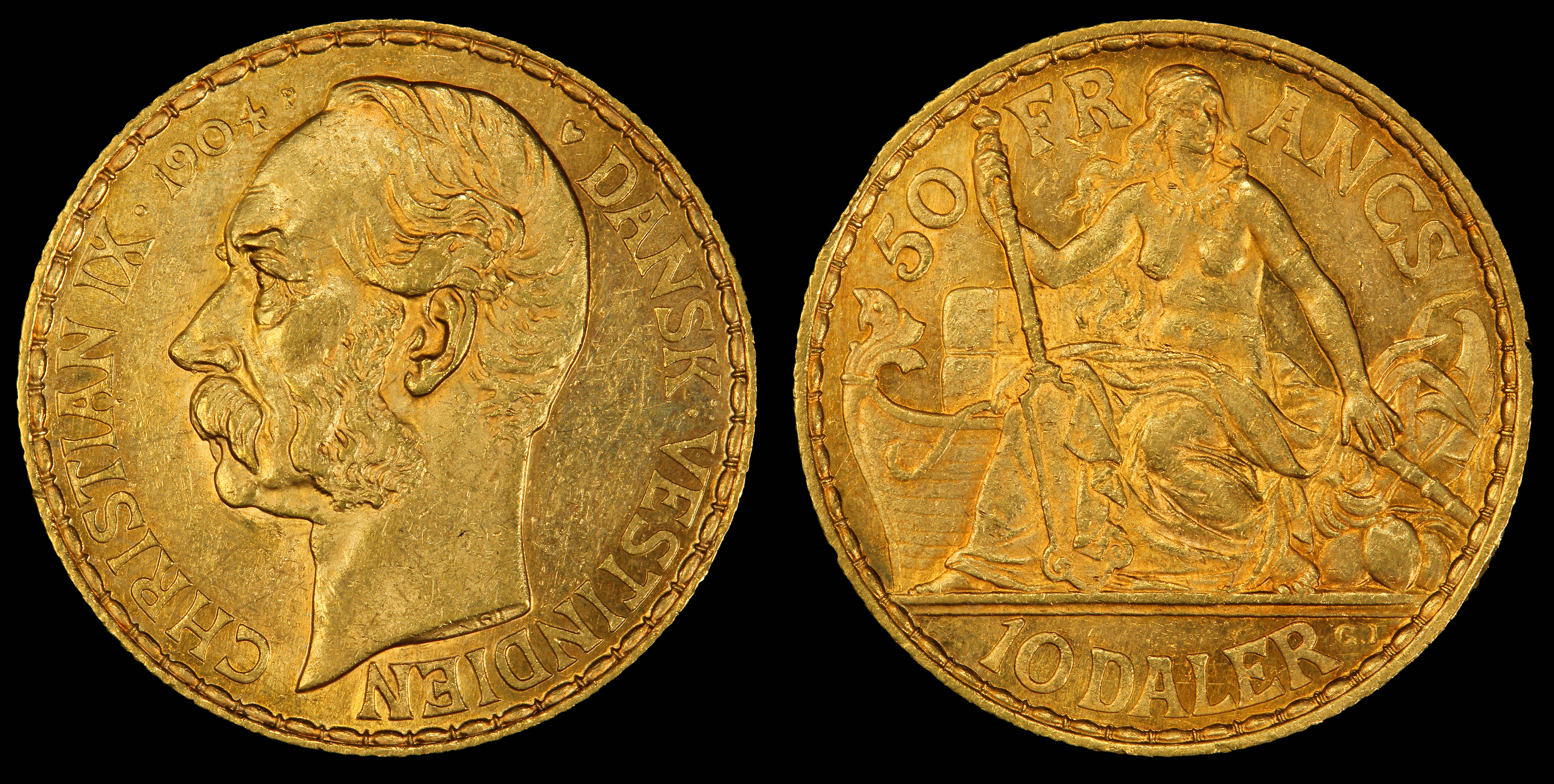
- The 1904 50 Francs (10 Daler) gold coin (on average) contains 16.129 grams of gold (0.9000 fine) and weighs 0.4667 ounces. Only 2,005 were struck.

Units of account
- Subunit
- 1/500: bit
- 1/100: cent
- 1/5: franc

Denominations
- Banknotes
- Freq. used: 5, 10, 20 and 100 francs
- Coins
- Freq. used: 1/2, 1, 2, 5, 10, 20 and 40 cents

Demographics
- Date of introduction: 1849
- User(s): Danish West Indies; United States Virgin Islands
- This infobox shows the latest status before this currency was rendered obsolete.

The daler (Danish, plural the same or dalere, English: dollar) was the currency of the Danish West Indies between 1849 and 1917, and of the United States Virgin Islands between 1917 and 1934.

== History ==
The daler replaced the rigsdaler in 1849. No subdivisions were issued until 1859, although a variety of coins were countermarked for use on the islands. In 1859, coins denominated in cents were introduced, with 100 cents = 1 daler.

In 1904, two new denominations were introduced, the bit and franc. The four units were related as 5 bit = 1 cent, 100 bit = 20 cents = 1 franc, 100 cents = 5 francs = 1 daler. Coins were issued each denominated in two units, bits and cents, francs and cents, or francs and daler. Gold coins were struck and issued in 4 and 10 daler denominations (121,000 and 2,005 minted respectively) only in 1904. Banknotes were issued denominated in francs. The franc was equal to the French franc, with text on the reverse of the banknotes (see ) giving the value in Danish kroner and øre, with 1 franc = 72 øre.

The daler was replaced by the U.S. dollar 17 years after the Danish West Indies became the U.S. Virgin Islands in 1934, with 1 dollar = 1.0363 daler. This was done through identical ordinances passed by the Colonial Councils for the municipality of Saint Thomas & Saint John and the municipality of Saint Croix, with the agreement of the US Treasury after the expiration of the charter of the National Bank of the Danish West Indies. The US dollar became legal tender on 1 July 1934, while the Danish West Indian daler coins remained legal tender until 14 July 1935 (1 year after Governor Paul Martin Pearson had proclaimed that the US government would exchange US currency for the old Danish currency at the legal rate of conversion as required under the ordinances).

== Coins ==
Just before September 28, 1850, U.S. half dollars with the years 1848, 1849 and 1850 and quarter dollars with the year 1849 were stamped with a crowned FRVII for circulation in the Danish West Indies as shown in the Standard World Coin catalog of Krause & Mishler 1801–1900. One of the half dollars and the quarter dollar was sent to the Colonial Central Office in Copenhagen in 1850 - these coins are now kept in the Royal Coin Cabinet in the National Museum of Denmark in Copenhagen. Only these denominations with the above-mentioned years are considered genuine for circulation in Danish West Indies - and they were replaced in 1859 with new coins minted in Denmark for the Danish West Indies.

Until 1878 no other denominations was known with such countermarks - but denominations from U.S., Brazilian, British, British West Indies, French, Dutch and Spanish coins were from then on known to have been stamped with vaguely similar countermarks. These coins were mostly fabricated in France to sell to coin collectors and have not been in circulation in the Danish West Indies. These fabricated denominations listed in another Krause & Mishler catalog as well as in the coin catalog Unusual World Coins (which includes fantasy coins) are 1/2 and 1 cent, 1/4, 1/2 and 1 dollar from the US, 1/8 and 1/4 dollar from the British West Indies' anchor coinage, British farthings, 1/2 and 6 pence, 1 shilling, 1/2 and 1 crown, French 5 sous and 1/2 franc, Mexican 8 reales, Dutch 25 cent and Spanish 4 maravedíes, 1, 2 and 4 reales.

In 1859, coins were introduced in denominations of 1, 3, 5, 10 and 20 cents. Except for the bronze 1 cent, these coins were silver. In 1904, with the new currency system, gold coins were introduced in denominations of 4 daler (20 francs) and 10 daler (50 francs). These were followed in 1905 by denominations of 1/2, 1, 2, 5, 10, 20 and 40 cents. These coins also bore the denominations 2 1/2, 5, 10, 25 and 50 bit, 1 and 2 francs. The 1/2, 1 and 2 cents were struck in bronze, the 5 cents in nickel and the other denominations in silver.

== Banknotes ==
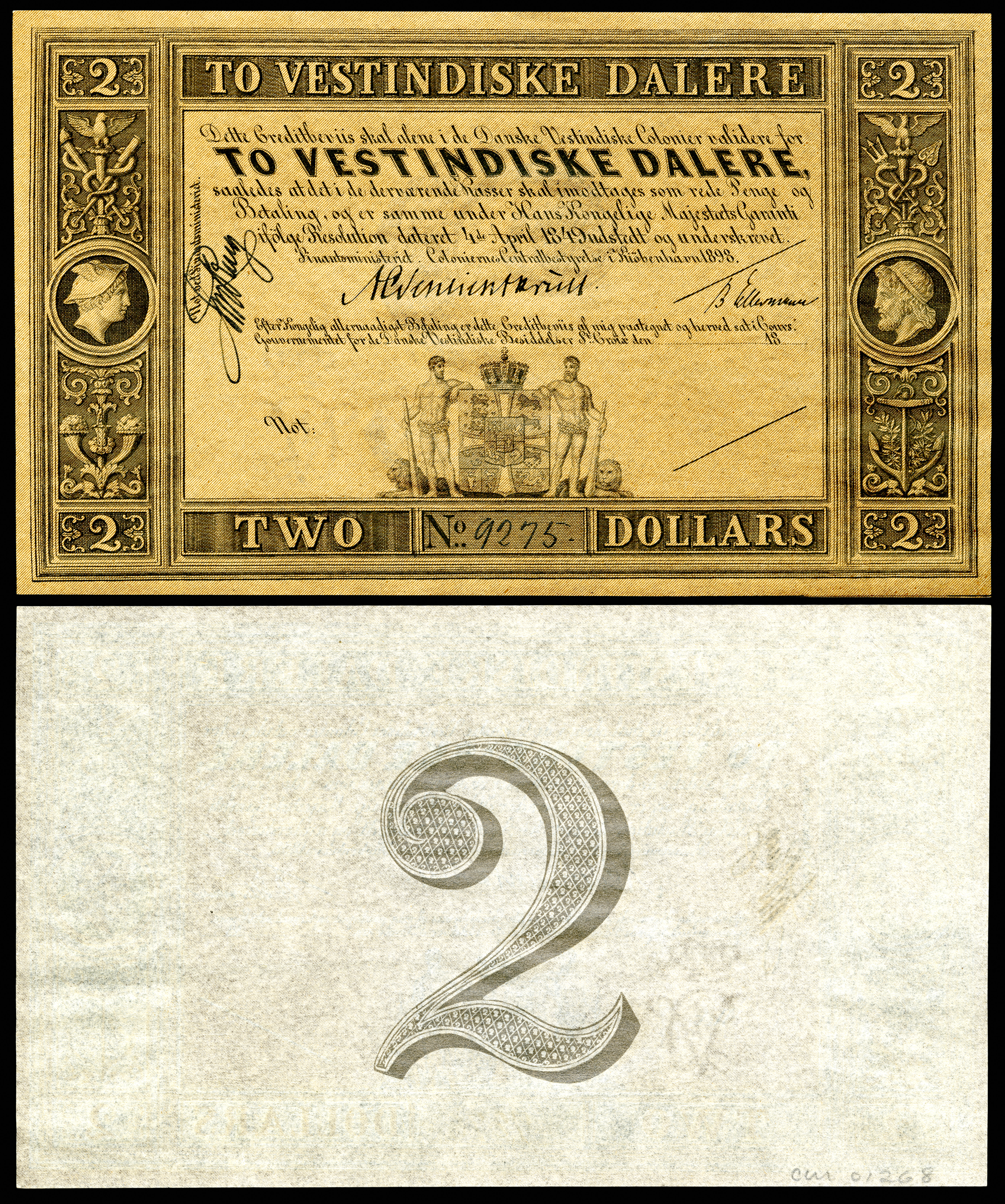
Danish West Indies, Saint Croix, 2 dalere (1898)

In 1849, the State Treasury introduced notes in denominations of 2, 3, 5, 10, 50 and 100 dalere. The Bank of St Thomas issued notes denominated in dollars between 1837 and 1889. It is not indicated on the notes which dollar this was.

In 1905, the Dansk-Vestindiske Nationalbank (Danish West Indies National Bank) introduced notes in denominations of 5, 10, 20 and 100 francs, which also bore indications of their value in Danish kroner, 3.6, 7.2, 14.4 and 72 kroner.
