= St. Croix USVI Country Day School =

Coordinates: 17°45′9.32″N 64°45′58″W

St. Croix Country Day School
- Kingshill, Virgin Islands; USA

Information
- Type: Independent, College preparatory
- Established: 1964
- Headmaster: William D. Sinfield
- Faculty: 50
- Grades: PreK-12
- Enrollment: 490
- Colors: Orange & White
- Athletics: 8 varsity sports
- Athletics conference: SCIAA (St. Croix Interscholastic Athletic Association)
- Mascot: Tigers, Lady Tigers
- Tuition: $7,350-$11,000
- Website: stxcountryday.com

St. Croix Country Day School was an independent, non-sectarian, non-profit college preparatory school serving all grades from PreK-12 located in Kingshill, St. Croix, US Virgin Islands. The student body was made up of 490 students.

Students in the grades 9 through 12 were offered a wide variety of courses on a 5 day alternating schedule, including AP courses as available. Languages taught included both French and Spanish. There was a robust theatre program, with a comedy or drama performed in the fall and a musical in the spring. In addition to the theatre program, Country Day's music program includes both a middle school and high school choir, middle and high school band, a bell ensemble, and a steel drum band. These groups performed in twice-yearly concerts; a Christmas concert and an end of year spring concert.

In 2013, following the closure of the Hovensa oil refinery on island and the subsequent loss of many members of the student body, St. Croix Country Day School merged with the Good Hope School to form the Good Hope Country Day School. The merged school, however, still holds its classes on the Country Day campus.

== Athletics and competition ==
St. Croix Country Day School was a member of the St. Croix Interscholastic Athletic Association, and competed in various sports throughout the year.

Fall

- Varsity Football (All Private Schools)
- Varsity Volleyball (Boys & Girls)
- Junior Varsity Volleyball (Boys & Girls)
- Middle School Volleyball (Girls)
- Sailing Team (Co-Ed)
- Elementary Baseball (Boys)

Winter

- Varsity Basketball (Boys and Girls)
- Junior Varsity Basketball (Boys and Girls)
- Middle School Basketball (Boys and Girls)
- Elementary Basketball (Boys and Girls)

Spring

- Varsity Soccer (Co-Ed)
- Junior Varsity Soccer (Co-Ed)
- Elementary Soccer (Co-Ed)
- Varsity Baseball (Boys)
- Varsity Softball (Girls)
- Varsity Tennis
- Varsity Golf

SCCDS has had success in varsity soccer, winning five of six St. Croix championships from 2003 to 2008. The varsity volleyball teams are perennially among the leaders on island as well.

Other competitions include Quiz Bowl and Science Bowl. Country Day has won the last six Virgin Islands territorial Quiz Bowl championships from 2003 to 2011, and has competed in the New Orleans national competition in each of those years, including a national playoff appearance in 2008.
