= Cruzan =

Cruzan can mean:

- The alternate spelling of Crucian:
  - a native of St. Croix, U.S. Virgin Islands
  - the native dialect spoken on that island, also known as Virgin Islands Creole
- Cruzan Rum, a rum produced on St. Croix, U.S. Virgin Islands
- Nancy Cruzan, a key figure in the right-to-die movement
- Cruzan Amphitheatre, a 19,000-seat open-air music venue in West Palm Beach, Florida
