= Cory Bishop =

U.S. Virgin Islands soccer player

Personal information
- Full name: Cory Bishop
- Place of birth: Saint Croix, U.S. Virgin Islands
- Height: 6 ft 3 in (1.91 m)
- Positions: Defender; defensive midfielder

Senior career*
Years	Team	Apps	(Gls)
2008–2010	Bucknell Bison		

International career^{‡}
2008–	U.S. Virgin Islands	1	(0)
- * Club domestic league appearances and goals ‡ National team caps and goals as of 06:09, 12 February 2009 (UTC)

Cory Bishop is a U.S. Virgin Islands soccer player who played as a defender or midfielder. He has gained one international cap for the United States Virgin Islands national soccer team.

== Early career ==
He attended Good Hope High School, where he was captain of his high-school soccer team, winning two consecutive St. Croix championships.

Bishop represented U.S. Virgin Islands soccer team at under-16 and under-18 level, as well representing the U.S. Virgin Islands volleyball team at under-18 and under-20 levels.

== International career ==
Bishop made his international debut for the U.S. Virgin Islands starting against Grenada Islands in the 10–0 World Cup 2010 qualifier defeat on 26 March 2008.
