= Virgin Islands patch reefs =

The Virgin Islands Patch Reefs are numerous, small subtropical coral reef ecoregions. These reefs are located on all three islands: St. John, St. Thomas, and St. Croix. Of the three islands, St. Croix has an established barrier reef. It is approximately 20 meters deep and covers 485 sq km ( 187.26 sq mi).

== Distribution ==
Patch reefs are miniature reefs, they are usually isolated and grow around the base of an island or along a continental shelf. Their size varies and it is rare for them to reach the water surface. Patch reefs are separated from other reefs by sand, seagrass, and habitats without structure. This habitat is recognisable by the halo of sand if it is next to submerged vegetation. Many are found far from the shore but some can still be accessed by snorkelers. They are located around St. Thomas, St. Croix, and St. John as well as several smaller islands located near the main three. St. Thomas and St. John coral reefs are found patchily around them. They are considered fringing and patch developments. On St. Croix there is a barrier reef surrounding its eastern and southern shore which hosts its patch reefs, other patch reefs are located offshore at substantial depths.

== Ecology ==
Corals can survive in areas that are temperate or tropical. Shallow-water reefs are only found in areas 30° N to 30° S from the equator. While past depths of 50 meters tropical corals will not grow. The best temperature for coral reefs is 26–27 °C, although they can adapt to grow at temperatures of 13 °C or 18 °C. They need to live in areas where enough sunlight can come through the water so photosynthesis can take place. They get about 90% of nutrients from symbiont relationships such as the mutualism one they share with zooxanthellae. How large and strong a coral is, is dependent on the area it grew in. aside from their symbiont relationships they can also receive nutrients from the water itself. Coral reefs are usually found in specific zones. These zones depict different habitats. The known zones are the fore reef, reef crest, and backreef. All zones are connected and have important roles in the growth and development of the reefs. Coral reefs that are found surrounding islands were created when islands recede into the ocean.

== Benefits ==
The benefits of these reefs include tourism, fisheries, and coastline protection. They give protection to the shorelines by absorbing wave energy and each year approximately six million tons of fish are taken out of the reefs. They also add biodiversity to oceans. They shelter various marine life and provide recreational activities for locals and tourists. They even provide potential medicines. They house species such as the barracudas, jacks, mackerel, night fishes, urchins, and various invertebrates.

== Threats ==
However, many of them are now in danger. They are undergoing coral bleaching and other diseases. Coral bleaching occurs when the water becomes too warm. The increased water temperature triggers the coral to release its zooxanthellae. The loss of its symbiotic algae results in the discoloration of the coral tissue. They can loss zooxanthellae for a little while, however if more than a couple weeks pass then death occurs. They also have been found to have black band disease, white band disease, white plague disease. These diseases result of death of patches with few survivors if any.

These diseases aren't the only things affecting corals. Their population is declining because of coral mining, agricultural runoff, pollution, overfishing, and canal digging. They are also affected by temperature increase, pH change, excess sediments, rising of the sea level, and human activity. Many are trying to find ways to stop the decline of coral reefs or at the very least to find a way to slow down the decline. One recovery method includes coral aquaculture or coral farming/gardening. In this method, they grow the corals in a nursery and when they are old enough they replant them. They are also trying to provide substrates allowing corals to find a home. Substrates could be anything from car tires to oil rigs.
