= Mount Eagle (U.S. Virgin Islands) =

Mountain in Saint Croix, U.S. Virgin Islands

- Location within Saint Croix, U.S. Virgin Islands Location within the U.S. Virgin Islands

Highest point
- Elevation: 1,160 ft (350 m)
- Prominence: 1,160 ft (350 m)
- Coordinates: 17°45′39″N 64°48′42″W

Geography
- Location: Saint Croix, United States Virgin Islands

Climbing
- Easiest route: Hike

Mount Eagle is the highest point on the island of Saint Croix at an elevation of 1,160 feet (350 m).

A hiking trail leading from West Scenic Road leads to the summit from 17°75'8264°N, -64°80'4354

== See also ==
- Geography of the United States Virgin Islands
