= Good Hope Country Day School =

Location
- Kingshill, Virgin Islands; USA
- Coordinates: 17.7525941°N 64.768449°W

Information
- Type: Independent, College preparatory
- Established: 1738
- Headmaster: Bill Sinfield
- Faculty: 50
- Grades: PreK-12
- Enrollment: 500
- Colors: Black & Gold
- Athletics: 8 varsity sports
- Athletics conference: SCIAA
- Mascot: Panthers
- Tuition: $8,500-$14,500
- Website: ghcds.org

Good Hope Country Day School, formerly St. Croix Country Day School prior to a merger in 2013 with the Good Hope School, is an independent, non-sectarian, non-profit, college preparatory school serving all grades from PreK-12 located in Kingshill, St. Croix, US Virgin Islands. The student body is made up of 490 students.

== Athletics & Competition ==
Good Hope Country Day School is a member of the St. Croix Interscholastic Athletic Association, and competes in a vast array of sports throughout the year.

Fall

- Volleyball
- Flag Football
- Cross Country
- Baseball
- Beach Volleyball
- Tennis
- Golf
- Sailing
- Swimming

Winter

- Basketball
- Track and Field
- Sailing
- Swimming

Spring

- Softball
- Soccer
- Sailing
- Swimming

GHCDS won the 2015 SCIAA varsity soccer championships.

Prior to the merger, St. Croix Country Day School and The Good Hope School were varsity soccer rivals. In 2010, SCCDS beat GHS for the sixth time in seven season.

The varsity volleyball teams are perennially among the leaders on island as well.

Other competitions include Quiz Bowl and Science Bowl. Country Day has won the last six Virgin Islands territorial Quiz Bowl championships dating back to 2003, and has competed in the national competition in each of those years, including a national playoff appearance in 2008.
