= Cruzan Rum =

Rum producer in Saint Croix, U.S. Virgin Islands

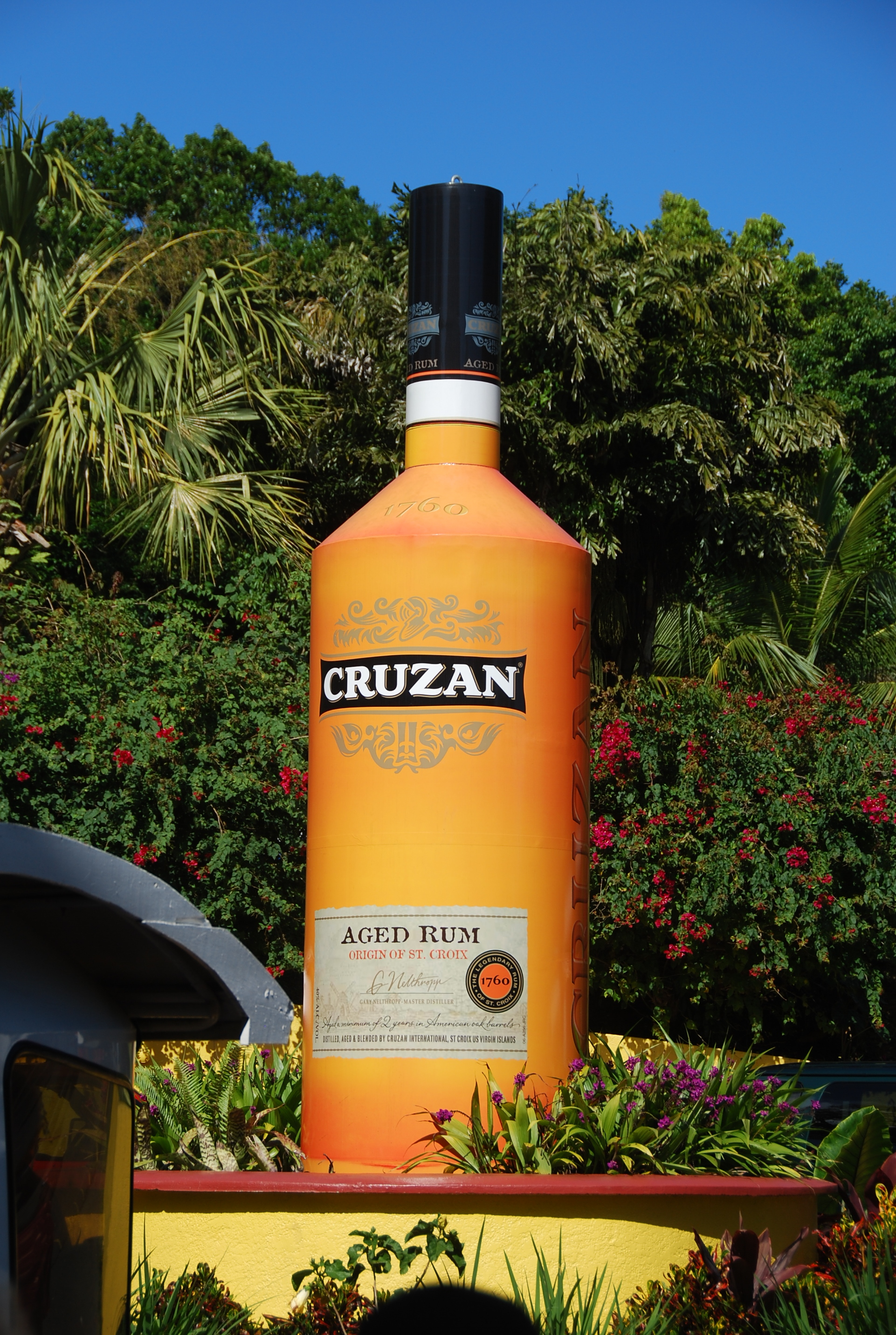
- Cruzan Rum bottle at Mountain Hill, St. Thomas, USVI

- Location within Saint Croix, U.S. Virgin Islands Location within the U.S. Virgin Islands
- Location: 3A, Frederiksted St Croix 00840, USVI
- Coordinates: 17.7047479°N 64.8281485°W

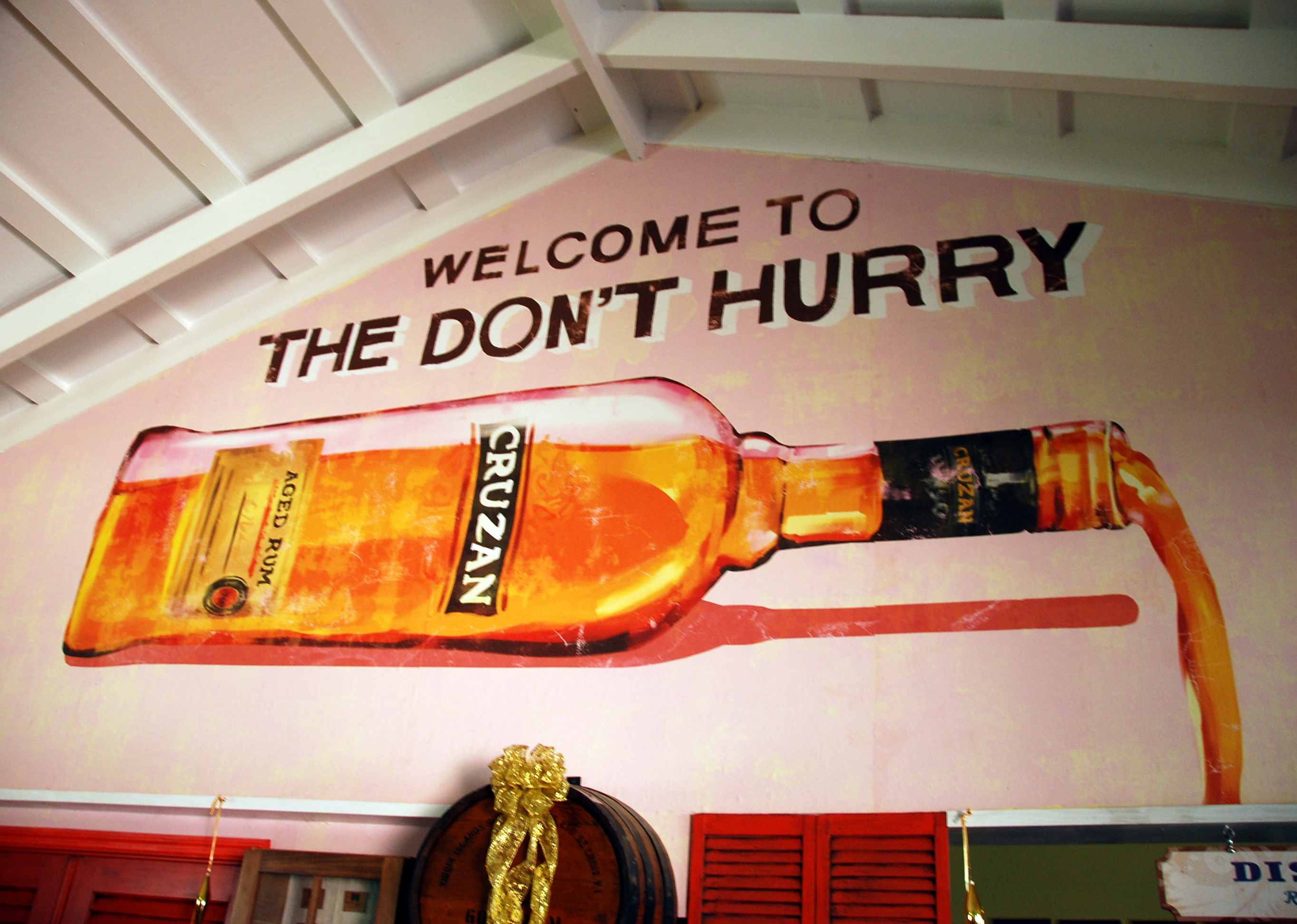
Cruzan Rum Distillery

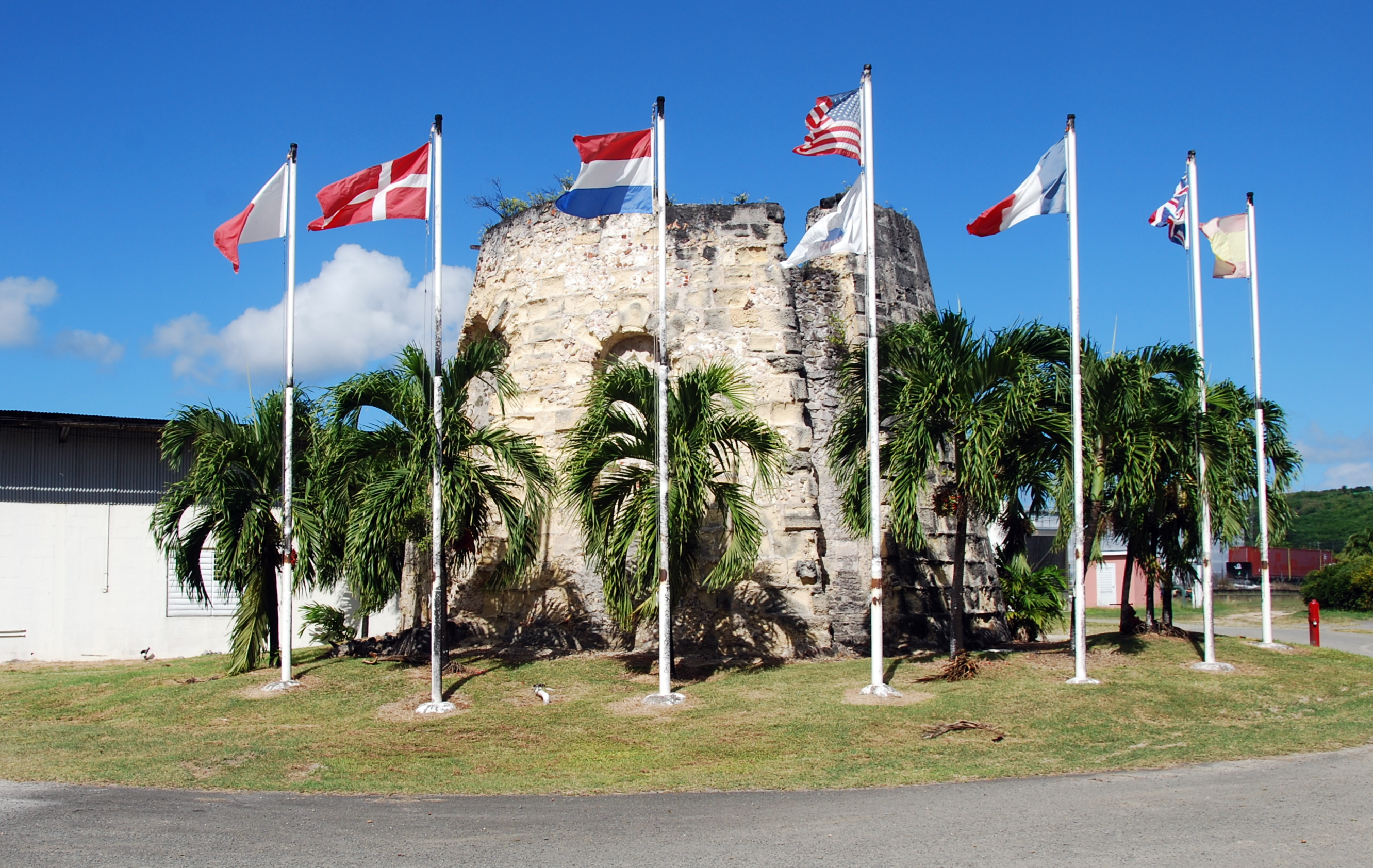
Cruzan Rum Distillery

Cruzan Rum (/ˈkruːʒən/ KROO-zhən) is a rum producer in Saint Croix, U.S. Virgin Islands and owned by Suntory Global Spirits, a subsidiary of Suntory Holdings of Osaka, Japan. Founded in 1760, it claims the distinction of being "the most honored rum distillery in the world." For eight generations, and through various changes in corporate ownership, it has been managed by the Nelthropp family.

== Background ==
The distillery is also the largest supplier of American private and distributor label rum. Cruzan Rum also makes a pure cane distillate alcohol (in 189-proof), which can be found for sale in the medicine sections of many grocery stores in the U.S. Virgin Islands. Cruzan is one of two rum distilleries which, due to their place in American history, are part of the American Whiskey Trail.

Cruzan rum is made similar to a traditional Cuban style that produces an exceptionally clean, and lighter bodied rum. Although Cruzan rums generally have had mixed success at international spirit ratings competitions, the single-barrel has performed extremely well. Cruzan's most notable showing was from 2009 raters at the Beverage Testing Institute who gave it a 96 (out of 100). Proof66 rates the single-barrel amongst the Top 20 rums in the world.

== Distillery ==
The Cruzan Rum Distillery (formerly known as Estate Diamond) has been in operation for more than 250 years. Tours of the distillery and its historic grounds including original sugar mill run 6 days a week in Frederiksted.

== Rums ==
- Cruzan 151°: aged for a minimum of one year in American oak barrels. The winner of silver medal at the 2011 San Francisco World Spirits Competition and gold medal at the 2002 Beverage Testing Institute.
- Cruzan 9: spiced rum named for the 9 different herbs used to make it and also the 9 districts of St. Croix.
- Cruzan Rum Cream: a blend of Cruzan light rum, pure Irish cream, caramel, vanilla and other flavors. (discontinued)
- Cruzan Velvet Cinn: a traditional horchata blend of Cruzan light rum, rich dairy cream, and cinnamon.

=== Estate ===
- Cruzan Estate Light: aged two years.
- Cruzan Estate Dark: aged two years, available in both 80- and 151-proof.
- Cruzan Estate Diamond: aged five years. Back in production - now available as both a dark and a light.

=== Single barrel ===
Cruzan Single Barrel: a blend of rums aged 5-12 years then rebarreled in new oak barrels for additional aging. The winner of double gold medals and the title "World's Best Rum" at the 2000, and 2010 San Francisco World Spirits Competition, as well as numerous other gold medals at various spirits competitions.

=== Black strap ===
Cruzan Black Strap: a heavier bodied version of Cruzan light rum with the addition of blackstrap molasses from tropical sugar cane. According to Gary Nelthropp, Master Distiller for Cruzan, there is no blackstrap molasses in the flavoring component. It is named after blackstrap molasses solely for marketing purposes.

=== Light rum ===
Cruzan Light Aged Rum is aged in oak for at least one year and then carbon filtered for clarity.

=== Flavored rum ===
Branded as Cruzan Tropical Rums, white rum blended with flavorings. Available in raspberry, coconut, mango, vanilla, pineapple, banana, black cherry, citrus, guava, key lime, passion fruit, orange, peach, blueberry/lemonade and strawberry.

A watermelon variety was introduced in 2019.
