= Saint Croix =

One of the main islands of the United States Virgin Islands

Nickname: Twin City
- Location within the U.S. Virgin Islands Location within Lesser Antilles Location within the Caribbean

Geography
- Location: Caribbean
- Coordinates: 17.733509°N 64.783864°W
- Archipelago: Virgin Islands, Leeward Islands
- Area: 84 (Note: This is the figure reported by the government of the U.S. Virgin Islands on the St. Croix page of usvi.net. Other reliable sources report different figures. The article at the on-line edition of the Encyclopedia Britannica reports the area as 84 square miles. The Virgin Islands (United States) page at the United Nations Environment Programme's Island Directory gives the area as 214.4 square kilometers, equivalent to 82.8 square miles. Although the U.S. Census Bureau does not report the areas of geographic entities, it does report their population densities (equal to the total population divided by the area). In the 2010 census, the population was reported as 50,601 (Table P1, "Total Population") and the population density was reported as 607.3 per square mile (Table P40, "Population Density"). Together, these figures imply an area of 83.3 square miles.) sq mi (220 km^{2})
- Length: 22 mi (35 km)
- Width: 7 mi (11 km)
- Highest elevation: 1,165 ft (355.1 m)
- Highest point: Mount Eagle

Administration
- United States Virgin Islands
- Territory: Virgin Islands
- District: District of Saint Croix

Demographics
- Demonym: Crucian; Cruzan
- Population: 41,004 (2020 census)
- Pop. density: 488/sq mi (188.4/km^{2})
- Ethnic groups: Afro-Caribbean, Puerto Rican, White, Indian, Arab, Asian, Native American, Multiracial

Saint Croix (/krɔɪ/ KROY; Spanish: Santa Cruz; Dutch: Sint-Kruis; French: Sainte-Croix; Danish and Norwegian: Sankt Croix; Taino: Ay Ay) is an island in the Caribbean, and a county and constituent district of the United States Virgin Islands (USVI), an unincorporated territory of the United States.

St. Croix is the largest of the territory's islands. As of the 2020 U.S. census, its population was 41,004. The island's highest point is Mount Eagle, at 355 meters (1,165 ft). St. Croix's nickname is "Twin City", for its two towns, Frederiksted on the western end and Christiansted on the northeast part of the island.

== Name ==
The island's indigenous Taíno name is Ay Ay ('the river'). Its indigenous Carib name is Cibuquiera ('the stony land'). Its modern name, Saint Croix, is derived from the French Sainte-Croix, itself a translation of the Spanish name Isla de la Santa Cruz (meaning 'island of the Holy Cross') given by Christopher Columbus in 1493. The French name was partially retained under Danish rule as Sankt Croix, and the island was given its current spelling after the U.S. takeover in 1917. The associated demonym for the island is Crucian, derived from the original Spanish name.

== History ==
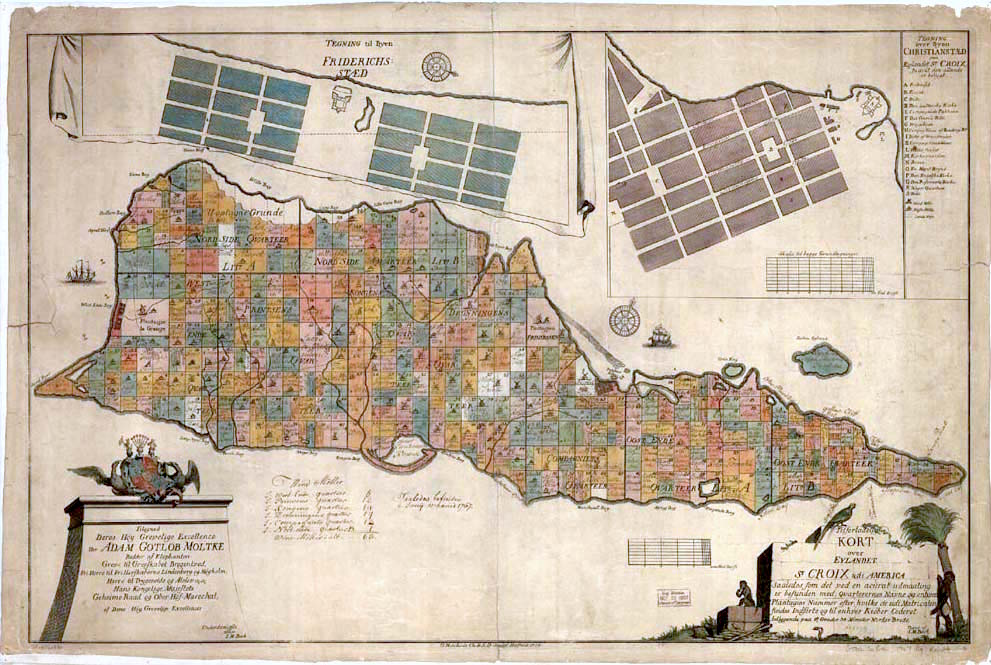
A 1754 Danish map of the island

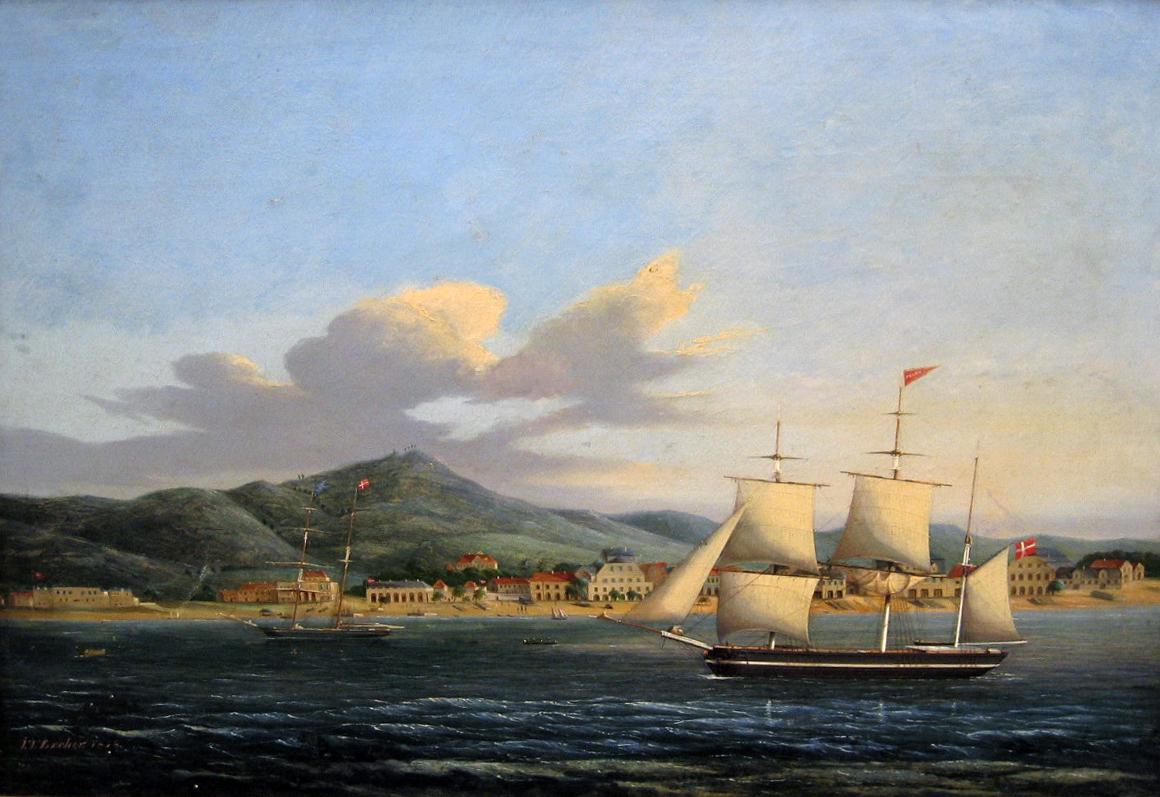
Frederiksstad on Sankt Croix, 1848

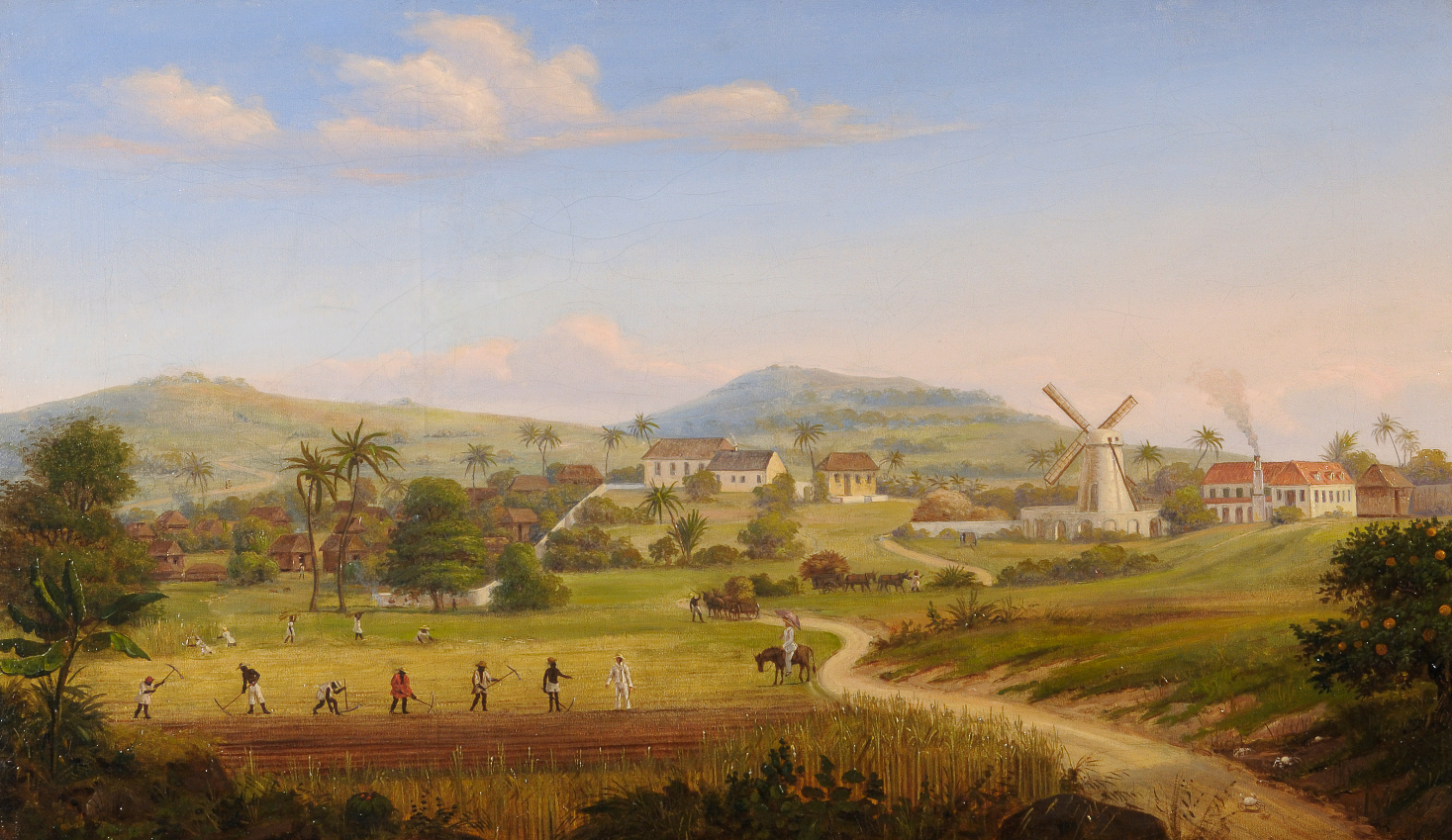
Enslaved African workers on Mary's Fancy plantation, owned by George Ryan

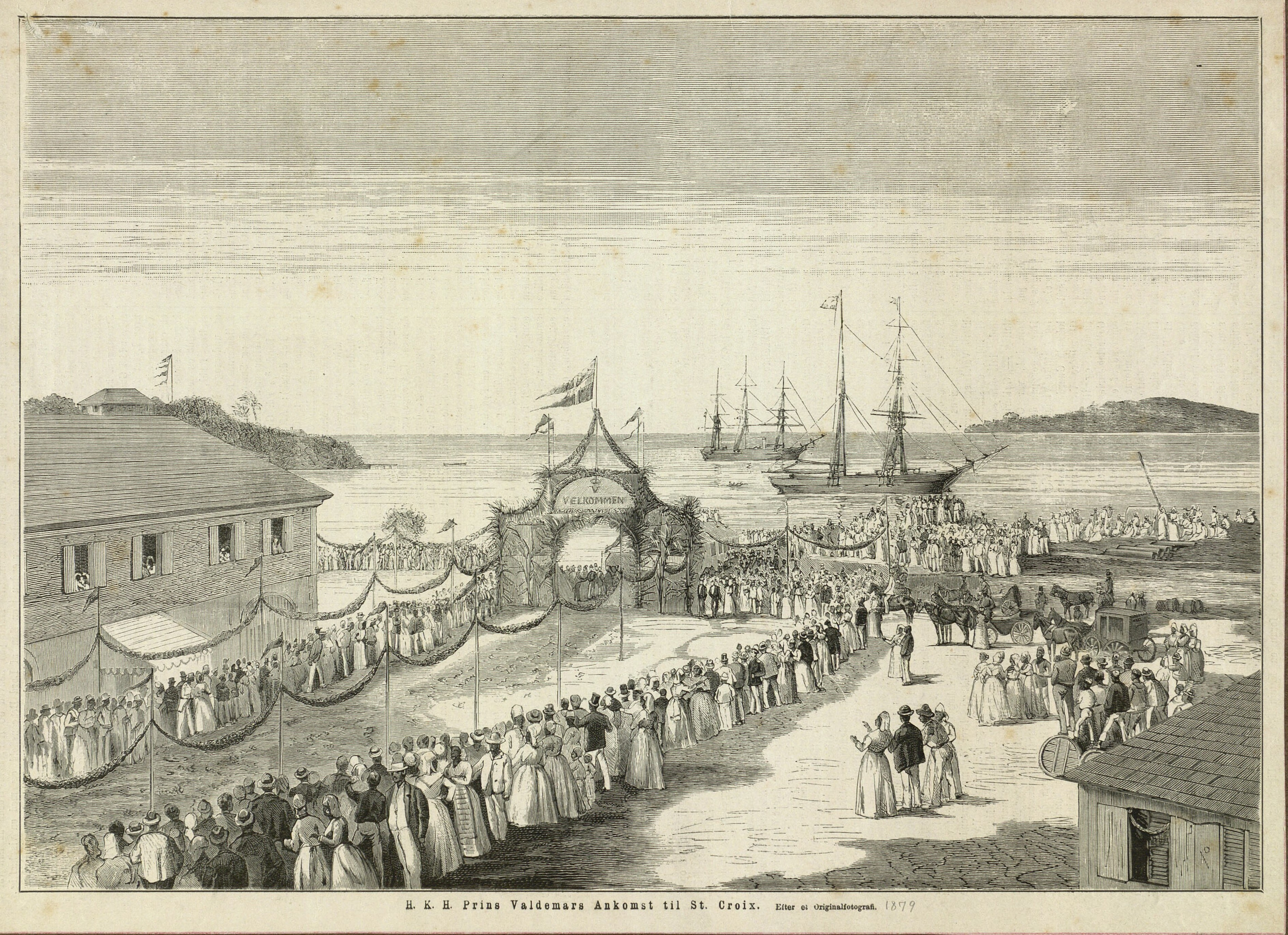
Prince Valdemar's arrival at St. Croix, 1879

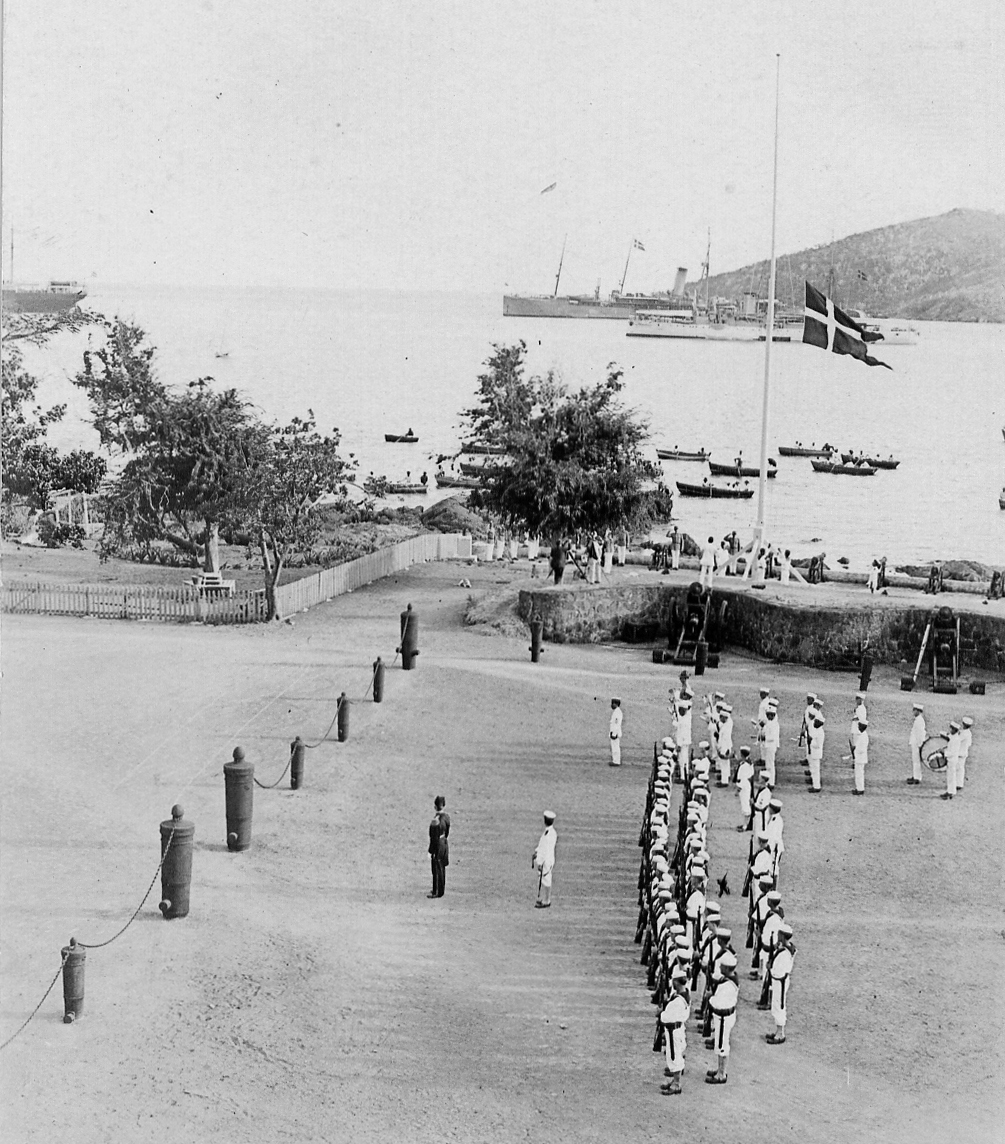
Dannebrog being lowered at the Governor's Mansion for the last time (31 March 1917)

Igneri pottery indicates human presence on the island from 1–700 CE, followed by the Taíno from 700 to 1425, before the encroachment by the Caribs in 1425; the island was uninhabited by 1590.

Various indigenous groups inhabited the island during its prehistory. Columbus landed on Santa Cruz, as he called it, on 14 November 1493, and was immediately attacked by the Kalinago, who lived at Salt River on the north shore. This is the first recorded fight between the Spanish and a New World native population, and Columbus gave the battle site the name Cabo de la Flecha (Cape of the Arrow). The Spanish never colonized the Islands, but most or all of the native population was eventually dispersed or killed. By the end of the 16th century, the islands were said to be uninhabited.

=== Colonial period ===
Dutch and English settlers landed at Saint Croix in 1625, joined by some French refugees from Saint Kitts. The English expelled the Dutch and French settlers before they themselves were evicted by a Spanish invasion from Puerto Rico in August 1650. Around 1650, a French force attacked and established a colony of 300. From 1651 until 1664, the Knights of Malta (at the time a vassal state of the Kingdom of Sicily) ruled the island in the name of Louis XIV. The island then passed to the French West India Company. The colony was evacuated to Saint-Domingue in 1695, when France battled the English and Dutch in the War of the Grand Alliance. The island was then uninhabited and abandoned for another 38 years.

In 1725, St. Thomas Governor Frederik Moth encouraged the Danish West Indies Company's directors to consider purchasing Santa Cruz (St. Croix). On 15 June 1733, France and Denmark-Norway concluded a treaty by which the Danish West India Company bought St. Croix for 750,000 livres. Louis XV ratified the treaty on 28 June 1733 and received half the payment in French coins, with the remaining half paid in 18 months. On 16 November 1733, Moth was named St. Croix's first Danish governor. The 1742 census lists 120 sugar plantations, 122 cotton plantations, 1,906 slaves, and 360 whites. By 1754, slaves numbered 7,566. That year, King Frederick took direct control of St. Croix from the company.

For nearly 200 years, St. Croix, St. Thomas, and St. John were the Danish West Indies. By the mid- to late 18th century, the peak of the plantation economy, St. Croix's enslaved population numbered between 18,000 and 20,000. The white population during this time ranged between 1,500 and 2,000.

Future American revolutionary leader Alexander Hamilton and his brother lived in Christiansted with their mother, Rachel Faucette, on St. Croix after she returned to the island in 1765. Their residence was in the upper floor of a house at 34 Company Street, while Rachel used the lower floor as a shop selling food items. Within two years, Hamilton lost his father, James Hamilton, by abandonment, and his mother to death. Official documents from the island, a 1768 probate court testimony from his uncle, established Alexander's age at 13. By 1769, Hamilton's cousin, aunt, uncle, and grandmother had also died. Alexander's brother James became an apprentice carpenter and Alexander became the ward of Thomas Stevens, a merchant on King Street. Hamilton was soon clerking in the export-import business of Beekman and Cruger at the intersection of King and King's Cross Streets. In 1772, local businessmen funded Hamilton's further education in New York.

The slave trade was abolished in the Danish colonies in 1792, although the prohibition did not go into effect until 1802. Existing enslaved people were freed in 1848, after the 1848 St. Croix Slave Revolt, led by General "Buddhoe" Gottlieb.

The British occupied the Danish West Indies in March 1801, with the arrival of a British fleet at St. Thomas. Denmark-Norway accepted the Articles of Capitulation and the British occupied the islands without a shot being fired. The occupation lasted until April 1802, when Britain returned the islands to Denmark-Norway.

The British invaded the Danish West Indies again in December 1807. A British fleet captured St. Thomas on 22 December and St. Croix on 25 December. Denmark-Norway did not resist and the invasion again was bloodless. This occupation lasted until 20 November 1815. Both invasions were due to Denmark's alliance with France during the Napoleonic Wars. Upon the conclusion of a peace with France, the islands were returned to Denmark.

=== As a United States territory ===
The 1878 St. Croix labor riot shook the island. In 1916, Denmark sold St. Croix, St. Thomas, and St. John to the U.S., formalizing the transfer in the Treaty of the Danish West Indies, in exchange for $25 million in gold. In a national referendum on the issue, 64.2% of Danish voters approved the sale. In an unofficial referendum held in the islands, 99.83% voted in favor of the purchase. Formal transfer of the islands to the U.S. took place on 1 April 1917.

St. Croix's inhabitants were granted U.S. citizenship in 1927. The island industrialized and moved away from an agrarian society in the 1960s. The 1972 Fountain Valley massacre, a mass shooting during a robbery at a golf club, led to a devastating reduction in tourism that lasted many years. In 1989, Hurricane Hugo struck the island with Category 4 winds. The United States Army, the Federal Bureau of Investigation, and the United States Marshals Service were brought in to restore order.

The 2012 shutdown of the Hovensa refinery resulted in the loss of many jobs. Agriculture has seen a slow resurgence, due to an increase in demand for local produce and agricultural products. Category 5 Hurricane Maria's weaker outer eyewall crossed St. Croix in 2017; sustained winds reached over 150 mph and gusted up to 250 mph in some places on the island's western end. Maria damaged or destroyed 70% of St. Croix's buildings, including schools and the only hospital.

== Geography ==
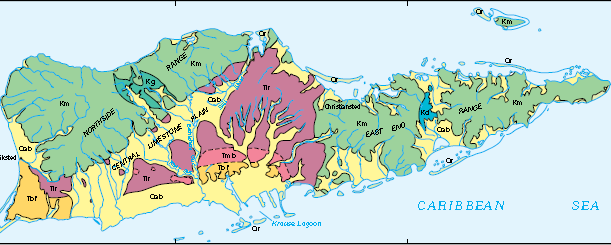
Saint Croix geological map, where Km is the Cretaceous Mt. Eagle Group, Kd is Cretaceous diorite, Kg is Cretaceous gabbro, Tbf is the Pliocene Blessing Formation, Tmb and Tlr are the Miocene King shall Limestone, Qab is Quaternary alluvium, and Qr is Quaternary reef.

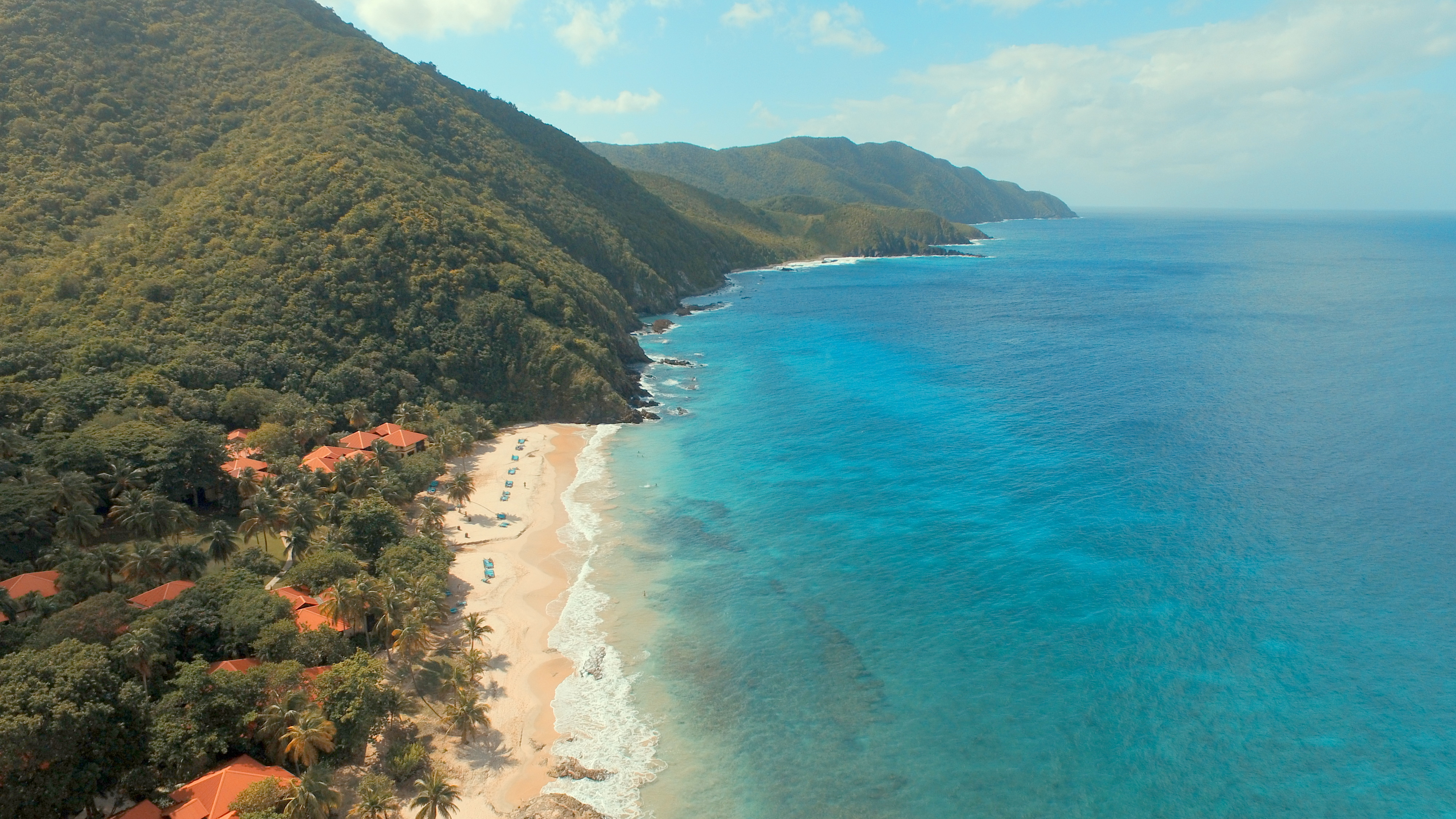
Saint Croix coast

Saint Croix lies at 17°45′N 64°45′W. On the eastern tip of the island, Point Udall is the easternmost point (by travel, not longitude) of the United States including insular areas. The island's highest point, Mount Eagle, is 1,165 feet (355 m) high. Most of the east end is quite hilly and steep, as is the north side from Christiansted west. From the north-side hills, a fairly even plain slopes down to the south coast; this was cultivated as the island's prime sugar land.

The island has a land area of 214.66 km^{2} (82.88 sq mi), making it the largest island of the U.S. Virgin Islands. It has rugged terrain with diverse ecosystems, including subtropical rainforests, coastal plains, shrublands, rocky hills, valleys, and beaches, and as well as coral reefs off the coast.

In 2023, St. Croix was designated a National Heritage Area—the first National Heritage Area to be located in a U.S. Territory.

== Climate ==
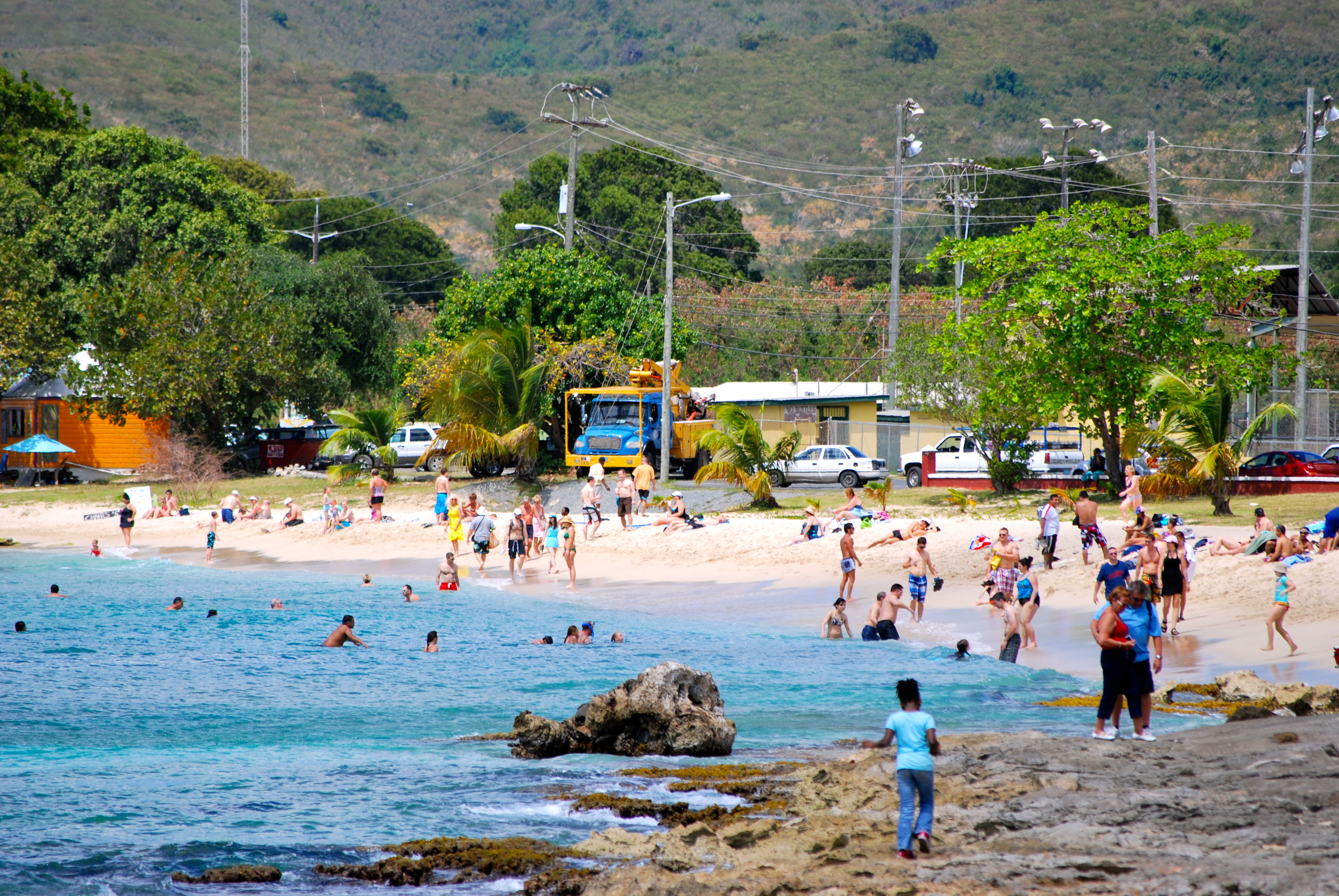
Beach on Saint Croix

St. Croix has a tropic to semi-arid climate. Trade winds blow along the length of the island year round. The temperature ranges from the mid-70s to high 80s Fahrenheit (mid-20s to low 30s Celsius), with an average temperature of 80.2 °F (26.8 °C). Average annual rainfall is around 40 inches (1,000 mm) per year, but rainfall varies by season and location on the island.

The hills of the western part of the island receive a good deal more rain than the east end, with annual rainfall ranging from 50 inches per year in the northwest to 25-38 inches per year in the east. The west end has lush vegetation and palm trees, while the east end of the island is a dry desert range with a substantial amount of cactus.

August to November is the wet season in the U.S. Virgin Islands, with the remainder of the year as the dry season. About 40% of the annual rainfall usually occurs from September to November. During the dry season, fairly severe and extended drought can be a problem for the island, particularly considering the scarcity of freshwater in the U.S. Virgin Islands. St. Croix has a desalination plant, but most residential homes and businesses have built-in cisterns used to collect rainwater.

== Demographics ==
Inhabitants are called Crucians /ˈkruːʒən/ (frequently written as "Cruzans").

Due to St. Croix's history of immigration, there is much debate as to what constitutes a native Crucian. The consensus in Crucian society is anyone bahn ya ("born here" in Crucian dialect) on St. Croix can claim to be Crucian, but not necessarily a native Crucian. People considered native Crucians, or ancestral native Crucians, are those who can trace their ancestry to the era before Crucians were granted U.S. citizenship in 1927. Ancestral native Crucians (one-fourth to one-third of St. Croix's population) largely consist of the descendants of enslaved Africans brought to the island by Europeans during the 18th and 19th centuries and the descendants of paid laborers the Danes recruited from the British and Dutch West Indies after the Danish emancipation law in 1848. As on other Caribbean islands, many ancestral natives are also descended from European settlers and planters who migrated to the West Indies during the 17th, 18th and 19th centuries. Due to a low number of European women in the colonial West Indies, many European men in colonial St. Croix had children with the majority African population, whose mixed-heritage descendants bear their European ancestors' surnames. There are also a handful of ancestral families on the island (traditionally known as bukra) of full European ancestry.

Due to historical economic and political differences, as well as the remnants of a 19th-century caste system based on skin complexion, socioeconomic class differences among ancestral native Crucians can vary widely, even within the same family. Most ancestral native Crucians today are employed by the Government of the Virgin Islands, while others are involved in the tourism industry and the legal and medical professions.

Puerto Rican migration was prevalent in the 1930s, '40s and '50s, when many Puerto Ricans relocated to St. Croix for work after the collapse of the sugar industry. The total population declined by 50% in the century preceding 1945.

The United States Navy purchase of two-thirds of the nearby Puerto Rican island of Vieques during World War II resulted in the displacement of thousands of Viequenses, many of whom relocated to St. Croix because of its similar size and geography. The local holiday of Puerto Rico/U.S. Virgin Islands Friendship Day has been celebrated since the 1960s on the second Monday of October, the same date as Columbus Day. St. Croix's Puerto Ricans, most of whom have lived on the island for more than a generation, have kept their culture alive while integrating it into native Crucian culture and society. For example, in informal situations, many Puerto Ricans in St. Croix speak a Spanglish-like combination of Puerto Rican Spanish and Crucian Creole English.

Migration from "down-island" (a local colloquial term for islands in the Lesser Antilles to the east and southeast) occurred mainly in the 1960s and 70s. In that period, agriculture declined as St. Croix's major industry, replaced by tourism, alumina production, and oil refining. Jobs were plentiful in these industries and down-islanders came to St. Croix by the thousands. The demand for imported labor in St. Croix was exacerbated by the fact that many ancestral native Crucians, having acquired U.S. citizenship decades earlier, migrated to the mainland U.S. to pursue educational and career opportunities. Many down-islanders made St. Croix their permanent home, while others relocated to the mainland U.S. or returned to their native countries. Most down-islanders came from St. Kitts and Nevis, Antigua, St. Lucia, and Dominica, but people from every Anglophone Caribbean nation can be found on St. Croix. Down-islanders and their St. Croix-born offspring form most of St. Croix's middle class, which has dwindled in size since the 2008 global recession.

Down-island migration to St. Croix is most commonly thought of as a mid-20th century phenomenon brought upon by American immigration policy, but people of both European and African descent from the nearby islands of Anguilla, St. Martin, Sint Eustatius, Saba, St. Kitts, Nevis, Antigua, and Montserrat have been migrating to St. Croix since the 1600s. Many ancestral native Crucians also share family ties with Barbados, as Bajans were heavily recruited to St. Croix to work on sugar plantations in the late 19th century.

Continental Americans, although small in number in comparison with Caribbean immigrants, have also been part of the St. Croix community. Most reside on the island's east end, and they tend to work in tourism, real estate, and legal professions. Many are temporary residents or retirees.

Arab Palestinians have been an influential part of the local economy since the 1960s, when they first started to migrate to St. Croix to set up shops, supermarkets, and gas stations.

In the 21st century, waves of migration to St. Croix have included people from the Dominican Republic, Haiti, Jamaica, the Philippines, and various South American nations. St. Croix's history of migration has sometimes caused tensions between immigrants and Crucians whose ancestry on the island dates back for generations. Tensions have subsided to some extent in recent years, mainly due to intermarriage among Crucians and other Caribbean peoples. In the late 1990s, many people supported legislation to define as a "native U.S. Virgin Islander" anyone who could trace their ancestry on the island to 1927, the year in which U.S. Virgin Islanders were granted U.S. citizenship. This effort by a select group of nationalist senators failed after much public outcry and controversy. It was learned that most native-born U.S. Virgin Islanders would not qualify as "native" under the proposed legislation, as their immigrant ancestors had arrived later than 1927, but thousands of Danish citizens would have qualified.

In 2009, the proposed U.S. Virgin Islands Constitution proposed by the Fifth Constitutional Convention established three definitions of U.S. Virgin Islanders: "Ancestral Native Virgin Islander"—those with ancestral ties (and their descendants); "Native Virgin Islander"—those born on the island (and their descendants); and "Virgin Islander"—any U.S. citizen who has resided in the territory for five years. The United States Congress rejected the proposed constitution in 2010 for violating the principle of equal rights for all citizens of the territory, "native" or not, and sent it back to the convention for further consideration.

At the 2020 U.S. census, St. Croix's population was 41,004, and its population living in households was 39,442. Of its population living in households, 51.6% were born in the U.S. Virgin Islands; 15.6% were born in the United States; 3.9% were born in U.S. Island Area or Puerto Rico; and 29.0% were born elsewhere. Of those born elsewhere, 91.4% were born in the Caribbean; 3.0% were born in Asia; 2.5% were born in Europe; 1.9% were born in Central America or South America; and 1.2% were born elsewhere.

Place of birth for St. Croix population in households (2020)
Place of birth	Number	Percentage
U.S. Virgin Islands	20,366	51.6%
United States	6,098	15.5%
Caribbean	10,443	26.5%
U.S. Island Area or Puerto Rico	1,555	3.9%
Asia	342	0.9%
Europe	282	0.7%
Central America and South America	222	0.6%
Elsewhere	135	0.3%

== Subdivisions ==
For census and planning purposes, St. Croix is divided into the following subdistricts (with population per the 2020 U.S. census):

- Anna's Hope Village (pop. 3,282)
- Christiansted (pop. 1,866)
- East End (pop. 2,336)
- Frederiksted (pop. 2,303)
- Northcentral (pop. 4,197)
- Northwest (pop. 3,431)
- Sion Farm (pop. 10,332)
- Southcentral (pop. 7,415)
- Southwest (pop. 5,842)

Historically, St. Croix, like the rest of the Virgin Islands, had been divided into quarters, with these further divided into estates. These were used for census purposes until 1980 until they were replaced by the subdistricts above, and estates are still commonly used for navigation, writing addresses, and discussing real estate.

== Language ==
English has been the dominant language on St. Croix since the 1700s and the official language since 1917, when the United States purchased the Danish West Indies. Previously, the official language was Danish, but it was not widely spoken. Other languages spoken throughout St. Croix's colonial history have included Irish, Scots, Spanish, and French, as well as a now-extinct Dutch Creole spoken by St. Thomas and St. John-born people living in St. Croix, as well as the local Creole English that still exists today.

Known on the island as Crucian, Virgin Islands Creole English is spoken by the majority of the population in informal situations. Spanish is spoken by migrants from Puerto Rico and the Dominican Republic and their St. Croix-born offspring, and various French Creoles are spoken by St. Lucian, Dominican, and Haitian immigrants. Arabic is common among St. Croix's Arab Palestinian community. Immigrants from the Anglophone Caribbean who came to St. Croix after their formative years tend to speak the English creoles of their respective islands in informal situations, which are, for the most part, mutually intelligible with Virgin Islands Creole English.

Language spoken at home (by population 5 years and over in households)
Language	Number	Percentage
English only	27,959	69.8%
Spanish	13,807	17.2%
French, Haitian Creole, or Cajun	7,101	8.8%
Other languages	3,349	4.2%

== Religion ==
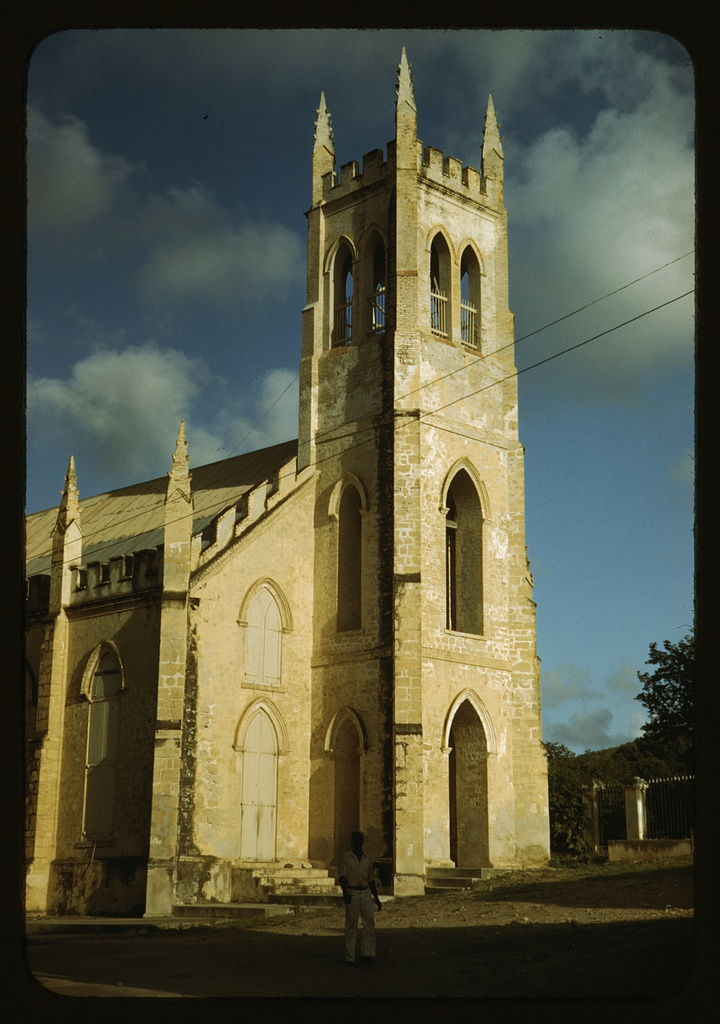
St. John's Anglican Church, Christiansted

Christianity is St. Croix's predominant religion; the island has been called the "Land of Churches" for the approximately 150 churches that serve its 50,000 residents.

Protestant denominations are the most prevalent, but there is also a significant Roman Catholic presence due to St. Croix's large Hispanic population, as well as Irish influence during the Danish colonial period. Anglican, Methodist, Moravian, Presbyterian, Pentecostal, and Seventh-day Adventists are among the Protestant denominations prevalent on the island. There are also Jehovah's Witnesses and members of the Church of Jesus Christ of Latter-day Saints.

As in most of the Caribbean, various forms of Rastafari are practiced on the island. Islam is prevalent among the Arab Palestinian community, and there is a Jewish presence as well. Hinduism and Islam are also practiced by the Indian population.

== Economy ==
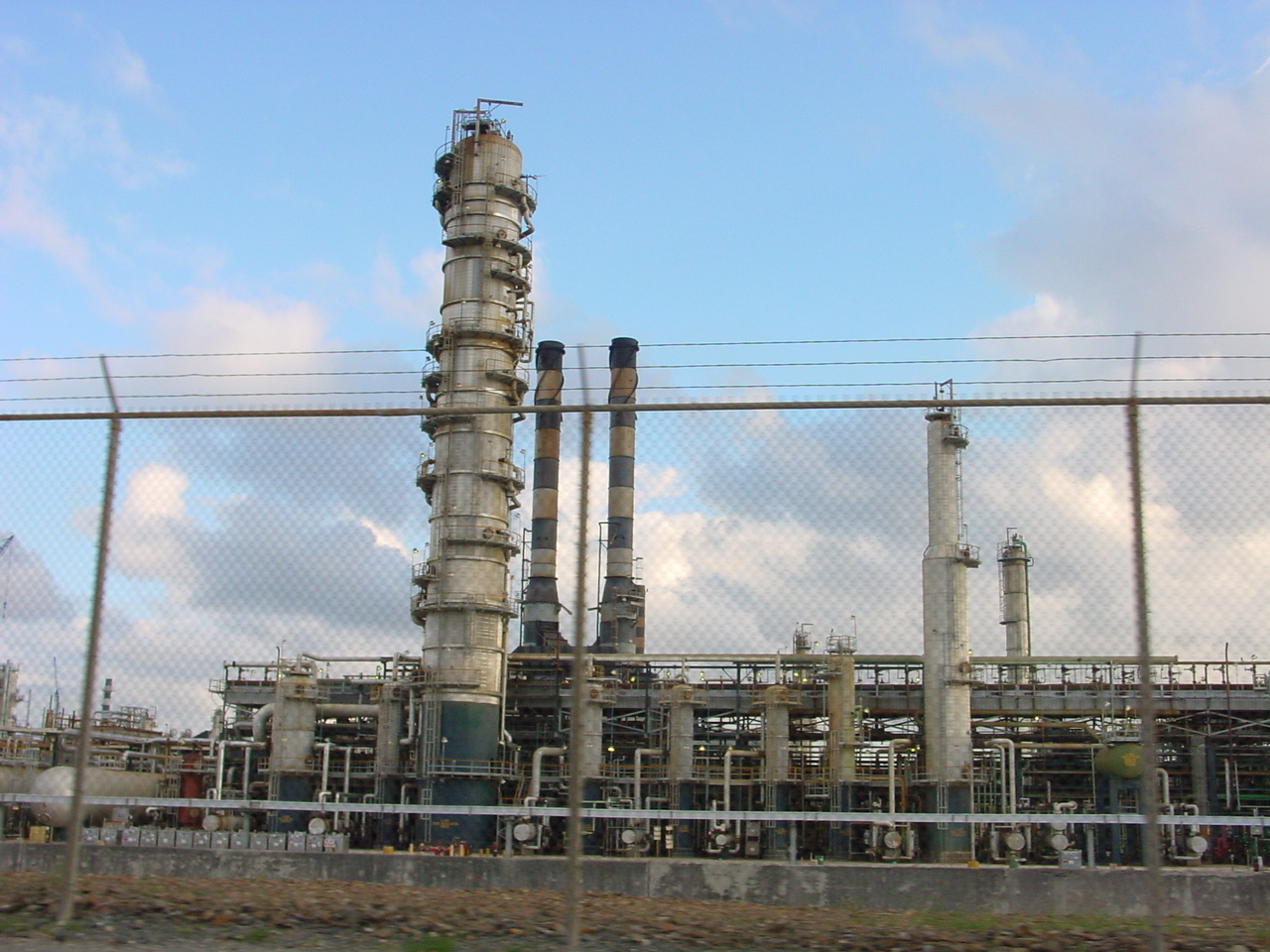
HOVENSA oil refinery

St. Croix was once an agricultural powerhouse. Today, tourism is St. Croix's main source of revenue. A number of other industries contribute to its economy, including the refining of oil and the distilling of rum.

=== Agriculture ===
The Taino people were the first to develop organized agriculture on St. Croix, cultivating crops like cassava, potatoes, and corn.

During the island's colonial period, St. Croix was an agricultural powerhouse in the Caribbean. The island's biggest exports were sugarcane, cotton, and tobacco–planted, harvested, and processed by enslaved Africans. Sugarcane was the island's primary export in the 18th and 19th centuries. With more than 150 sugar mills, St. Croix was one of the wealthiest sugar islands in the West Indies.

After the abolition of slavery in 1848, St. Croix remained a predominantly agricultural society. That period ended with the rapid industrialization of the island's economy in the 1960s.

=== Oil ===
St. Croix has been the location of one of the world's biggest oil refineries. In 1966, Hess Oil Virgin Islands Corporation (HOVIC), a division of the U.S.-based Hess Corporation, began operation on the island. In 1998, Hovensa LLC took over the refinery operatorship. Hovensa was a limited liability company owned and operated by HOVIC and Petroleos de Venezuela, SA (PDVSA), Venezuela's national oil company. The refinery's name changed to HOVENSA. Gas prices on St. Croix were slightly higher than average than in the continental U.S.

On January 18, 2012, Hovensa announced that its refinery would be permanently shut down. This had a major adverse effect on the economy of St. Croix and the entire U.S. Virgin Islands, as the refinery employed 1,200 residents and 950 contractors. Almost a decade later, the refinery restarted in January 2021; but it shut down again in May 2021 due to unsafe emissions.

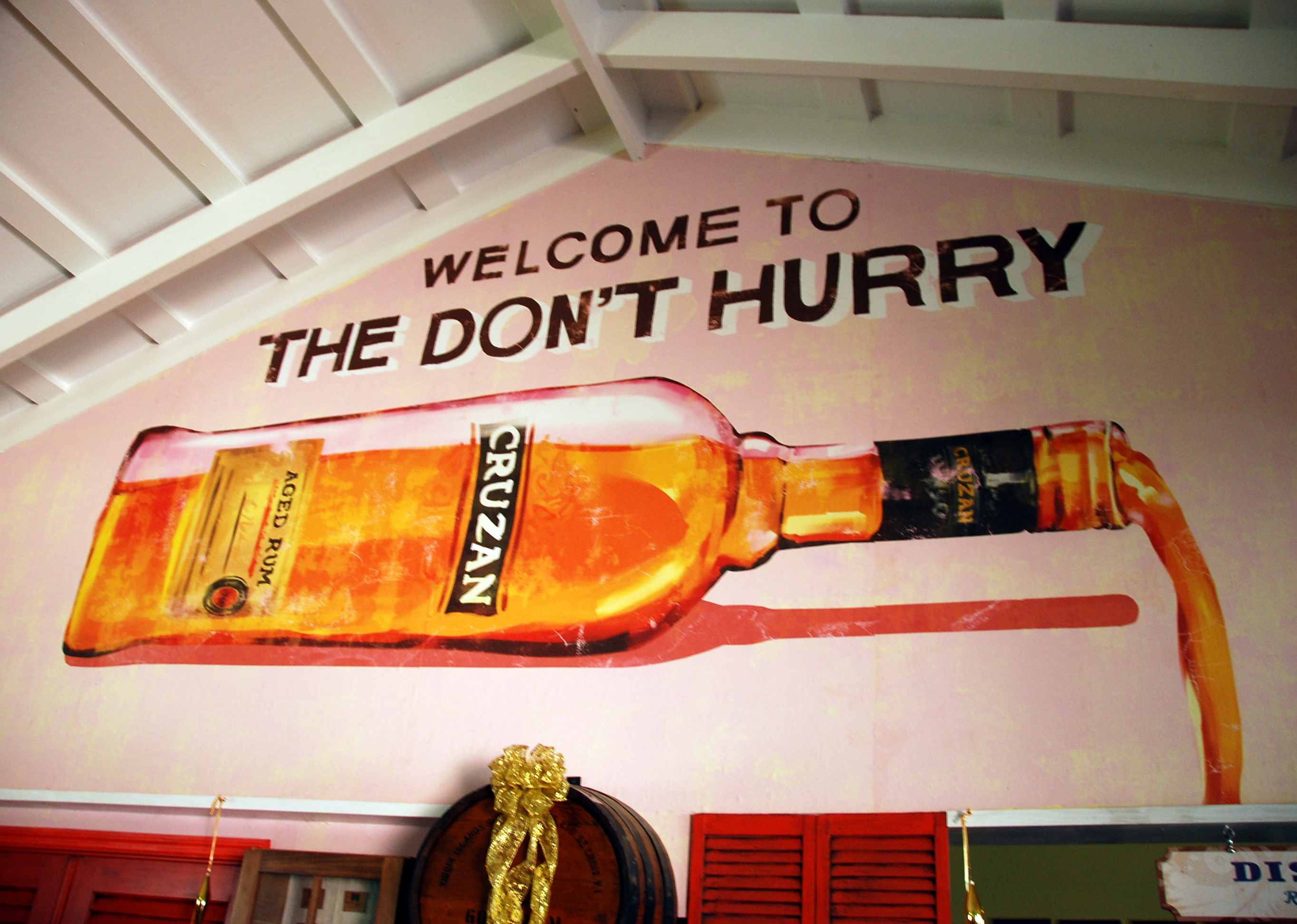
Cruzan Rum Distillery

=== Rum ===
St. Croix is also home to the Cruzan Rum Distillery, makers of Cruzan Rum, a brand of Beam Suntory, Inc. The Cruzan Rum Distillery was founded in 1760 as Estate Diamond, and for many years used locally grown sugar cane to produce a single "dark"-style rum. It now imports sugar cane molasses from other countries in the region, primarily the Dominican Republic and South America. In recent years, Cruzan Rum, along with Bacardi from Puerto Rico and Gosling's from Bermuda, has contributed to the resurgence of "single-barrel", super-premium rum. Cruzan Estate Rums has won more than 30 Spirit Awards. Cruzan Estate Diamond Rum (aged five years in American oak barrels) and Cruzan Single Barrel Estate Rum (aged 12 years in American oak barrels) are two examples.

Diageo completed construction of a new distillery on a 26-acre industrial site next to the HOVENSA refinery. The new distillery produces Captain Morgan Rum. Diageo's entrance into the U.S. Virgin Islands rum industry has been controversial. The cash-strapped U.S. Virgin Islands government secured $250 million in bonds for the plant, about which the Puerto Rican government has bitterly complained.

=== Tourism ===
Today, tourism makes up St. Croix's primary industries, accounting for 60% of the U.S. Virgin Islands' GDP. The island is a popular cruise port. In 2023–24, the cruise ship port at Frederiksted received 3–8 ships per month. Additionally, hotels and resorts, restaurants and bars, and tours and activities bring in revenue. Popular tourist activities include swimming, sailing, diving, snorkeling, and golf.

== Transportation ==
Cars on the island are driven on the left side of the road, but nearly all of them are left-hand drive. This has proven difficult for new residents and visitors from right-hand traffic locales such as the mainland U.S., the French and Dutch West Indies, the Dominican Republic, and Puerto Rico. Roads have numerous potholes.

The Virgin Islands Department of Public Works operates a public bus service, Virgin Islands Transit, or VITRAN.

In addition to taxis and buses, St. Croix has shared taxis, locally known as "taxi buses" (also found on the other U.S. Virgin Islands). Taxi buses are full-sized vans running from Frederiksted to Christiansted. They are privately owned and operated; they do not follow a regular schedule and have no set stops. People simply wait by the side of the road until a taxi bus approaches, then flag the driver down by waving. Passengers can get out anywhere along the route. Taxi buses are not metered and are required by law to charge a flat rate of $2.50, regardless of where a rider gets on and off. Taxis to specific locations are much more expensive and are typically used by tourists.

Ferry service to St. Thomas restarted in 2017. The QE IV Ferry makes one trip per day departing from Gallows Bay, Christiansted, to Charlotte Amalie, St. Thomas. The journey takes 2.5 hours and costs $60. The QE IV Ferry does not run during hazardous weather conditions. Some ferry companies based in St. Thomas and St. John sometimes operate St. Croix-to-St. Thomas service for special occasions, such as the St. Croix Agricultural Fair in February, Virgin Islands Carnival, Crucian Christmas Carnival, and horse races.

The Henry E. Rohlsen International Airport serves St. Croix with regular flights from the U.S. mainland, Puerto Rico, and the Eastern Caribbean. Seaplanes, operated by Seaborne Airlines, fly from St. Croix to St. Thomas, departing and arriving in Christiansted Harbor.

Though St. Croix is a U.S. territory, the U.S. Virgin Islands are maintained as a free port in a separate customs zone. Therefore, travelers to and from the contiguous United States and Puerto Rico, including U.S. citizens, must clear U.S. customs. U.S. travelers do not need to present a passport to entry the U.S. Virgin Islands, but may need to provide proof of citizenship or nationality upon departure. The immigration status of non-U.S. citizens may be verified during this process.

== Education ==
The St. Croix School District operates a number of public schools in St. Croix. There are also multiple private schools, including St. Croix Montessori, Star Apple Montessori School, The Good Hope Country Day School, Arizona Academy, St. Mary's Catholic School, Free Will Baptist, St. Croix SDA School, and The Manor School. The island's only colleges are the University of the Virgin Islands, St. Croix campus and Barry University, which operates a physician assistant training program.

== Culture ==
=== Festivals ===
The island's largest festival, Crucian Christmas Carnival, is celebrated on St. Croix throughout late December and early January. Another significant festival is the Agricultural and Food Fair, held in mid-February.

Several times a year, there is a nighttime festival in Christiansted called "Jump-Up" and a monthly event called "Sunset Jazz" in Frederiksted, where local jazz musicians play on Frederiksted Beach. Every year on the Saturday before Mardi Gras, there is a local Mardi Croix parade and a dog parade through the North Shore.

The St. Croix Half Ironman Triathlon is held in the first week of May. It includes a 1.2-mile (1.9 km) swim, a 56-mile (90 km) bike ride, and a 13.1-mile (21.1 km) run. Because the bicycle route includes a ride up an extremely steep hill known as "The Beast", this triathlon is often nicknamed "Beauty and the Beast".

A costumed carnival dancer

Parade of costumed carnival dancers

A costumed carnival dancer

A costumed carnival dancer

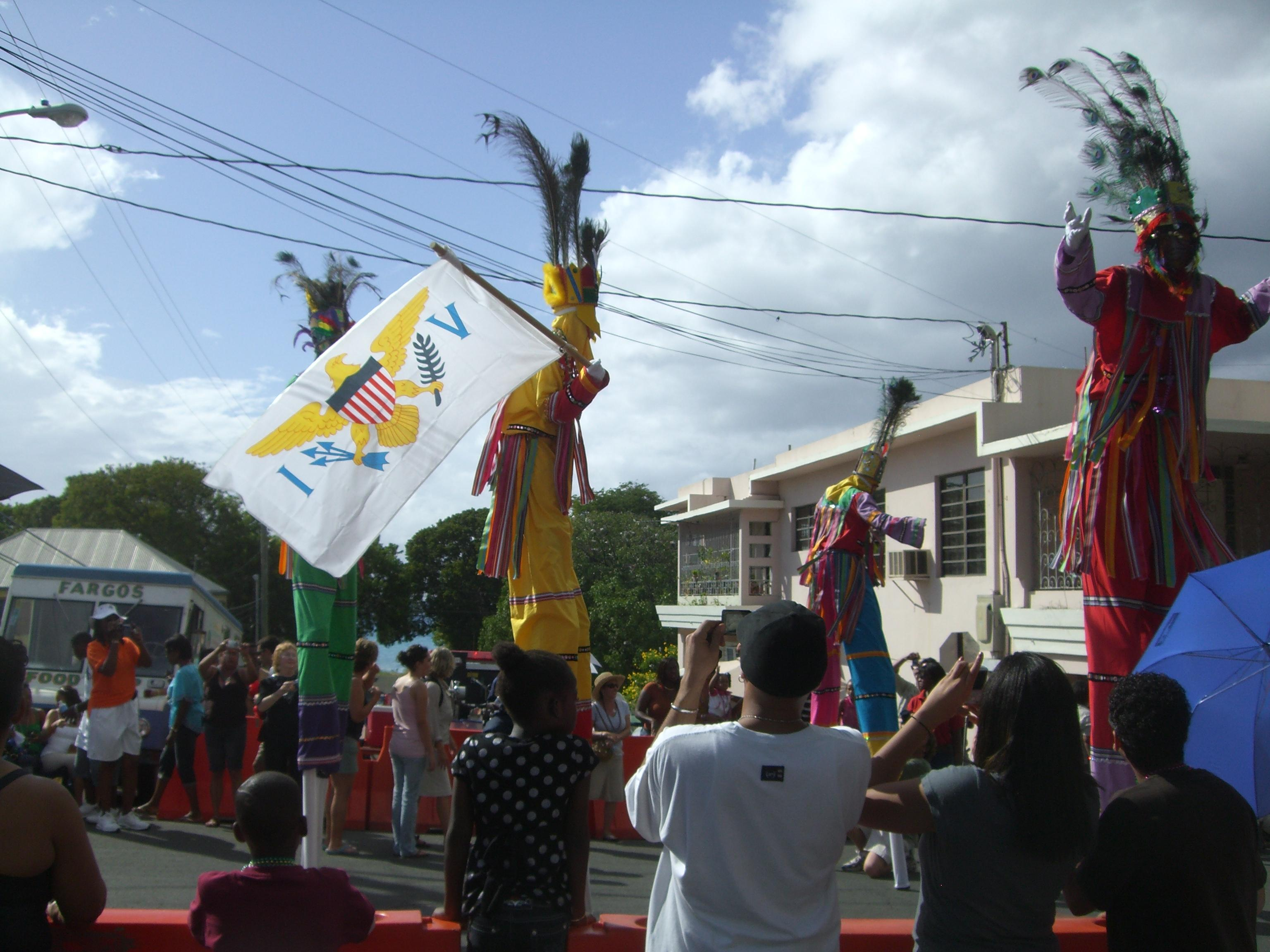
A Moko jumbie

== Points of interest ==
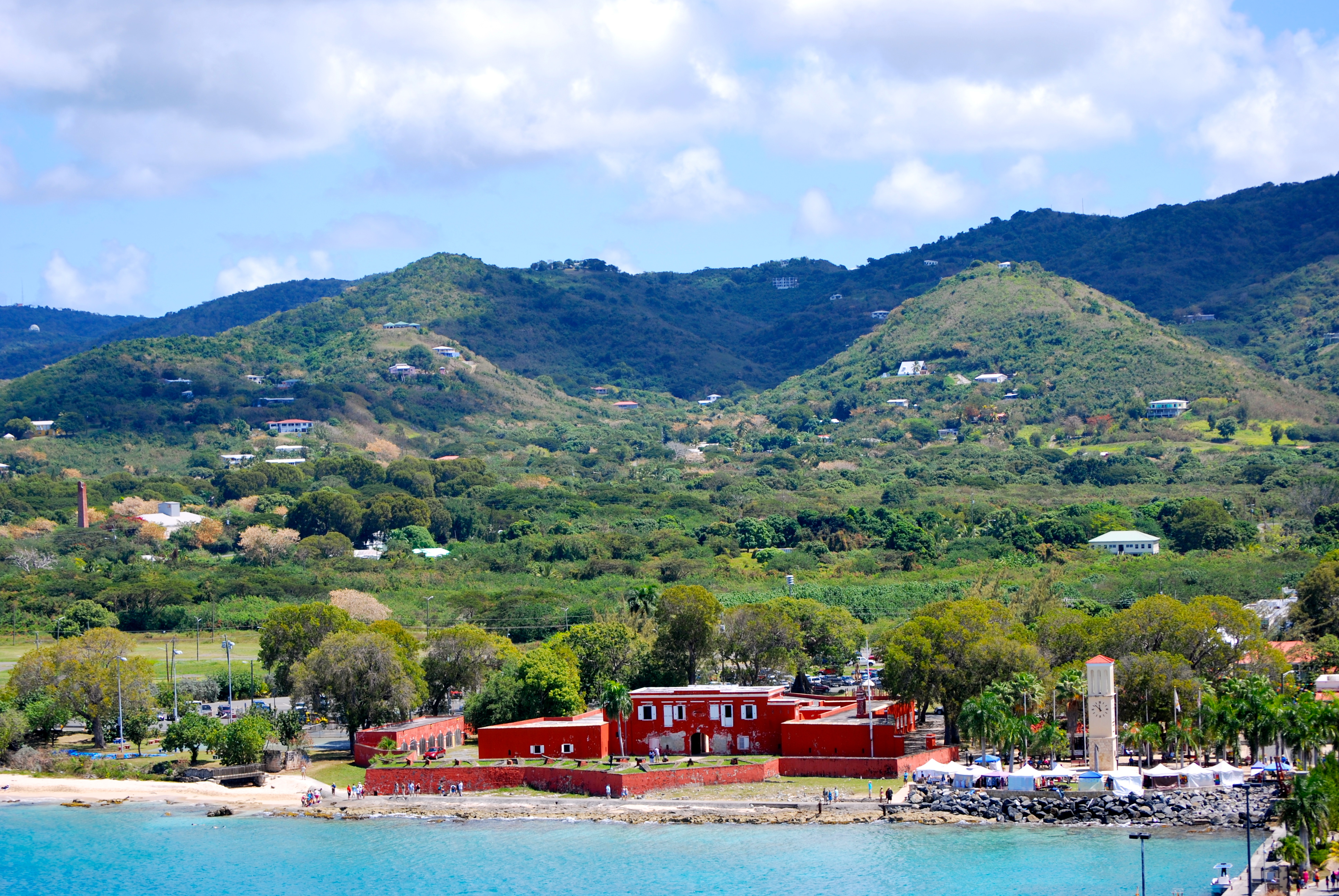
Fort Frederik in Frederiksted

Frederiksted maintains its Victorian era architecture and original seven-street-by-seven-street design, and has several historic structures. Among them are St. Patrick's Catholic Church, built in the 1840s, and its primary school, the Customs House; the 19th-century Apothecary; and many other buildings, some of which hurricanes have transformed into scenic ruins. Frederiksted operates at a more relaxed pace than most of the island, and is more lively during Carnival in January and whenever visiting cruise ships are in port.

Salt River Bay National Historical Park and Ecological Preserve contains the only known site where members of a Columbus expedition set foot on what is now U.S. territory. It also preserves upland watersheds, mangrove forests, and estuarine and marine environments that support threatened and endangered species. The site is marked by Fort Salé, an earthworks fortification from French occupation, dating to around 1617. The park preserves prehistoric and colonial-era archeological sites, including the Caribbean's only extant ball court. This is one of two sites on the island for bioluminescent bays (the other being Altona Lagoon).

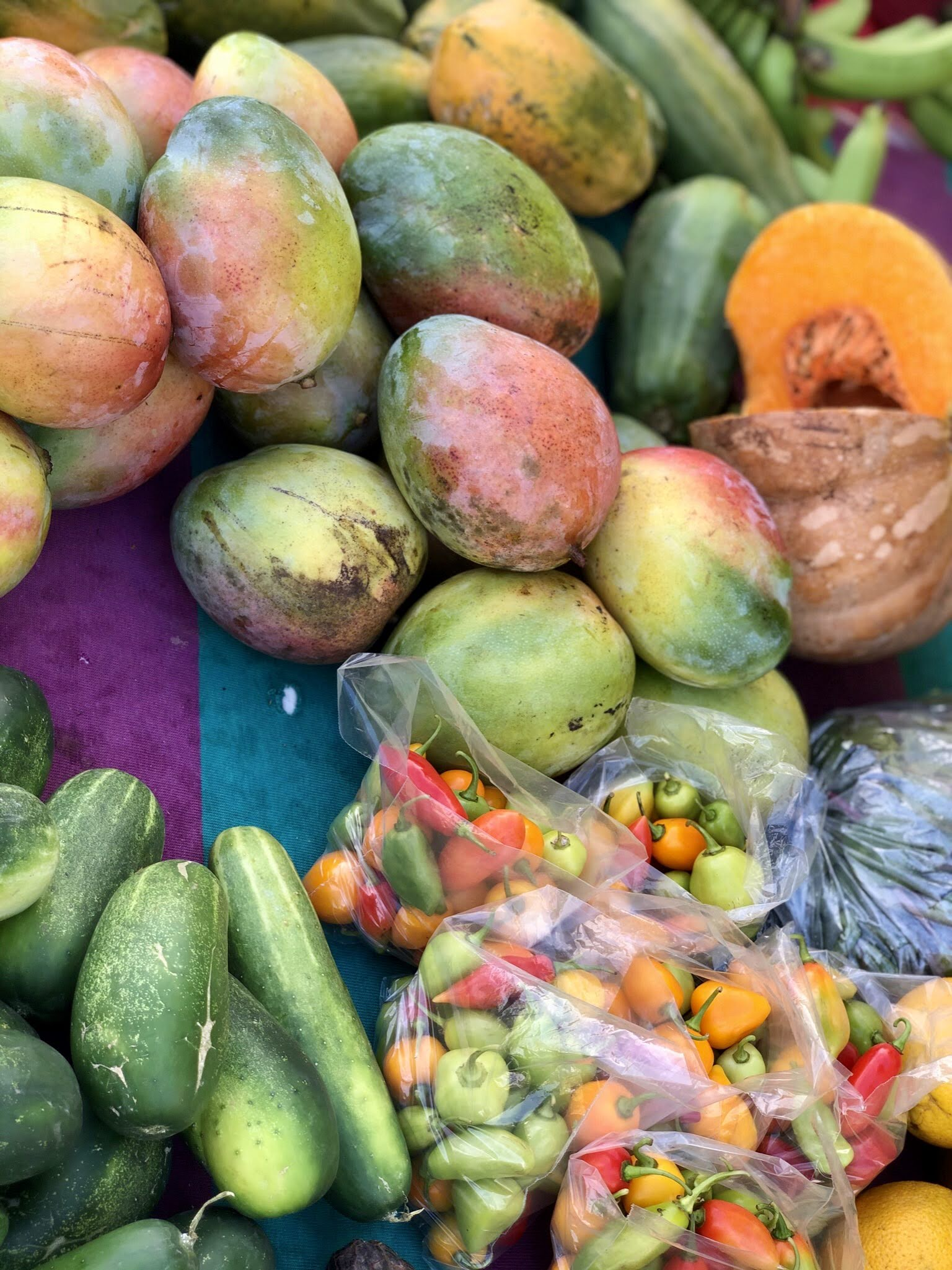
Farmer's market, St. Croix

Fort Christiansværn, built in 1749, and other buildings are maintained by the National Park Service as the Christiansted National Historic Site.

Buck Island Reef National Monument preserves a 176 acres (71 ha) island just north of St. Croix and the surrounding reefs. It is a popular destination for snorkelers. Buck Island maintains a U.S. Coast Guard weather station and is home to a student-monitored lemon shark breeding ground. Green Cay (pronounced green key) is a small island southwest of Buck Island managed by the U.S. Fish and Wildlife Service. It hosts a nearby reef popular among scuba divers and snorkelers, Tamarind Reef.

The farmer's market (1 Estate, Kingshill, 00850, St. Croix) offers local fruit and vegetables, as well as plants, local food, and juice. The outdoor vendors open every Saturday from 6 a.m. to 12 p.m., sometimes longer. The farmer's market is open year-round.

The St. Croix National Heritage Area was established by the National Heritage Area Act in 2022 to help preserve and promote historic and cultural sites across the island.

=== Scuba diving, snorkeling, and watersports ===
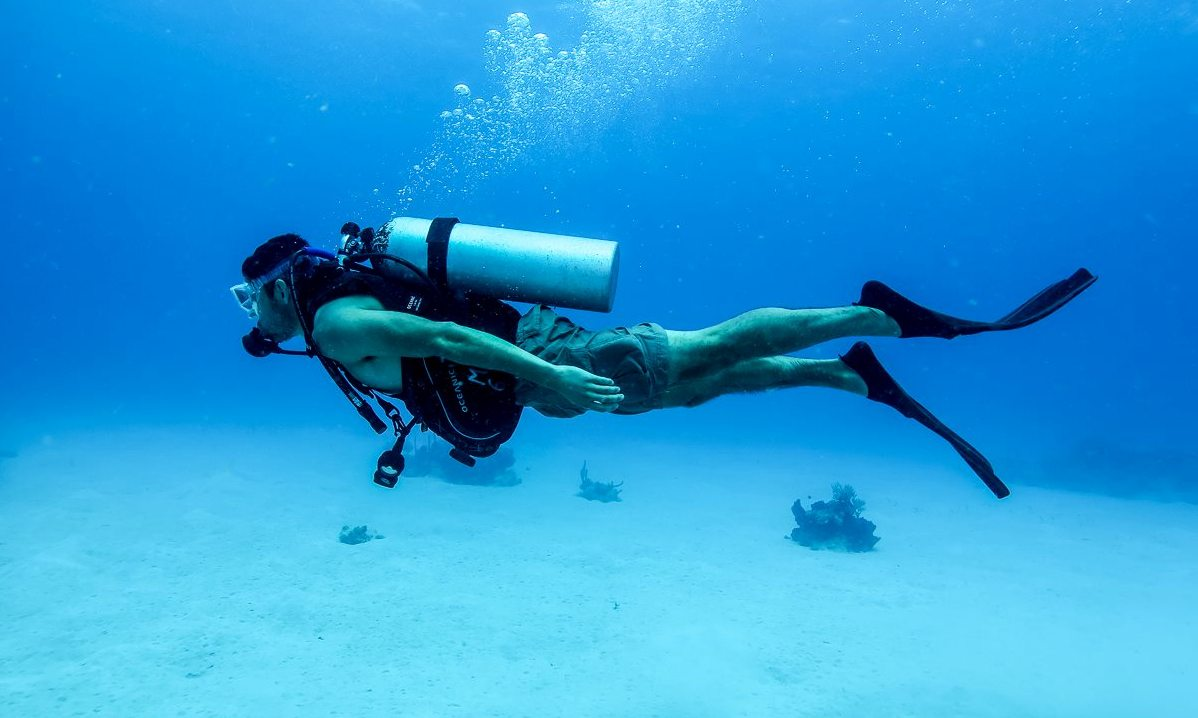
Scuba diving in St. Croix

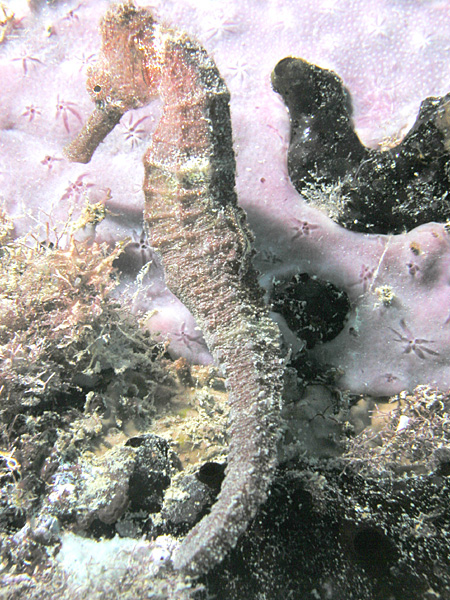
Seahorse at the pier in Frederiksted

The waters surrounding St. Croix are warm year-round, with temperatures ranging from 25 °C (77 °F) – 30 °C (86 °F), making it a popular destination for watersports including scuba diving, snorkeling, kayaking, paddleboarding, surfing, kite surfing, parasailing, jet skiing, fishing, and sailing. Two of the island's most popular underwater sites for scuba divers are the Frederiksted Pier and the drop-off into deep water at Salt River Bay National Historical Park and Ecological Preserve.

Frederiksted is known for reef diving and access to wreck diving. The island's western side has calm waters that allow snorkeling with access from the beach. Paddleboarding is popular near Frederiksted for the same reason. The Frederiksted Pier attracts scuba divers and snorkelers, as well as those who simply jump off it. The shallow water and sandy bottom around the pier are ideal for recreational diving by novice scuba divers in PADI Discover Scuba Diving programs (also called resort diving), for extended shore diving, night diving, and for underwater photography, especially of its abundant seahorse population.

A few hundred meters off the northern coast of the island, from Salt River to Cane Bay, the bottom drops suddenly into a deep trench, where coral reefs, abundant tropical fish, and migrant sea turtles may be observed. Kayaking is also popular in the Salt River.

Christiansted, a short distance from Buck Island and Green Cay, is a former capital of the Danish West Indies. It lies just east of the northern underwater drop-off and is protected by a reef.

=== Bioluminescent bays ===
There are two bioluminescent bays or bio bays on St. Croix. The most widely known and visited is at Salt River Bay National Historical Park and Ecological Preserve. The other is at Altona Lagoon. Bio bays are extremely rare; only seven year-round lagoons are known to exist in the Caribbean.

A combination of factors creates the necessary conditions for bioluminescence: red mangrove trees surround the water (the organisms have been related to mangrove forest, although mangrove is not necessarily associated with this species). A study at the Salt River bio bay is being conducted as of 2013 by faculty and students from the University of South Carolina, the University of North Carolina-Wilmington, and the University of the Virgin Islands. Their research focuses on analyzing quality and nutrient composition of the water, the distribution of a microorganism, the dinoflagellate Pyrodinium bahamense, that glows when the water is disturbed, and the abundance of "cysts", dormant dinoflagellates embedded in the sea floor.

A concurrent complementary study is being undertaken by the St. Croix Environmental Association in conjunction with Scripps Institution of Oceanography. It focuses on counting the photon density of the phenomenon over time and in various weather conditions. Water quality and taxonomic analysis from both studies will be shared and correlated to create one of the most thorough investigations of year-round bioluminescent bays to date.

St. Croix's two bio bays have very different characteristics. The one at Altona Lagoon is large but shallow, allowing one to see various marine life swimming and agitating the water, lighting it up. The bio bay at Salt River is smaller but deeper than Altona Lagoon. Because of its depth, it is also home to a second form of bioluminescence, Ctenophora, or comb-jellies, that are not found at Altona Lagoon.

A third bioluminescent organism is also found in Salt River. A species of marine Odontosyllis fireworm performs its brilliant green mating ritual within 57 hours after the full moon, females rising to the surface and leaving a luminescent green puddle for the males to race through, fertilizing the eggs.

=== Protected areas ===
- Buck Island Reef National Monument, managed by the National Park Service (a federal agency)
- Christiansted National Historic Site, managed by the National Park Service (a federal agency)
- Green Cay National Wildlife Refuge, managed by the US Fish and Wildlife Service (a federal agency)
- Salt River Bay National Historical Park and Ecological Preserve, co-managed by the Territory of the Virgin Islands and the National Park Service (a federal agency)
- Sandy Point National Wildlife Refuge, managed by the US Fish and Wildlife Service (a federal agency)
- Point Udall
- St. Croix East End Marine Park: managed by the Government of the Virgin Islands through the Department of Planning and Natural Resources' Division of Coastal Zone Management
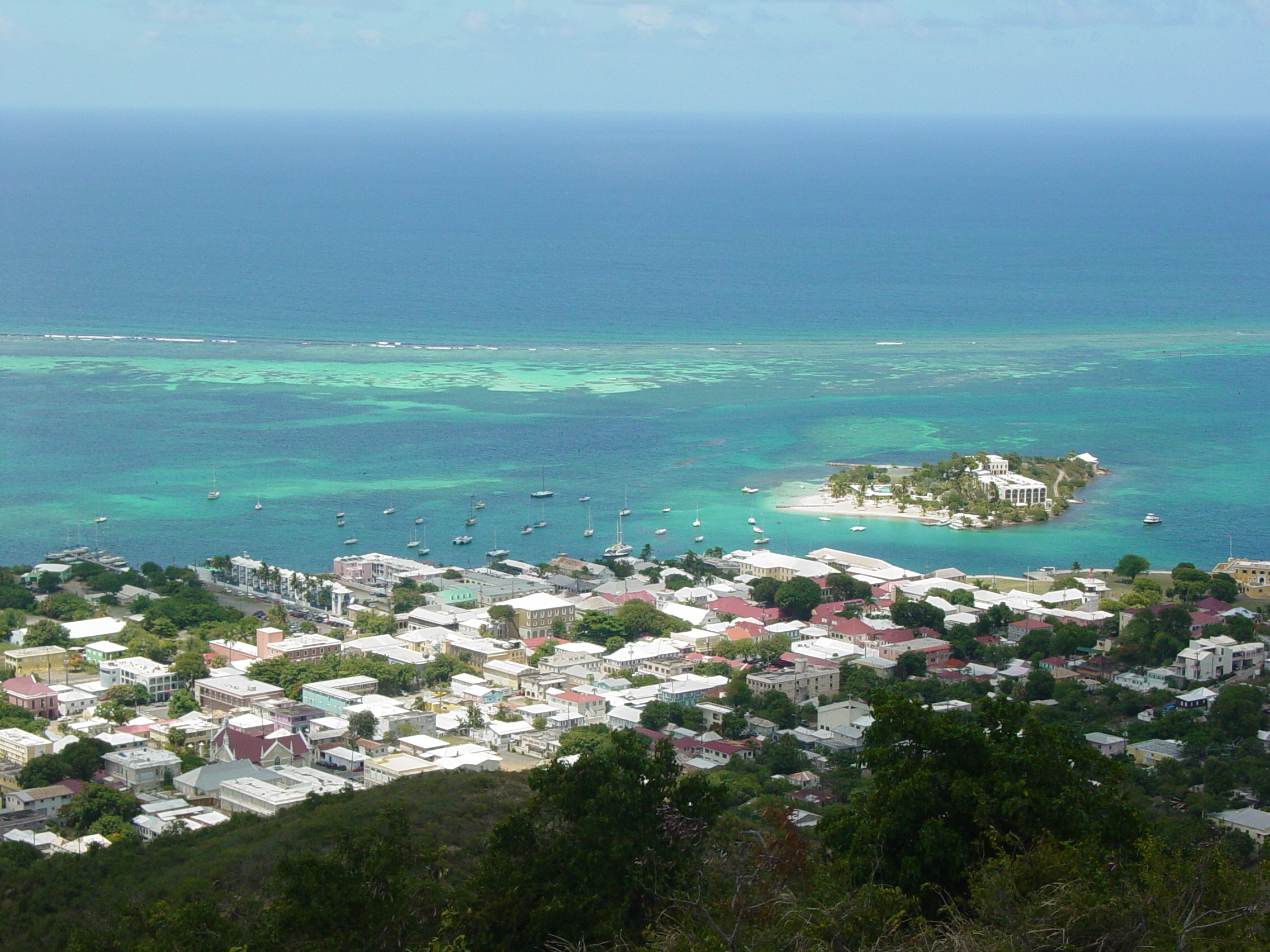
Christiansted, looking north.

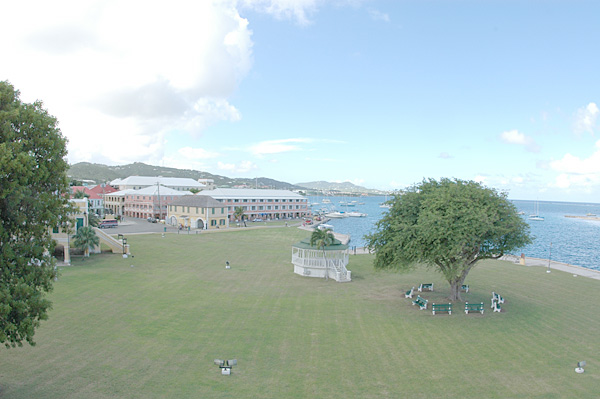
Downtown Christiansted and harbor

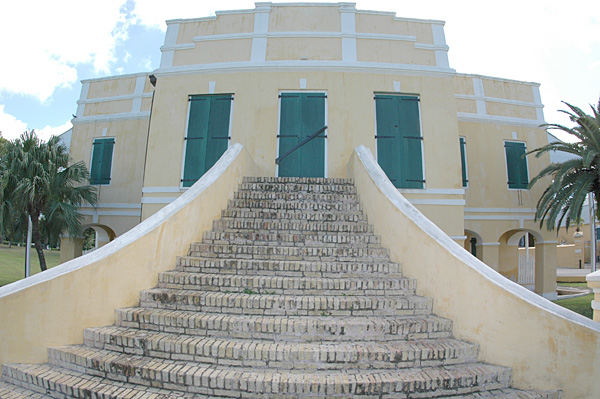
Old Danish Customs House, Christiansted

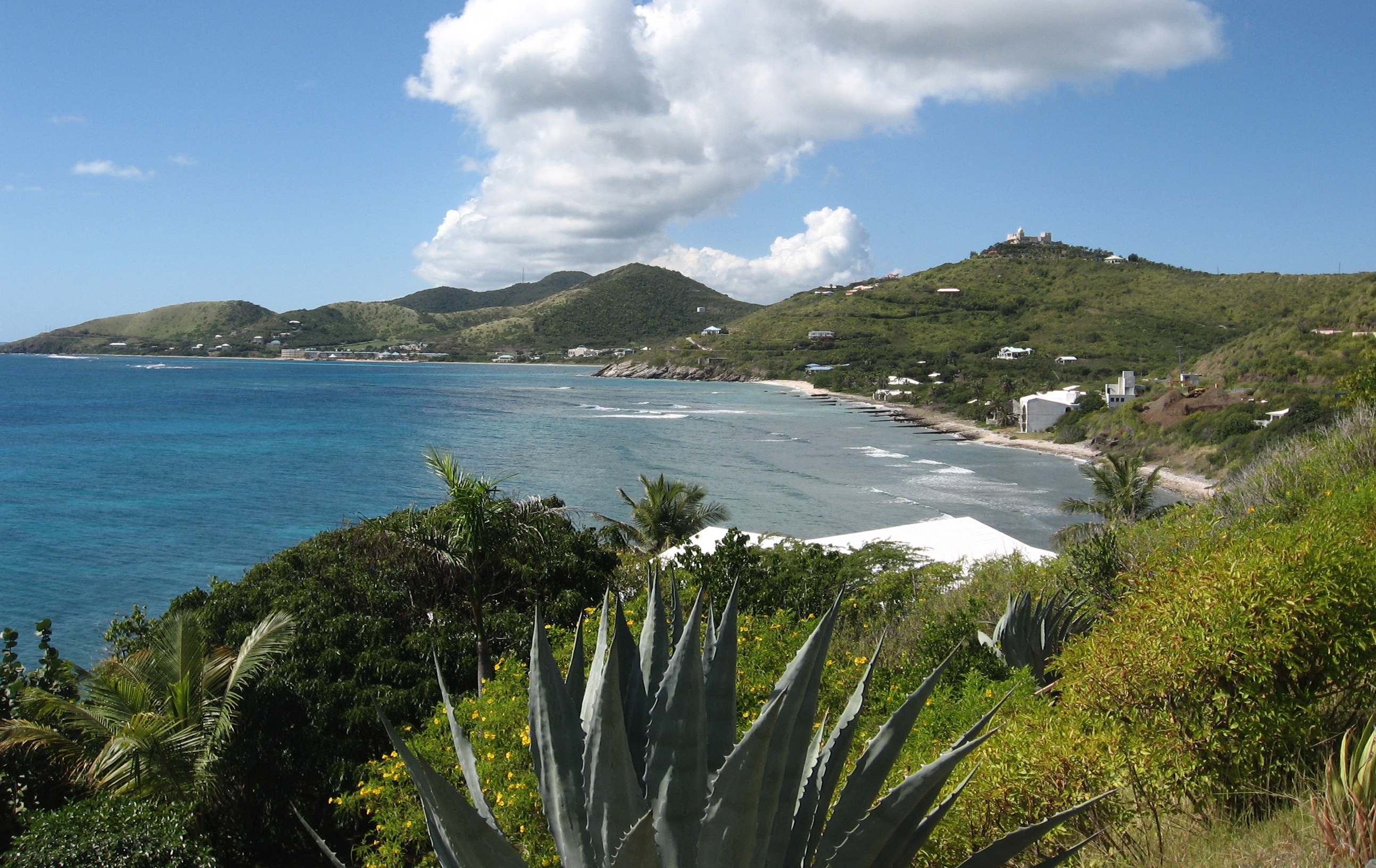
East End

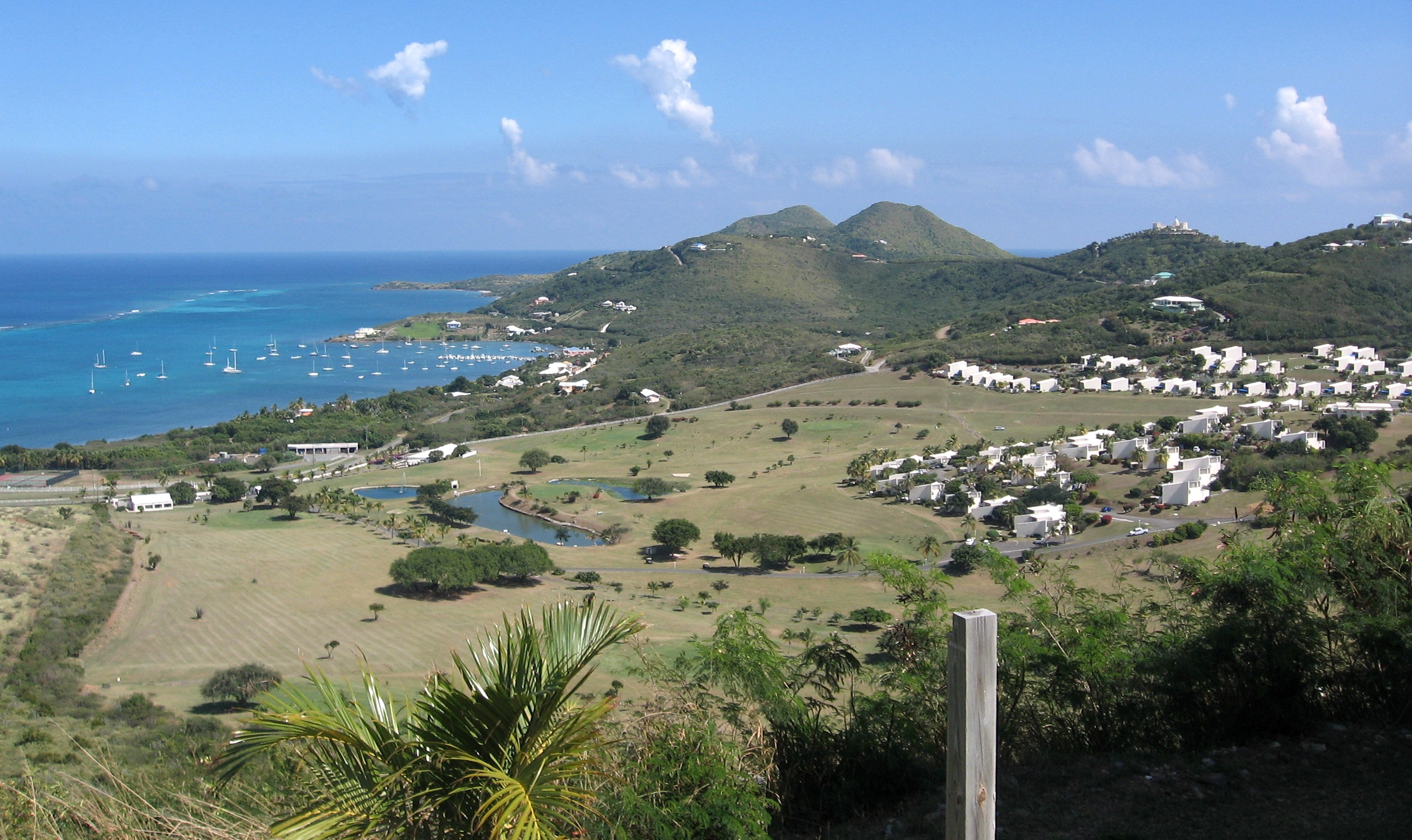
East End

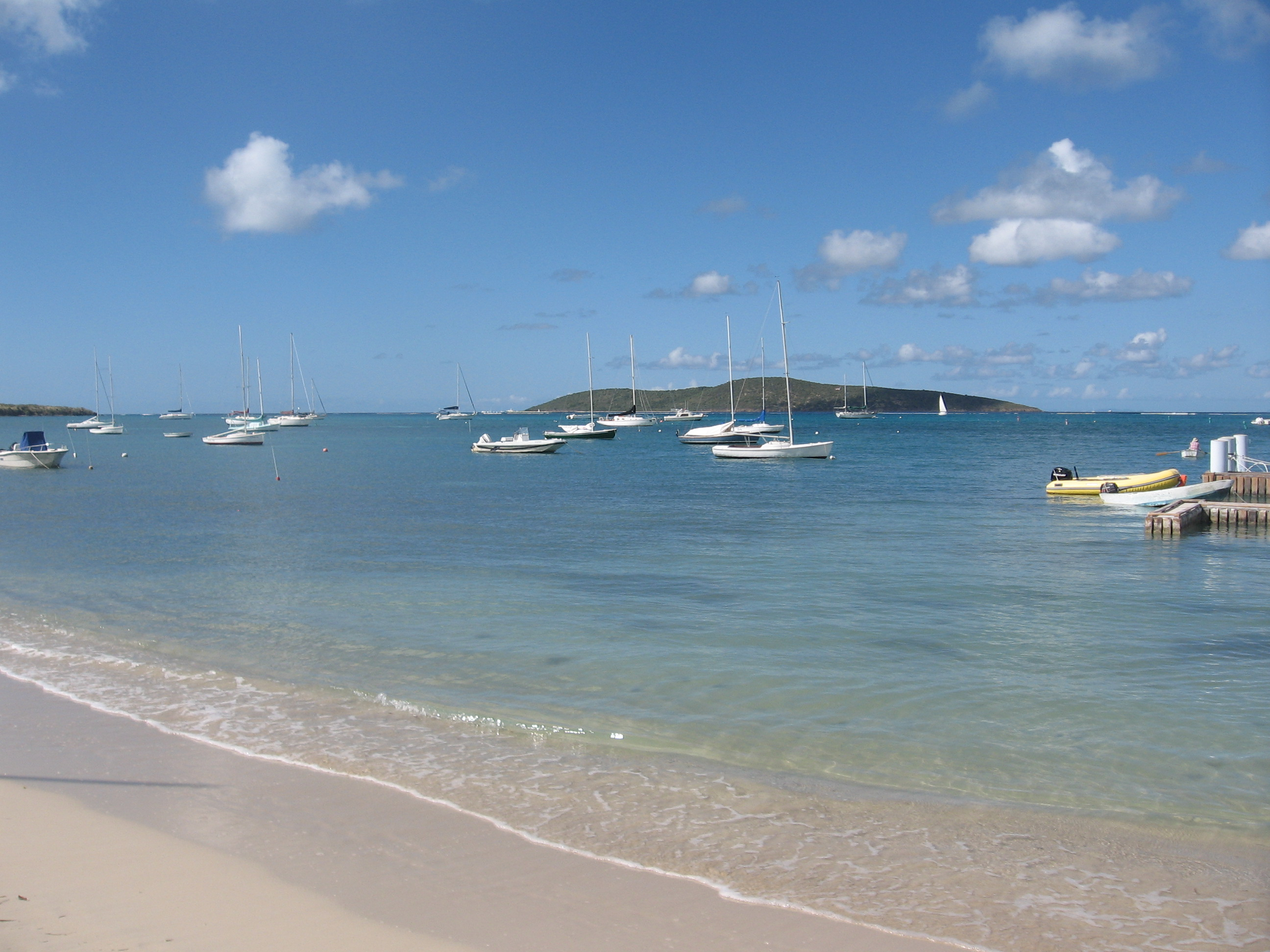
Teague Bay Beach

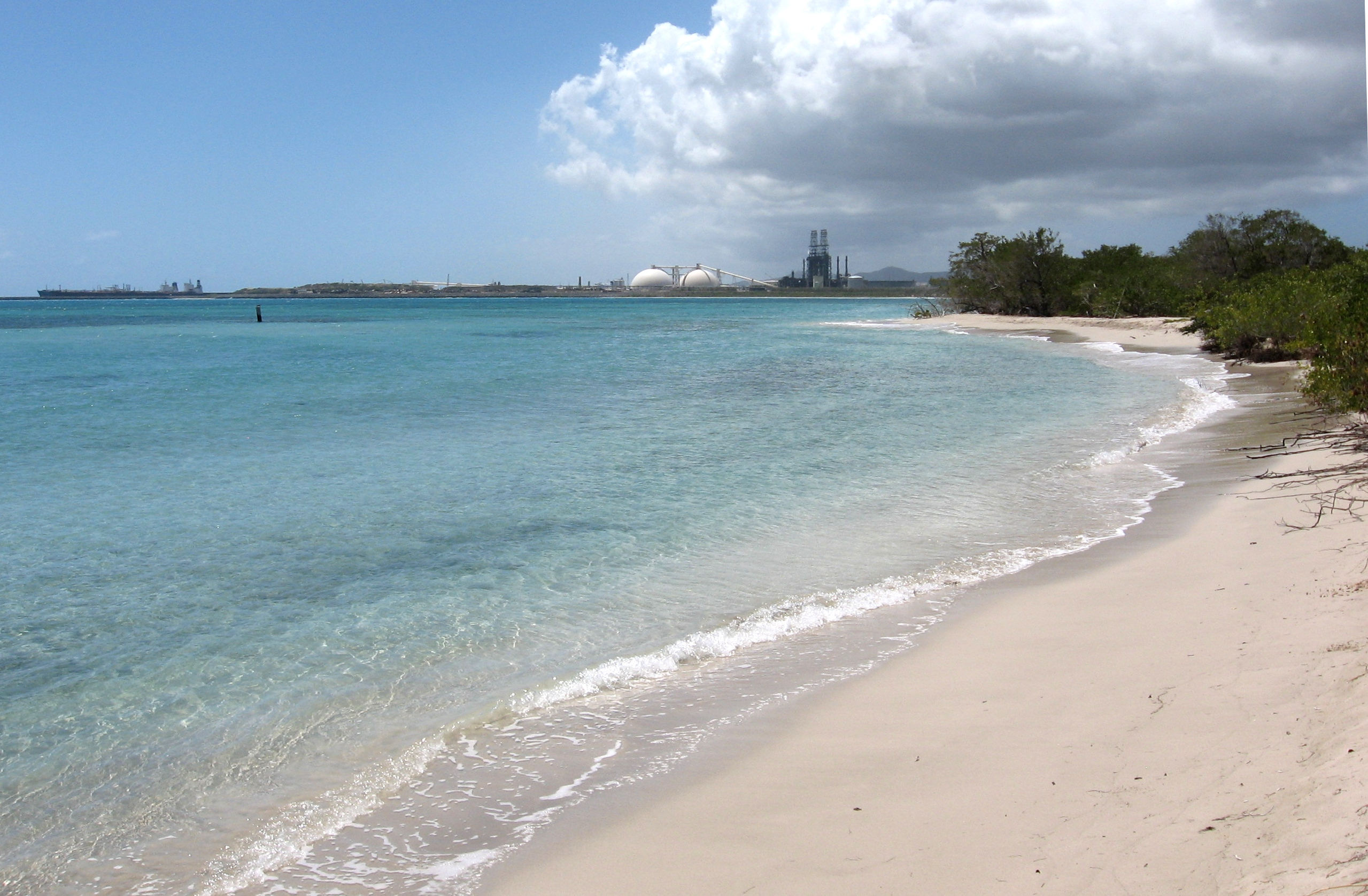
Canegarden Bay Beach

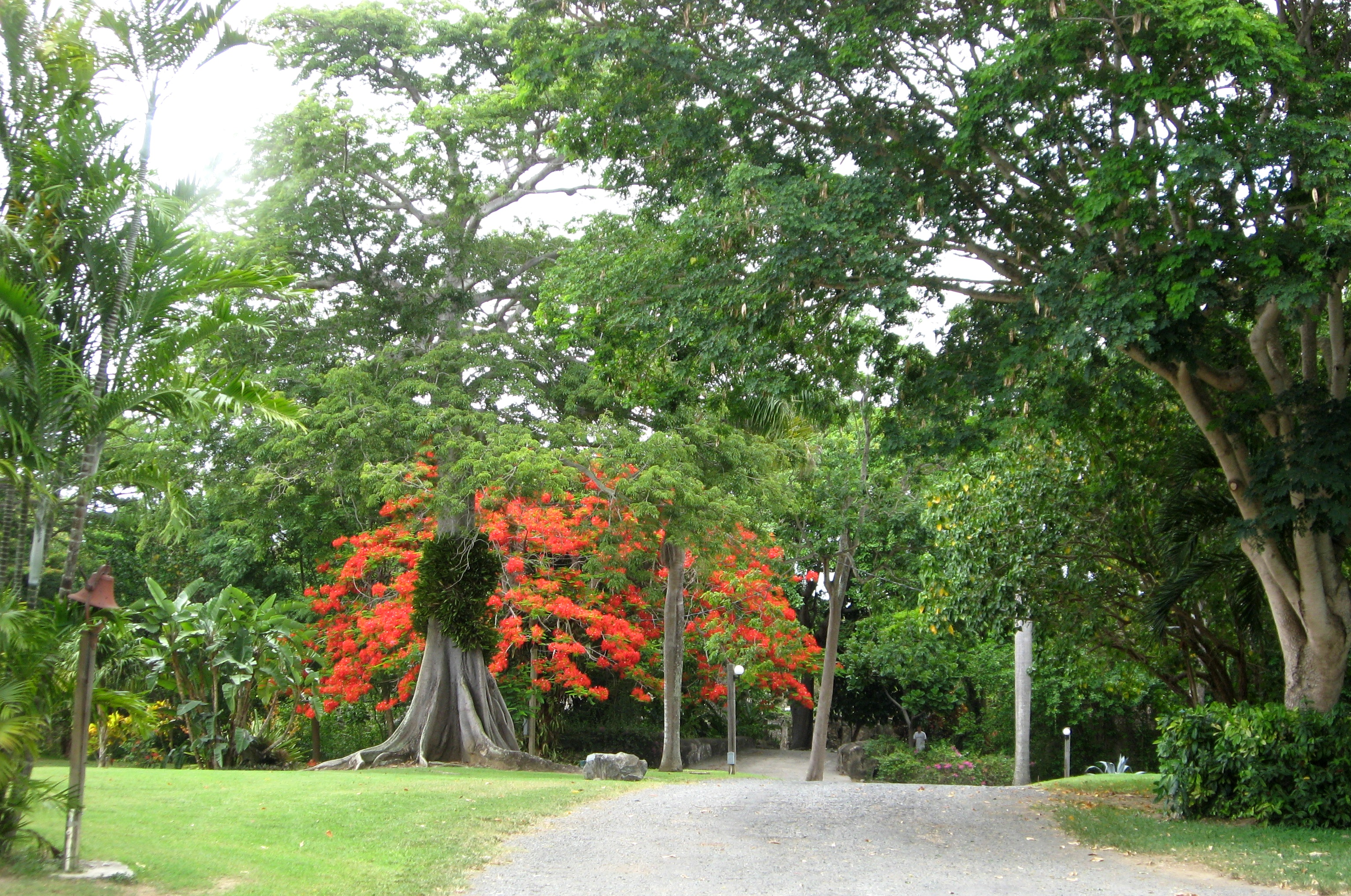
St. George Village Botanical Gardens

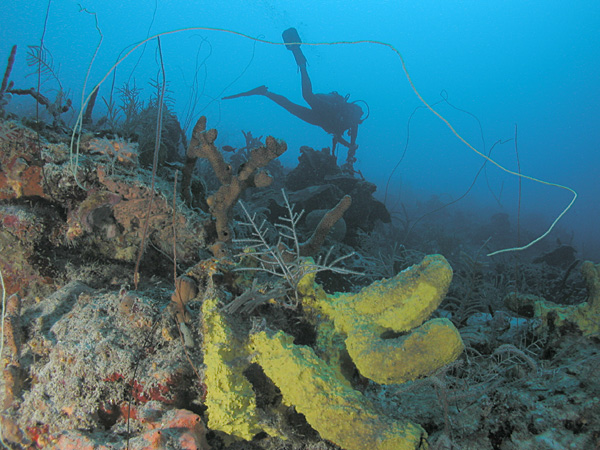
Scuba diver and sponges, Cane Bay wall

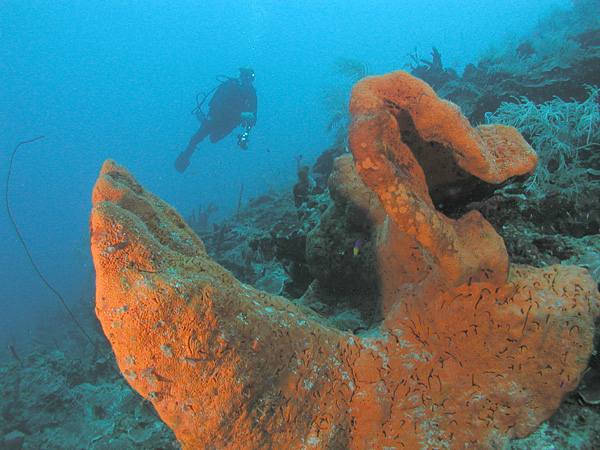
Scuba diver and sponges, Cane Bay wall

== Notable people ==
=== Arts ===
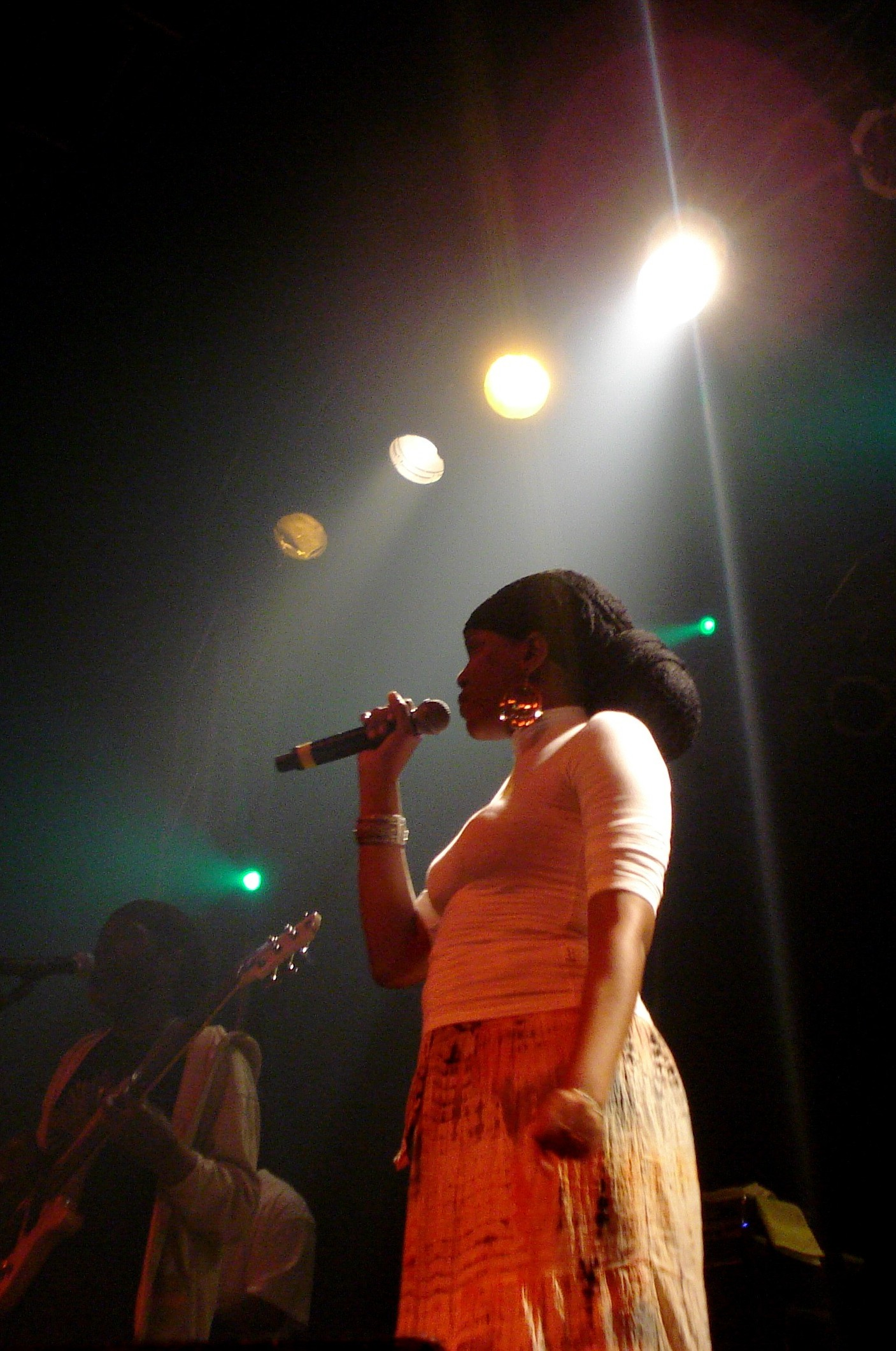
Dezarie, 2010

- Adassa (born 1987), reggaeton singer and songwriter
- Bennie Benjamin (1907–1989), musician, songwriter
- Omari K. Chancellor, actor and filmmaker
- De Apostle (born ca.1978), reggae singer-songwriter
- Dezarie (born ca.1980), reggae singer
- Jack Gantos (born 1951), author (mentioned in Hole in My Life)
- Jimmy Hamilton (1917–1994), American jazz musician, died in Saint Croix
- Rea Irvin (1881–1972), American illustrator, art director on The New Yorker magazine, died in Saint Croix
- Audre Lorde (1934–1992), American poet and feminist, died in Saint Croix
- Midnite (active 1989–2015), roots reggae band
- Henry S. Whitehead (1882–1932), American author of horror fiction and fantasy; archdeacon in St Croix from 1921 to 1929
- Mike Yard (born ca.1970), contributor on The Nightly Show

=== Sport ===
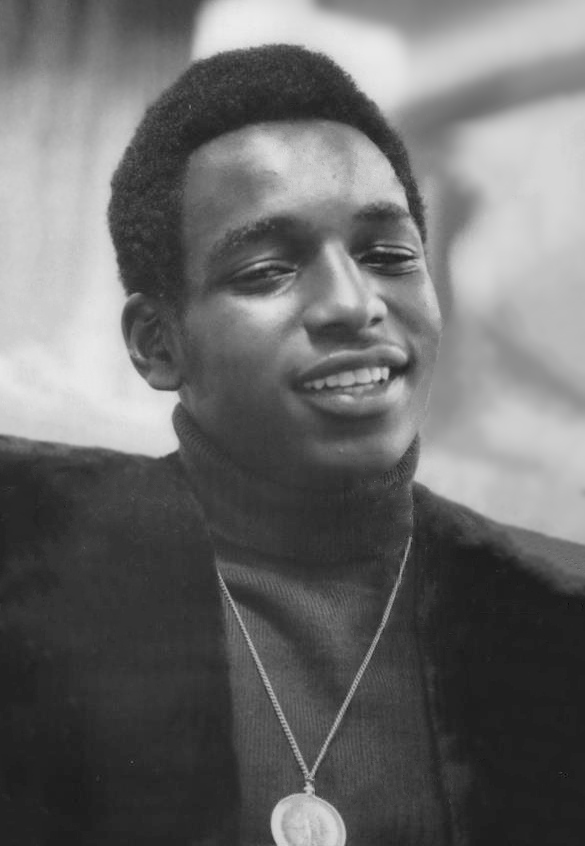
Sugar Ray Seales, 1973

- Joe Aska (born 1972), former professional American football running back
- Raja Bell (born 1976), professional basketball player, Utah Jazz
- Cory Bishop (born ca. 1990), U.S. Virgin Islands soccer player
- Livingstone Bramble (born 1960), boxer, born in Montserrat, raised on St. Croix
- Horace Clarke (1939–2020), professional baseball player, New York Yankees and San Diego Padres
- Quentin Coryatt (born 1970), professional NFL American football player, Indianapolis Colts
- Midre Cummings (born 1971), Major League Baseball player
- Tim Duncan (born 1976), former professional NBA basketball player
- Walt Frazier (born 1945), former professional NBA basketball player
- Muhammad Halim (born 1986), Olympic triple jumper
- Peter Jackson (1861–1901), 19th-century Australian boxing champion
- Linval Joseph (born 1988), professional NFL American football player, Minnesota Vikings
- Hanik Milligan (born 1979), former professional American football player
- Elmo Plaskett (1938–1998), baseball player
- Sugar Ray Seales (born 1952), boxer, gold medallist at the 1972 Summer Olympics
- Andre Wadsworth (born 1974), professional NFL American football player, Arizona Cardinals

=== Other ===
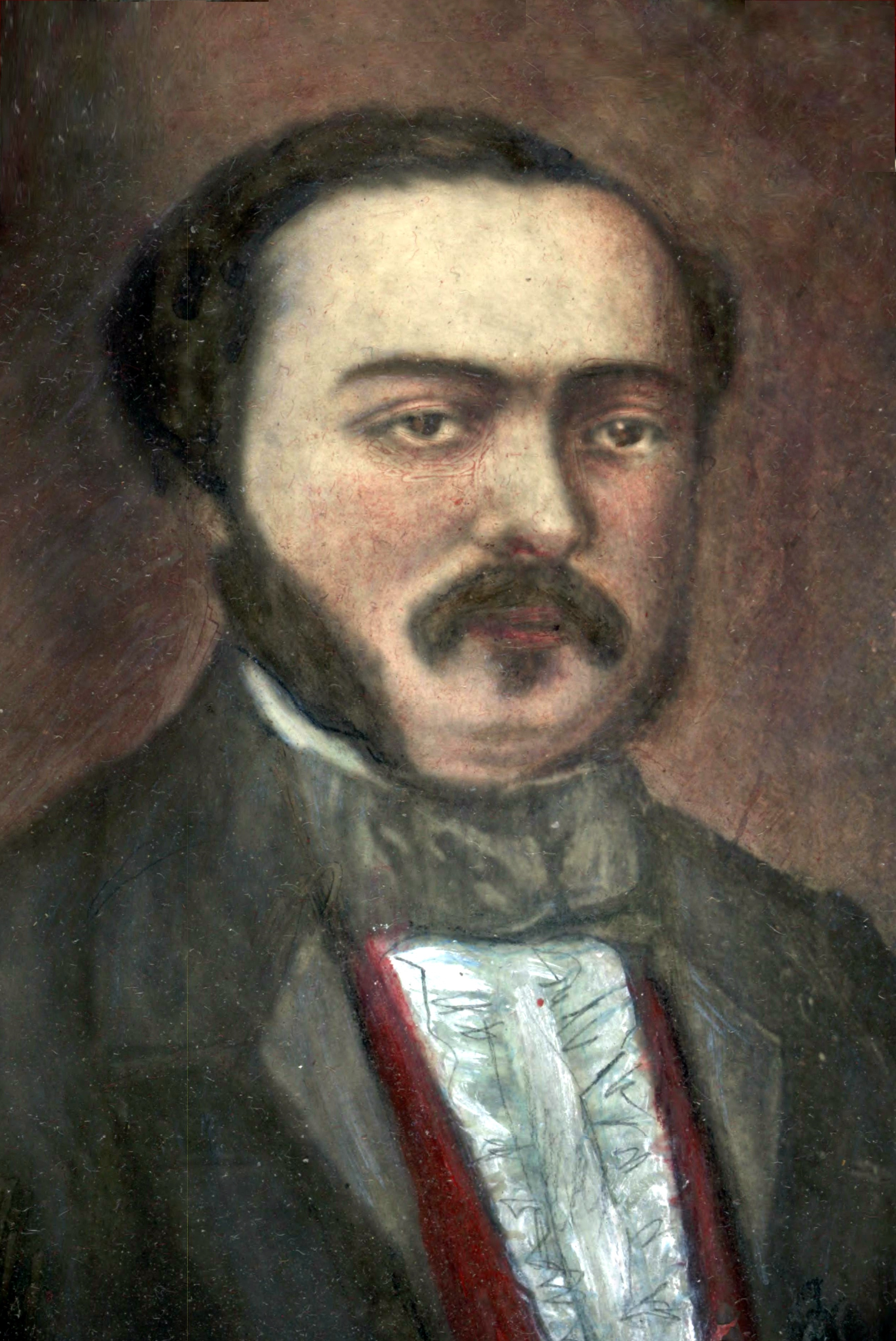
William Leidesdorff, 1845

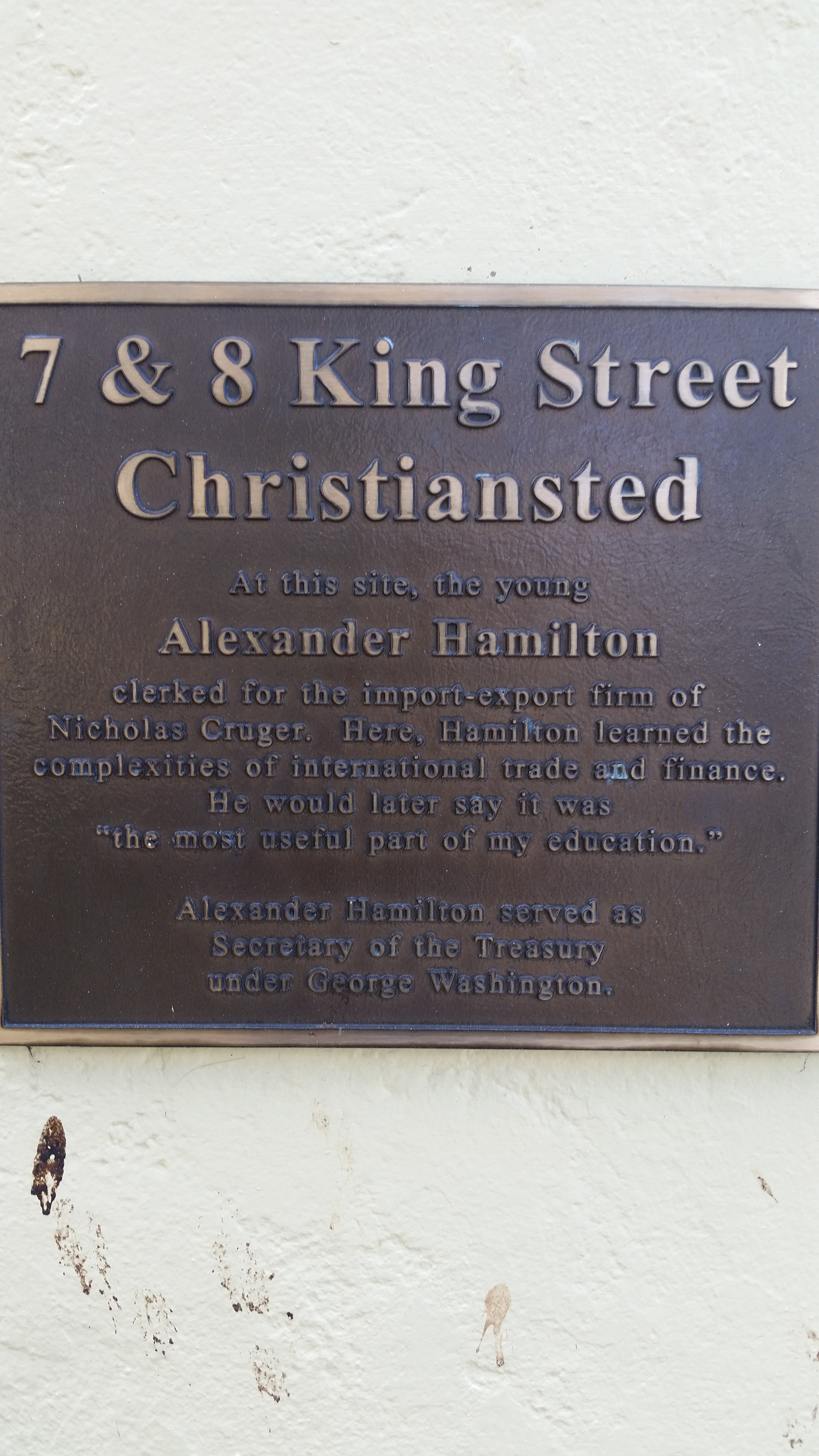
Historical marker commemorating Alexander Hamilton

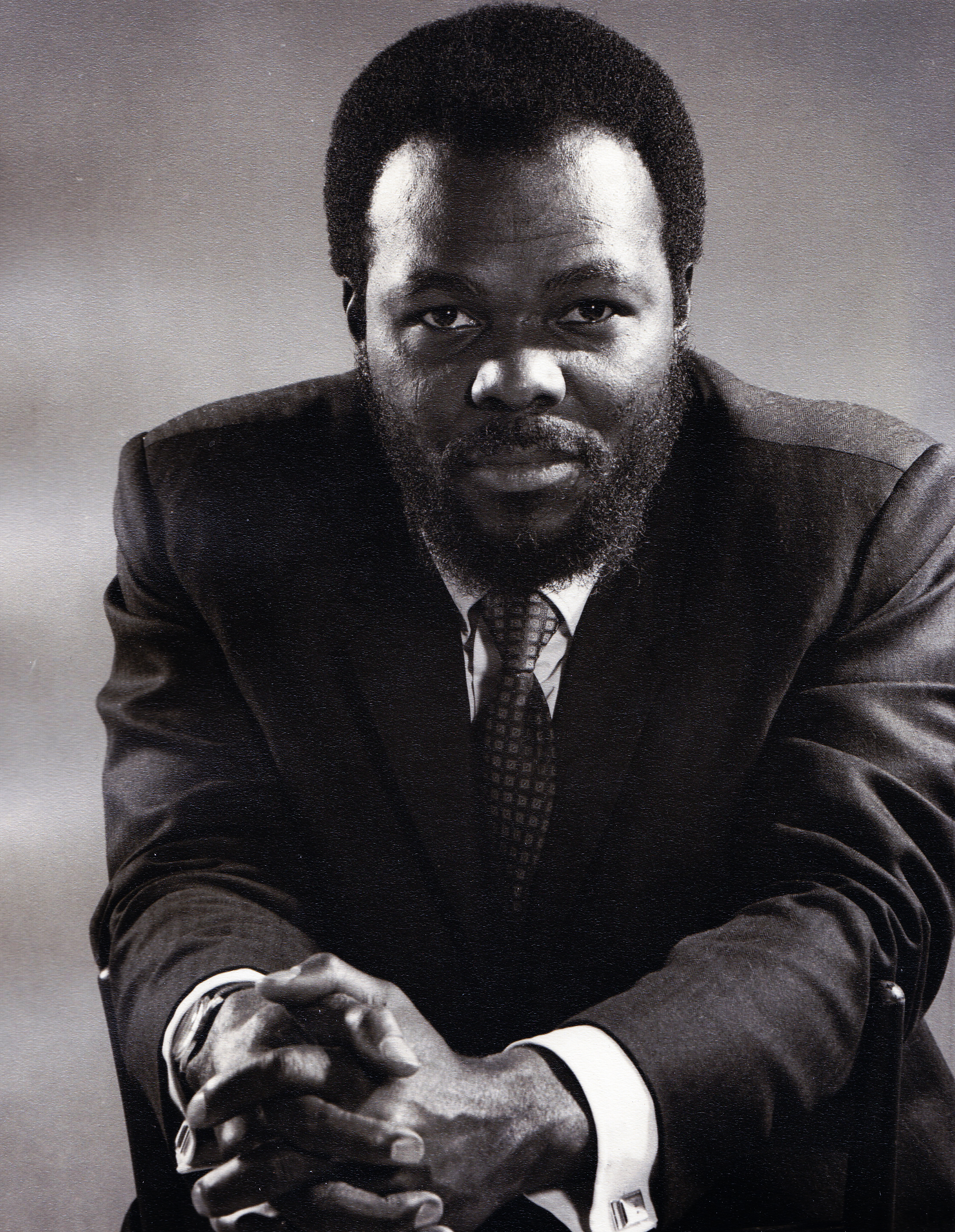
Roy Innis, ca.1970

- Margaret Hartman Markoe Bache (1770–1836), American printer and editor
- Judah P. Benjamin (1811–1884), American and Confederate politician
- Edmund Bourke (1761–1821), Danish diplomat
- Annie de Chabert (1908–1976), political figure, entrepreneur
- Frank Crosswaith (1892–1965), socialist politician and trade union organizer in New York City
- Francis J. D'Eramo (born 1959), judge at the United States Virgin Islands Superior Court of St. Croix
- Alexander Hamilton (1755/7-1804), American Founding Father, lived on St. Croix from the age of 10 or 11 to 17
- Hubert Harrison (1883–1927), Harlem activist and intellectual, known as the "father of Harlem Radicalism"
- Elizabeth Hawes (1903–1971), clothing designer, author and social critic, who wrote about her life in St. Croix titled But Say It Politely
- Arnold R. Highfield (1940–2019), historian
- Casper Holstein (1876–1944), New York mobster during the Harlem Renaissance
- D. Hamilton Jackson (1884–1946), labour rights advocate and he lobbied leaders in Denmark
- Roy Innis (1934–2017), civil rights advocate, chairman, Congress of Racial Equality (CORE)
- Hans Jonatan (1784–1827), possibly the first person of color to live in Iceland
- William Leidesdorff (1810–1848), entrepreneur, one of the founders of San Francisco
- Abraham Markoe (1727–1806), businessman, landowner and planter; later an American revolutionary figure
- Prince Monolulu (1881–1965), real name Peter Carl Mackay, a horse-racing tipster
- Warren Mosler (born 1949), American hedge fund manager, entrepreneur and economist; moved to St Croix in 2010
- Stacey Plaskett (born 1966), U.S. delegate
- Jasmin St. Claire (born 1972), American former pornographic actress and wrestler
- Hannibal Ware (born ca.1970), Inspector General of the U.S. Small Business Administration
- Erika J. Waters (born ca.1950), academic and critic; moved to St Croix in early 1970's

== See also ==
- 1878 St. Croix Labor Riots
- Culture of the Virgin Islands
- Music of the Virgin Islands
- St. George Village Botanical Garden
- Virgin Islands patch reefs
- WSVI, ABC TV station
- WTJX-TV, Virgin Island Public Television
