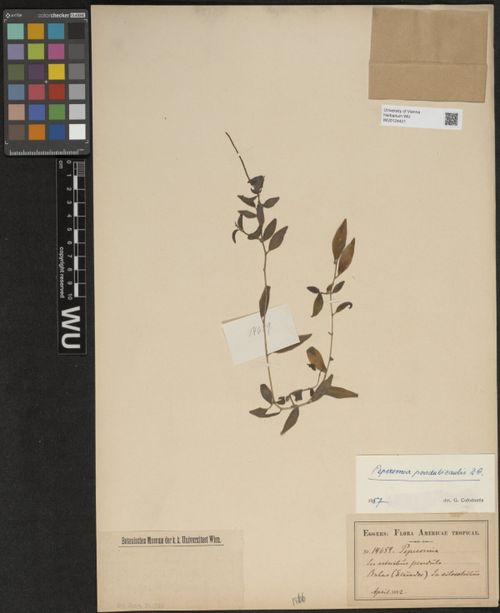

Scientific classification
- Kingdom: Plantae
- Clade: Tracheophytes
- Clade: Angiosperms
- Clade: Magnoliids
- Order: Piperales
- Family: Piperaceae
- Genus: Peperomia
- Species: P. pendulicaulis

Binomial name
- Peperomia pendulicaulis C. DC.

= Peperomia pendulicaulis =

Species of flowering plant

Peperomia pendulicaulis is a species of epiphyte in the genus Peperomia that is native to Ecuador. It grows on wet tropical biomes. Its conservation status is Threatened.

== Description ==
The type specimen were collected at Balao, Ecuador.

Peperomia pendulicaulis is a herb hanging from trees, with a stem about 30 cm (12 in) long, branched, up to 1.5 mm thick. The branchlets are rather densely hirtellous on the side opposite the leaves and glabrous beneath the leaves. The leaves are alternate with moderate petioles 1.5 mm long, hirtellous on the margin; the blade is elliptic-lanceolate, acute at both base and apex, membranaceous when dry, brownish-punctulate, up to 18 mm long and 6 mm wide, 3-nerved, glabrous on both sides. The peduncles are terminal, glabrous, 6 mm long, exceeding the petioles. The spikes are glabrous, flowering spikes nearly twice as long as the leaf blade, about 23 mm long and barely 1 mm thick, filiform and densely flowered; flowers arranged in rings. The bract has a round pelt, pedicellate at the center, slightly less than 0.5 mm in diameter. The anthers are elliptic. The ovary is emergent, obovate, somewhat roughened with glands, bearing a stigma just below the obtuse apex; the stigma is minute, globose, and glabrous.

== Taxonomy and naming ==
It was described in 1920 by Casimir de Candolle in the Annuaire du Conservatoire et du Jardin botaniques de Genève, from specimens collected by Henrik Franz Alexander von Eggers. The epithet pendulicaulis refers to the pendulous stem.

== Distribution and habitat ==
It is native to Ecuador. It grows as a epiphyte and is a herb. It grows on wet tropical biomes.

== Conservation ==
This species is assessed as Threatened, in a preliminary report.
