= List of botanical gardens and arboretums in U.S. Virgin Islands =

This list of botanical gardens and arboretums in U.S. Virgin Islands is intended to include all significant botanical gardens and arboretums in the U.S. Virgin Islands

Name	Image	Affiliation	City
Magens Bay Arboretum			Magens Bay
St. George Village Botanical Garden			Frederiksted

== See also ==
- List of botanical gardens and arboretums in the United States
