= Frederiksted Historic District =

- U.S. National Register of Historic Places
- U.S. Historic district
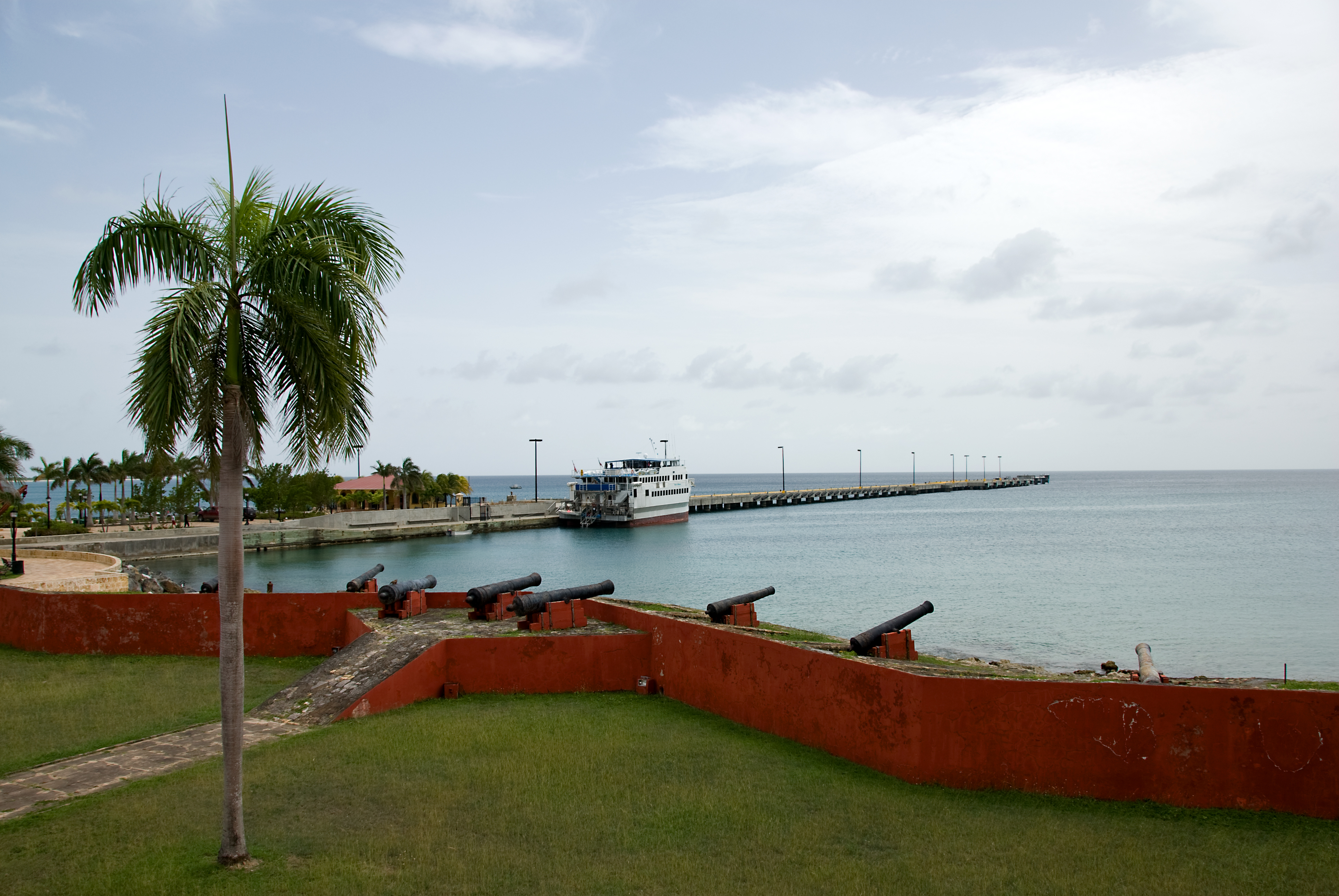
- The Rorqual, 2009

- Location within Saint Croix, U.S. Virgin Islands Location within the U.S. Virgin Islands
- Location: Roughly bounded by Fisher St., the cemetery, Fort Frederick, Frederiksted, United States Virgin Islands
- Coordinates: 17°42′53″N 64°53′29″W
- Built: 1752
- Architect: Multiple
- Architectural style: Late Victorian, Georgian, Gothic Revival
- NRHP reference No.: 76001853
- Added to NRHP: August 9, 1976

Frederiksted Historic District is a historic district located on the island of Saint Croix in the United States Virgin Islands. It was listed on the U.S. National Register of Historic Places in 1976.

Frederiksted Historic District includes the original town laid out in a gridiron plan in 1751. Fort Frederik, which now houses a museum, was the original focal point of the town plan. The original buildings were destroyed in a fire in 1758. In 1878, plantation workers set fire to much of the town during the Fireburn insurrection. The fire damaged areas were rebuilt, with many of the buildings reflecting Georgian and Late Victorian architectural detailing. Significant buildings in the district include the Fort Frederik and the Customs House.

== See also ==
- National Register of Historic Places listings in the United States Virgin Islands
