= U.S. Virgin Islands Dry Forest =

Sub-tropical dry forest spanning the United States Virgin Islands

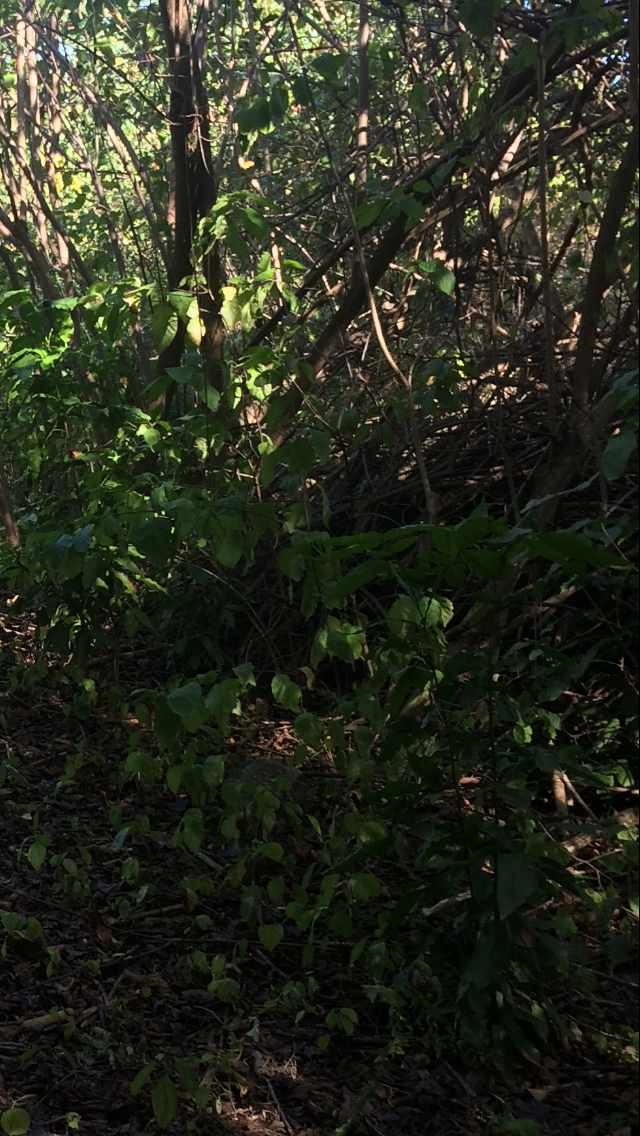
- Dry Forest located in Barren Spot, Saint Croix U.S. Virgin Islands

Ecology
- Realm: Neotropic

Geography
- Country: United States
- Territory: U.S. Virgin Islands

The U.S. Virgin Islands dry forest is a sub-tropical dry forest spanning the United States Virgin Islands with varying degrees of coverage on each island. A dry forest is a habitat type defined by the World Wide Fund for Nature as being a predominantly deciduous forest located in a climate that is warm year-round. A dry forest may receive several hundred centimeters of rain per year, and have long dry seasons which last several months. Dry forests can receive 850-1100mm of precipitation per year. In the case of the U.S. Virgin islands forest, high quantities of sea salt from the ocean decrease the growth height of the trees. This creates two canopy layers that are commonly found at an elevation below 300 meters. Additionally, the unique wind pattern that the islands create may have added to this effect.

Within the three islands that make up the United States Virgin Islands, St. John has maintained a high percentage of dry forest cover, compared to St. Thomas (43.1%) and St. Croix (9.22%). The topography of St. John and St. Thomas include steep hills and slopes compared to St. Croix. St. John is the most protected of the three islands, and as such it has the largest extensive tropical dry forests in the U.S. Virgin Islands. The island contains 650 native plants, 5,000 or more terrestrial insects, over 180 species of birds, of which 90% are native, and six native mammal bat species. The islands' rich diversity also provide a host of species interactions, such as St. Croix Anole lizards that prey on Caribbean termites. One of the most common trees in the “native dry forest garden” is the amarat, a thornless variety of acacia (casha bush).

== Zones and Characteristics ==
The Virgin Islands Dry Forest are divided into four zones: Semi-evergreen, Semi-deciduous, Drought-deciduous, and Gallery semi-deciduous forest. Precisely 70-75% of Semi-evergreen forest consists of transitional characteristics of moist and dry forest. These characteristics consist of trees that maintain an evergreen pigmentation annually. Semi-evergreen forest usually grows in the most moist area of the dry forest. This tends to be the edge of the dry forest at altitudes of 984 feet and decreasing. Semi-evergreen forest can be found on the steep slopes of St. John at Maho Bay, Crown Mountain St. John and Mount Eagle St. Croix. The Semi-evergreen forest also contains epiphytic plants, commonly referred as air-plants. These air-plants are found in the midcenter of the forest in Estate Grove on St. Croix.

Semi-deciduous forest consists of 25% of evergreen trees and 75% of trees that tend to abandon their leaves during cooler months. Semi-Deciduous forest covers the majority of land on all three islands. This is zone usually forms on northern hill regions of each island. Semi-deciduous forest can easily be found mid-island and in Estate Northside on St. Croix. This division of forest can also be found Southern Magens Bay, Leinster Bay on St. John and Southern Spray Bay on Water Island. Researchers speculate Semi-deciduous forest were once not as dry: it is possible a community of plants that thrived in moist soil were present more than a decade before observations were recorded. The morphology of trees in this forest division are quite distinct. In addition, this forest is separated in subdivisions classified as upper layer and bottom layer. The upper layer consists of small trees ranging from 8–11 meters and large trees 15–20 meters high. The bottom layer is filled with a variety of saplings that grows from the leaf undercover. A few plants commonly found in this area are tan-tan (Leucaena leucocephala) and guinea grass (Megathyrsus maximus).

Drought deciduous forest and Gallery semi-deciduous forest have high quantities of deciduous trees (75%), unlike semi-evergreen forest and semi-deciduous forest. However, the distinct difference between Drought-deciduous and Gallery semi-deciduous forest is where they develop. Drought deciduous forests form on slopes, while Gallery semi-deciduous forests grow in guts that lack moisture. Gallery semi-deciduous forests are only found in guts in St. John, St. Thomas and St. Croix. The forest is found in an upper land area in St. John, Peterborg hillside in St. Thomas and Mahogany Gut/Caledonia in St. Croix. Some tree species grow taller in Gallery semi-deciduous forest vs. semi-deciduous forest due to the saturation of moisture from the rain in the guts.

Drought deciduous forest are not as common as semi-evergreen and semi-deciduous. Less than 1% of this forest inhabits St. Croix and Water Island. St. John has the greatest abundance of Drought deciduous forest: located in eastern hillside regions. Drought Deciduous forest is also found on St. Thomas, near Peterborg.

Researchers typically identify Drought deciduous forest in elevations lower than 250 meters, yet not limited to southern arid slopes. This zone also consists of upper and lower layers: upper layers consist of the canopy ranging from 7–10 meters, with a minimum of tall trees up to 15 meters tall. Lower layers consist of shrub species that dry out rapidly compared to tall tree species. A species commonly found in this forest is turpentine (Syncarpia glomulifera).

== Rare Plants ==
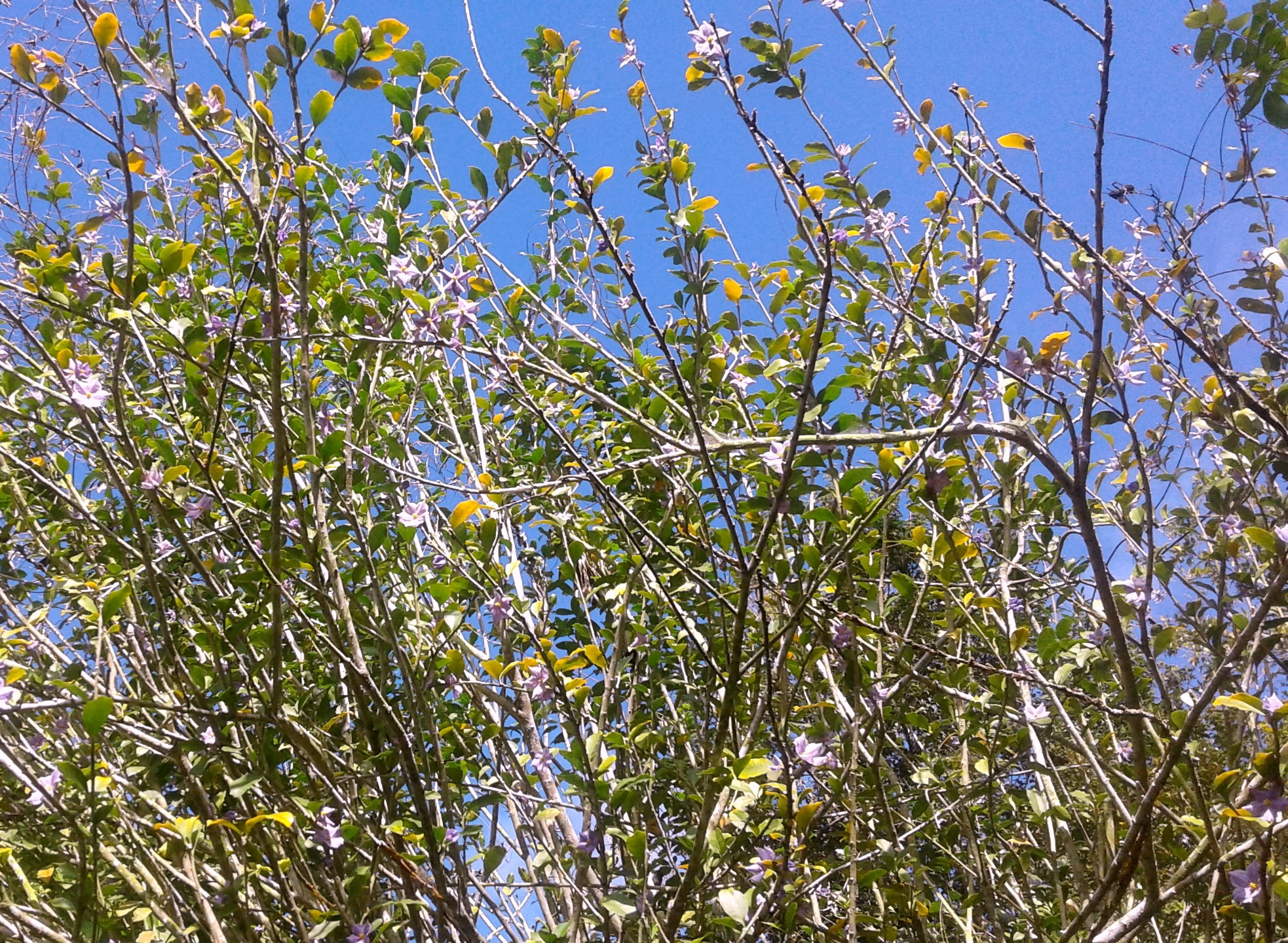
Solanum conocarpum in bloom, April 2017

Solanum conocarpum (Marron bacora) is considered a rare plant that was discovered in the evergreen forest in St. John. Dispersal biology and organisms that consume the plant are uncertain. In the late 1990s, five individuals were sighted and recorded in the mid-elevation forests of St. John. Subsequently, in February 2003, over 150 additional individuals were found by David Hamada on the island of St. John. As part of its conservation effort, the plant has since been planted at various other locations, including St. George's Village Botanical Gardens on St. Croix, the University of the Virgin Islands' St. Thomas campus and Fairchild Botanical Gardens in Miami. Researchers have established the lack of seedlings is correlated to the lack of saplings. The seeds derived from a fruit also have fragile seed coating, potentially worsening chances of survival in the wild. With the lack of individuals in the wild, cross fertilization is challenging.

== Disturbances ==
The most common disturbances of Semi-evergreen forests are development of roads and infrastructure. Creating new dirt and paved roads cause soil erosion that leads to depleted soil nutrients. This leads to decreased plant and animal diversity. A dramatic example is the development of roads on Crown Mountain, St. Thomas. This led to local extinction of plants, fungi and animals diversity. The lack of tree cover can also lead to an increase of arid regions.

Semi-Deciduous forest has also faced human disturbance. The land is manipulated for agriculture use frequently.

In 2004, 315 terrestrial species in the Virgin Islands were on the International Union for Conservation of Nature Red List (IUCN Red List) of Threatened Species. The islands serve as a wintering ground for birds such as the Cape May Warbler (Dendroica tigrine), Black-throated Blue Warbler (D. caerulescens), and Prairie Warbler (D. discolor). Intact forests are necessary for the perpetuation of these Warbler species.
