= Fort Frederik =

- U.S. National Register of Historic Places
- U.S. National Historic Landmark
- U.S. Historic district – Contributing property
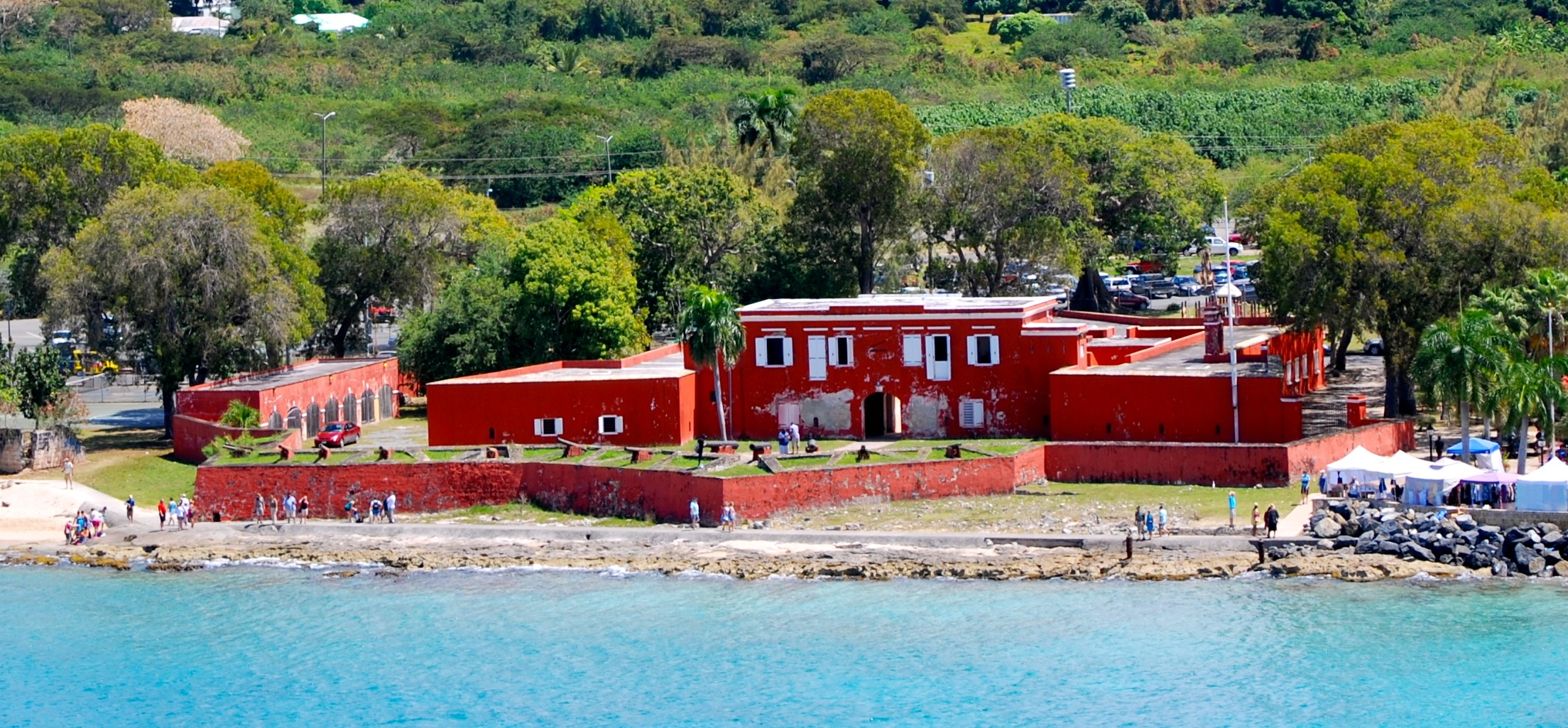
- Fort Frederik

- Location within Saint Croix, U.S. Virgin Islands Location within the U.S. Virgin Islands
- Location: North of junction of Lagoon Road and King Street, Frederiksted, United States Virgin Islands
- Coordinates: 17°42′54.92″N 64°53′.43″W
- Area: 2 acres (8,100 m^{2})
- Built: 1752
- Architectural style: Colonial
- Part of: Frederiksted Historic District (ID76001853)
- NRHP reference No.: 96001073 (NRHP); 97001269 (NHL)

Significant dates
- Added to NRHP: October 8, 1996
- Designated NHL: September 25, 1997
- Designated CP: August 9, 1976

Fort Frederik, also known as Frederiksfort, is a U.S. National Historic Landmark in Frederiksted, United States Virgin Islands. It was built between 1752 and 1760 by Denmark-Norway to defend the economic interests of the natural deep water port of Frederiksted and to ward off pirates. It has red and white painted walls, making it quite different to the yellow and white of Fort Christiansværn on the other side of the island. It is located at the north end of Frederiksted, in St. Croix, south of the junction of Mahogany Road and VI 631. It should not be confused with Frederiks Fort, Fortberg Hill, on St. John, which is also listed on the National Register of Historic Places.

According to Westergaard, "It was soon found that a customs house was not sufficient, but that cannon must be provided, and placed as to command the roads where the ships lay anchored. In lack of such a 'water battery', ships were accustomed to slip away in the night-time without securing papers of paying their dues."

In 1776, the first salute from foreign soil to the new nation of the United States of America was fired from the fort. The salute of Old Glory which had been raised on an American brigantine at port in Frederiksted was a violation of the laws of Denmark-Norway's neutrality however the islands had helped the British colonist in America sealing a friendliness between the two colonies, and the salute was therefore appropriate.

It is from this fort that Danish Governor-General Peter von Scholten emancipated the slaves on 3 July 1848. John Gottliff (also known as Moses Gotlieb, General Bordeaux, or Buddhoe) had led 8,000 blacks in a freedom march to Frederiksted. At the time, there were 17,000 slaves and 5,000 free blacks on St. Croix.

The fort includes a museum and art gallery, it is open weekdays from 8:30am to 4pm, and Saturdays from 1pm to 4pm. Admission was $3 (2015), now $10 (2026).

Fort Frederik was listed as a contributing property in the Frederiksted Historic District in 1976. It was individually listed on the National Register of Historic Places in 1996. It was further declared a National Historic Landmark in 1997.

Fort Frederik now stands guard over the Eliza James-McBean Clock Tower and Emancipation Park, a town park right in front of the Frederiksted fort and waterfront. The park contains statues of historically important Virgin Islanders. Small paths weave through dozens of large mahogany trees and fragrant flowers. This Federiksted park honors the slave revolt leader General Buddhoe and also serves to recall and honor the 1848 proclamation by Governor Peter von Scholten that emancipated slaves in the Danish islands. The park has many benches and a small gazebo and is the location for Jazz in the Park, every 3rd Friday of the month (2014).

== Images ==
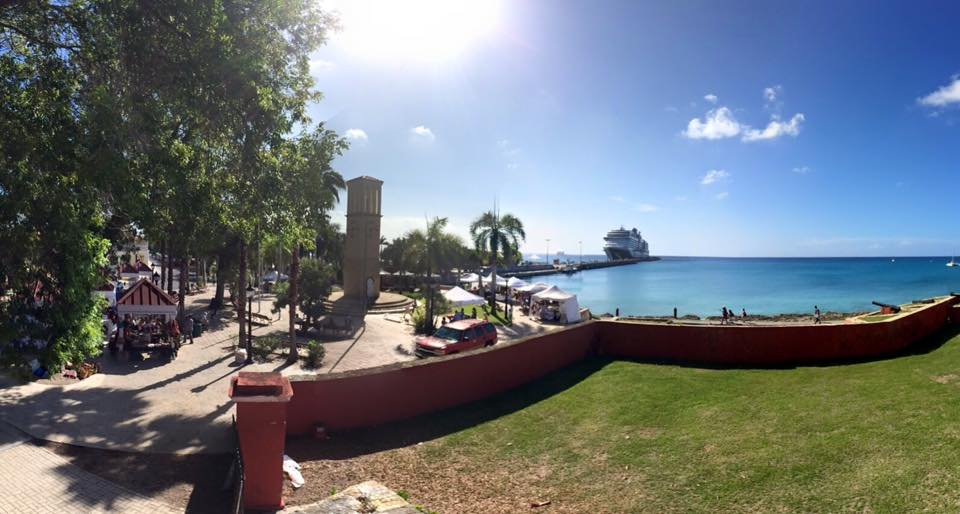
2nd Story facing SW

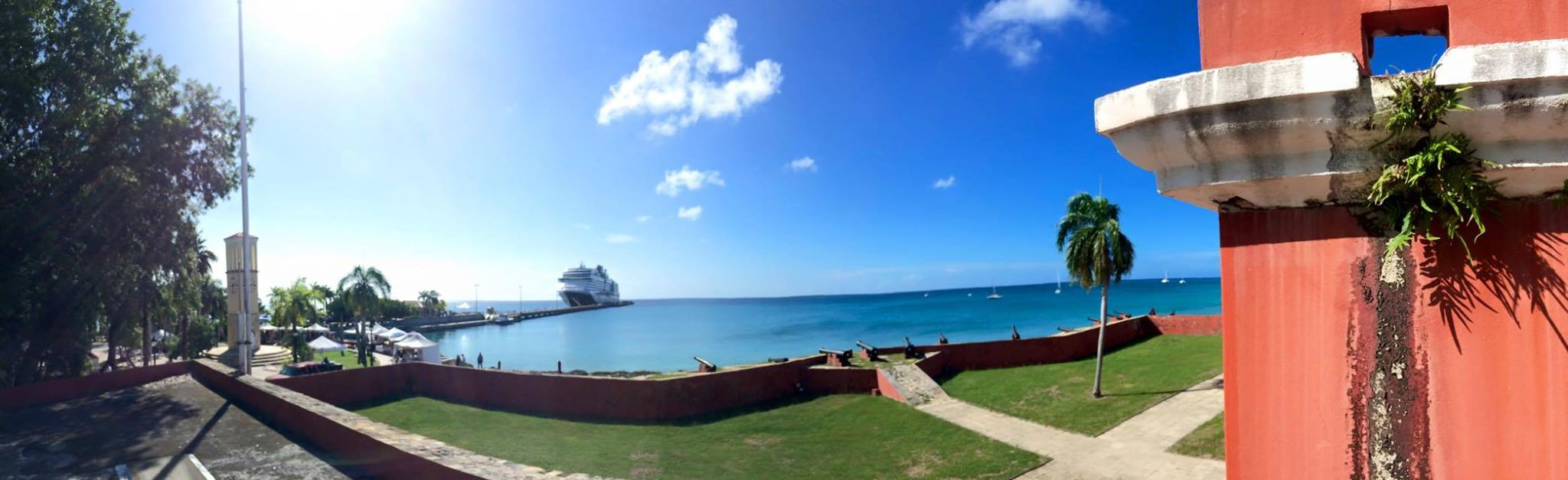
2nd Story facing West

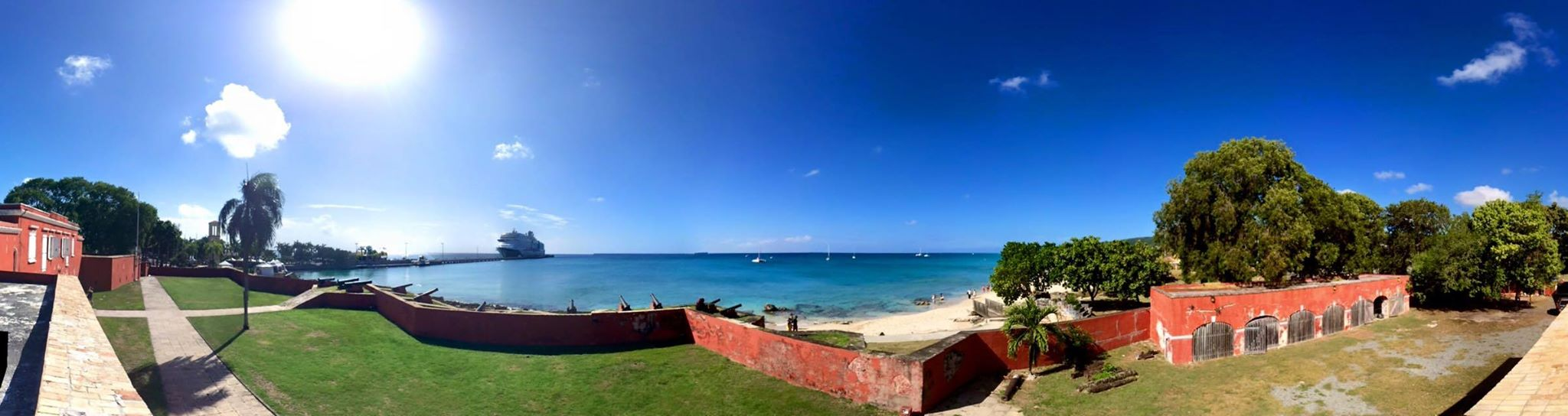
2nd Story Panoramic facing South to West to North

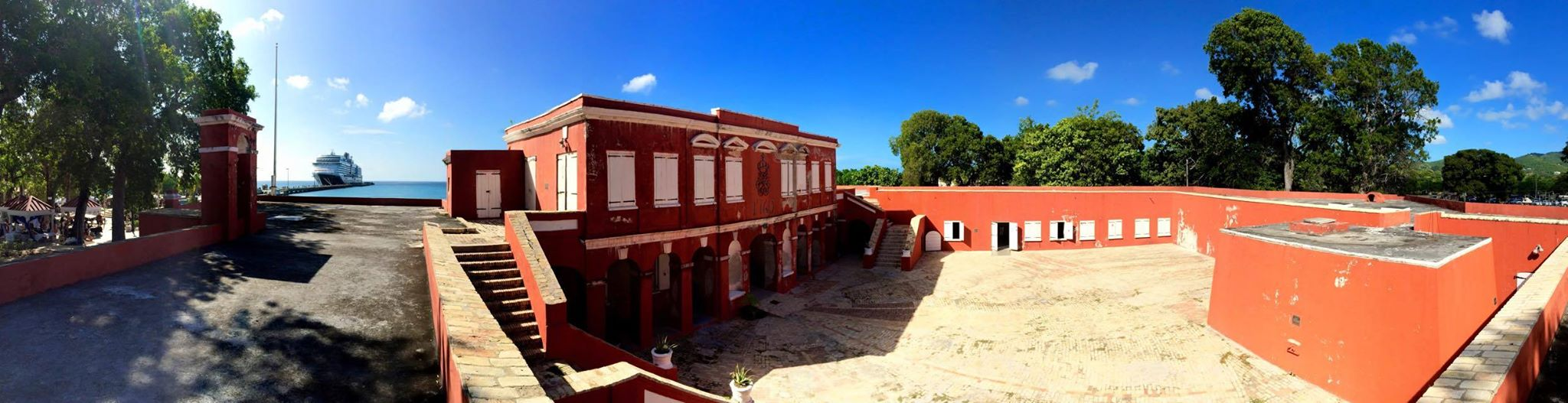
2nd Story Panoramic facing West to North to East

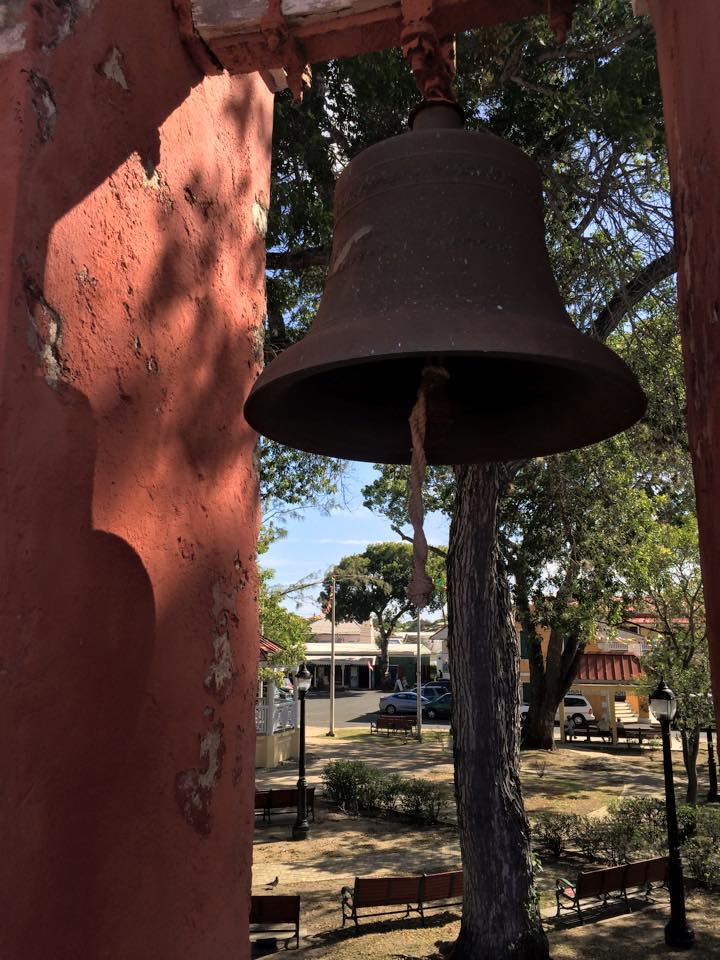
Bell with View of N2theBlue Scuba Diving in the Parking Area

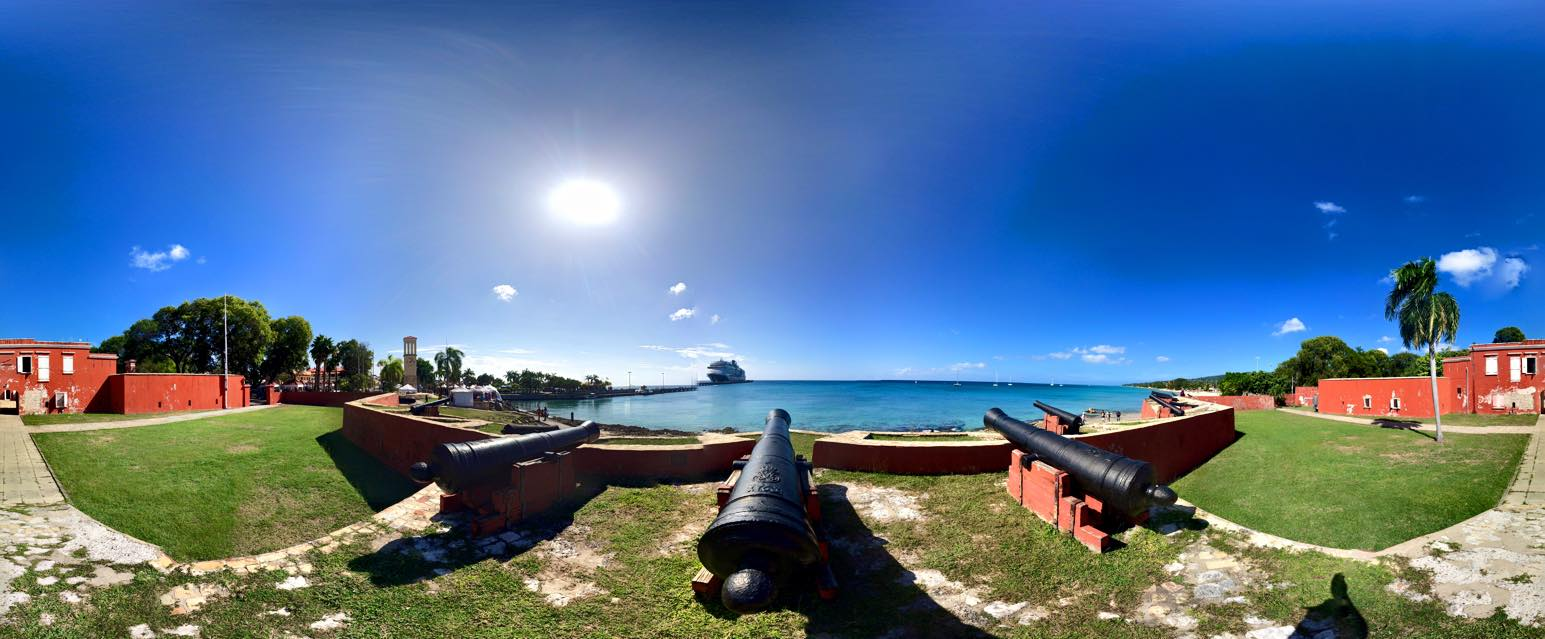
Cannon Battery Facing West

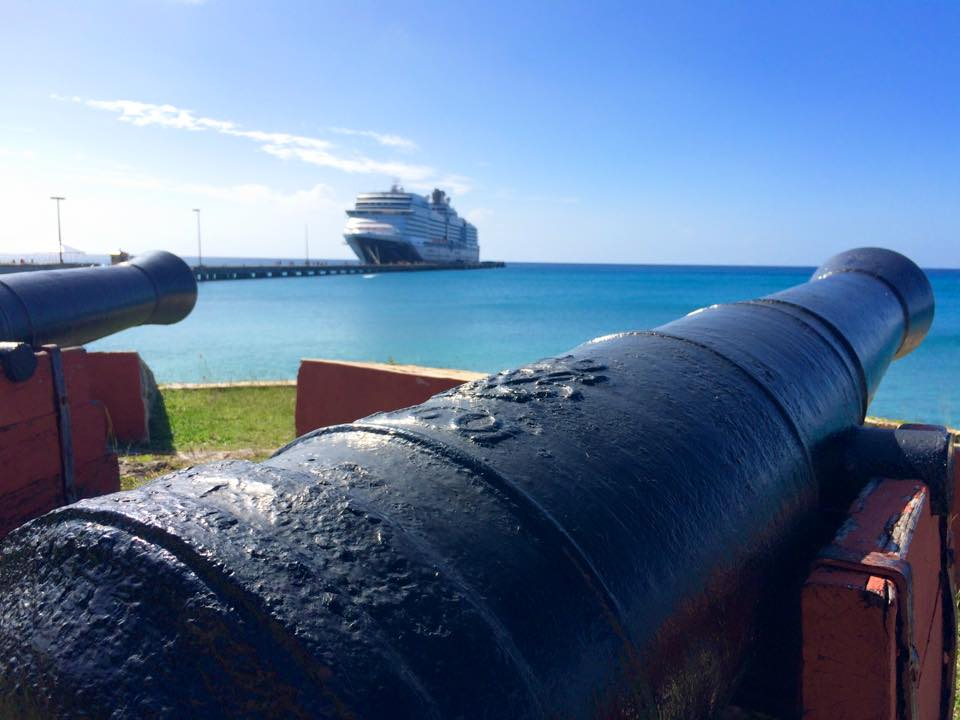
Cannon View Facing West

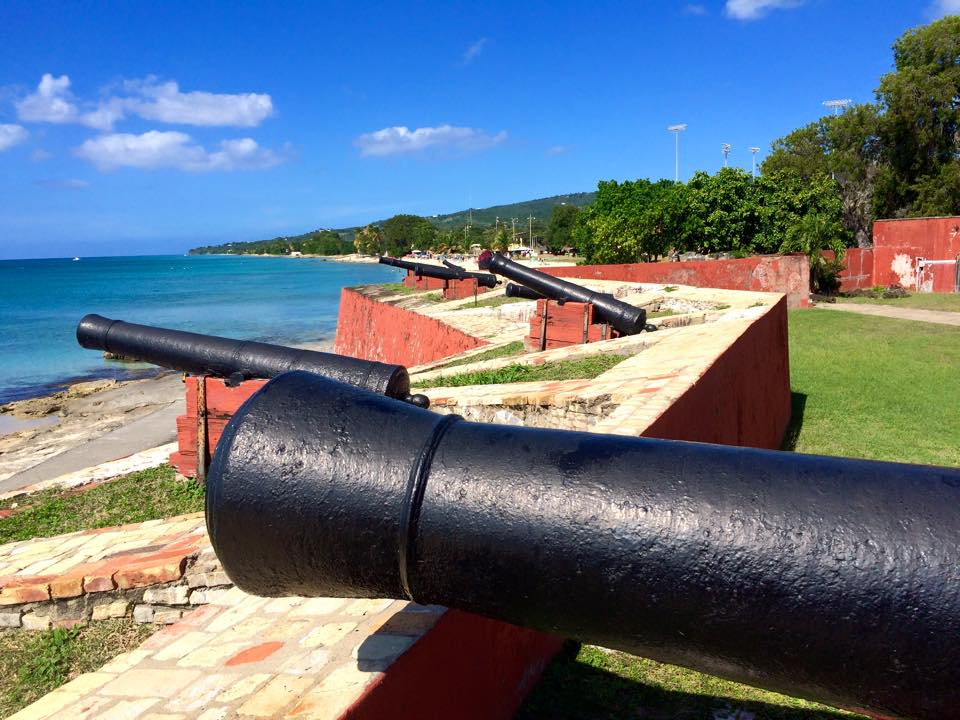
Cannons View

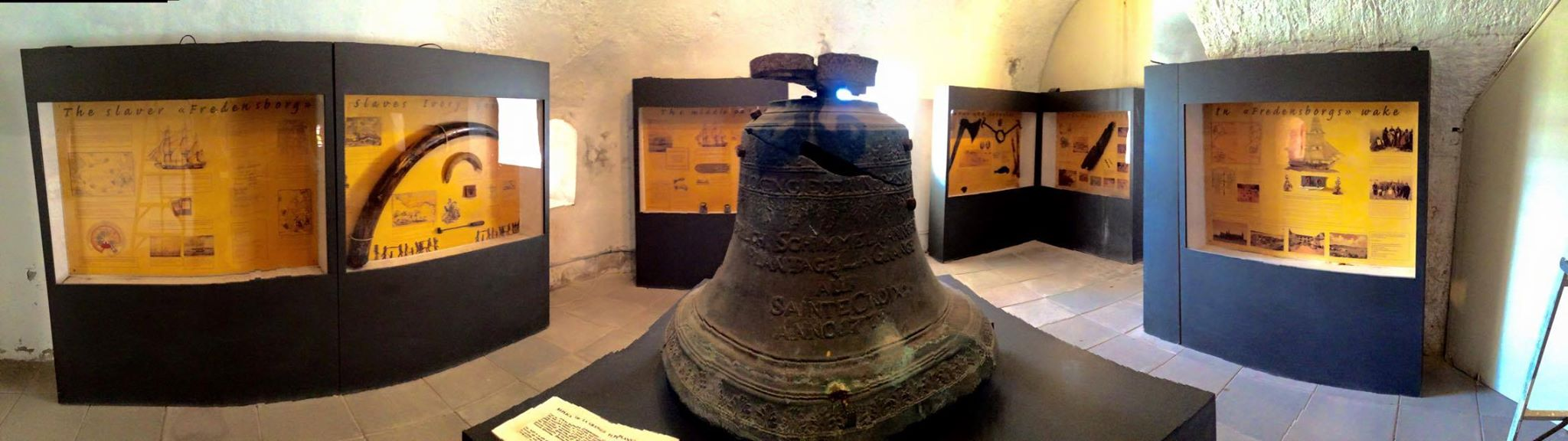
Freedom Display and Museum onsite

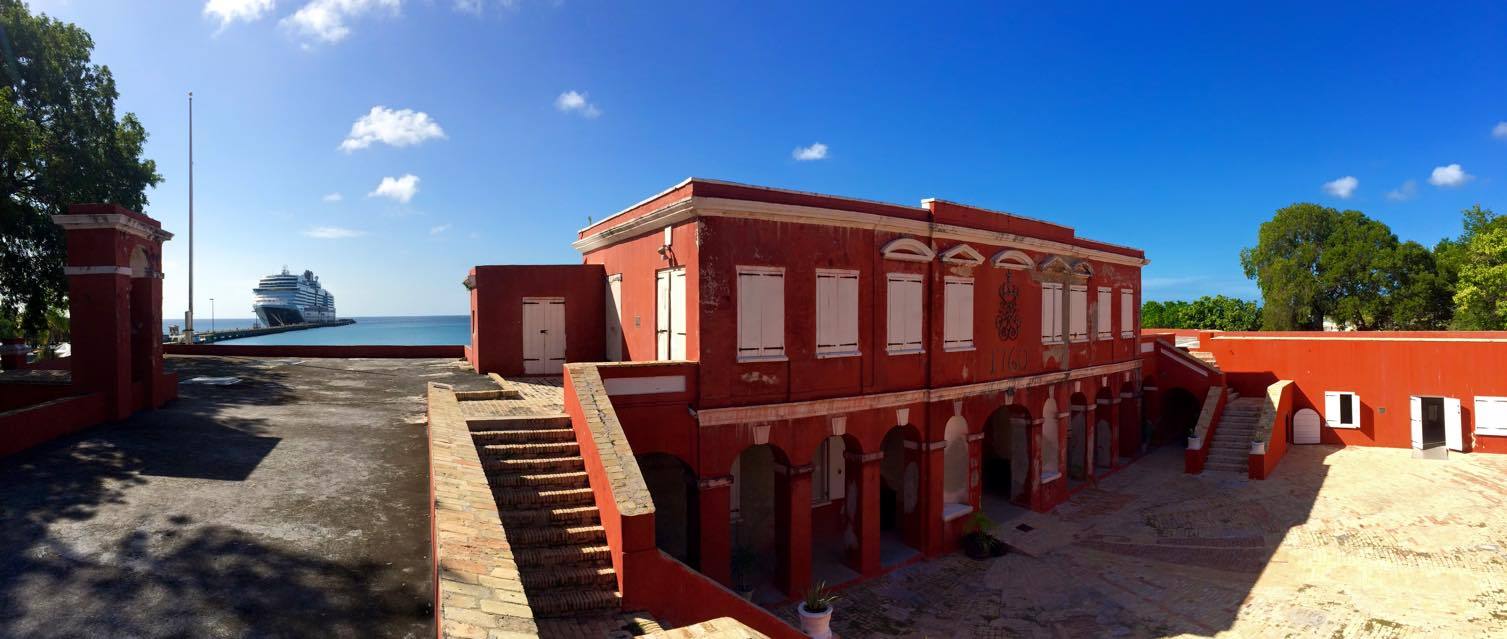
Internal Courtyard 2nd Story Panoramic

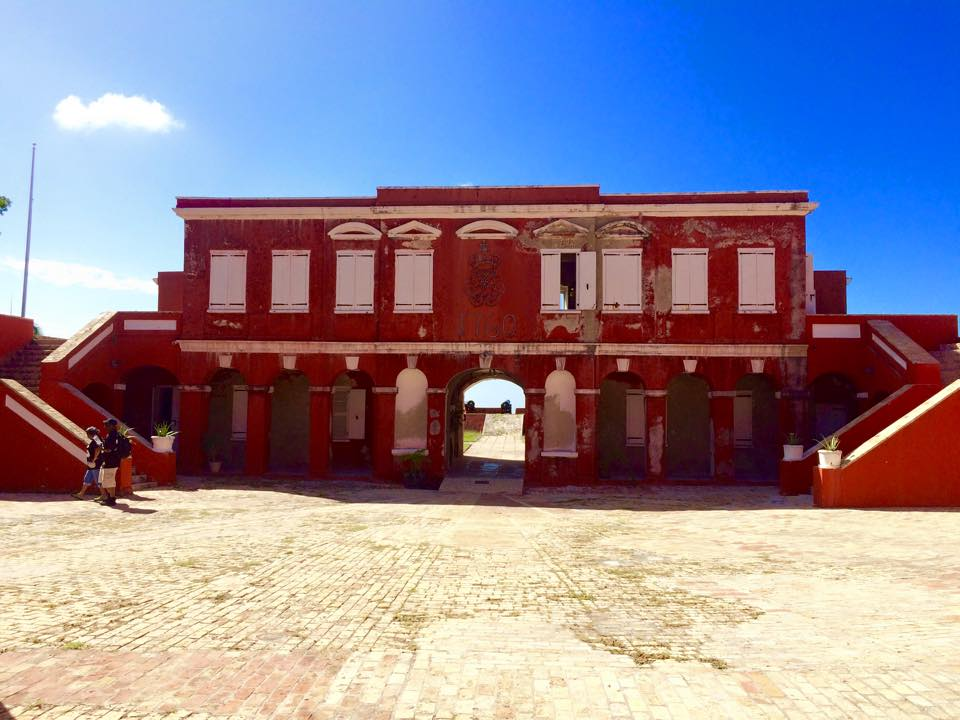
Internal Courtyard Commanders Quarters and the Portofino

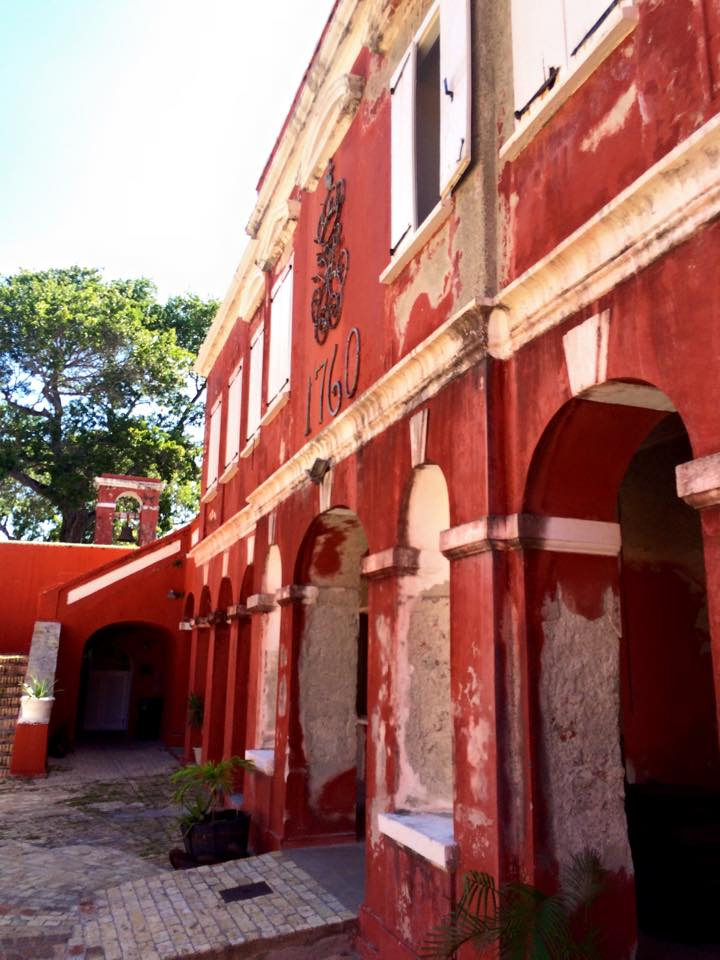
Internal Courtyard Commanders Quarters Facing South

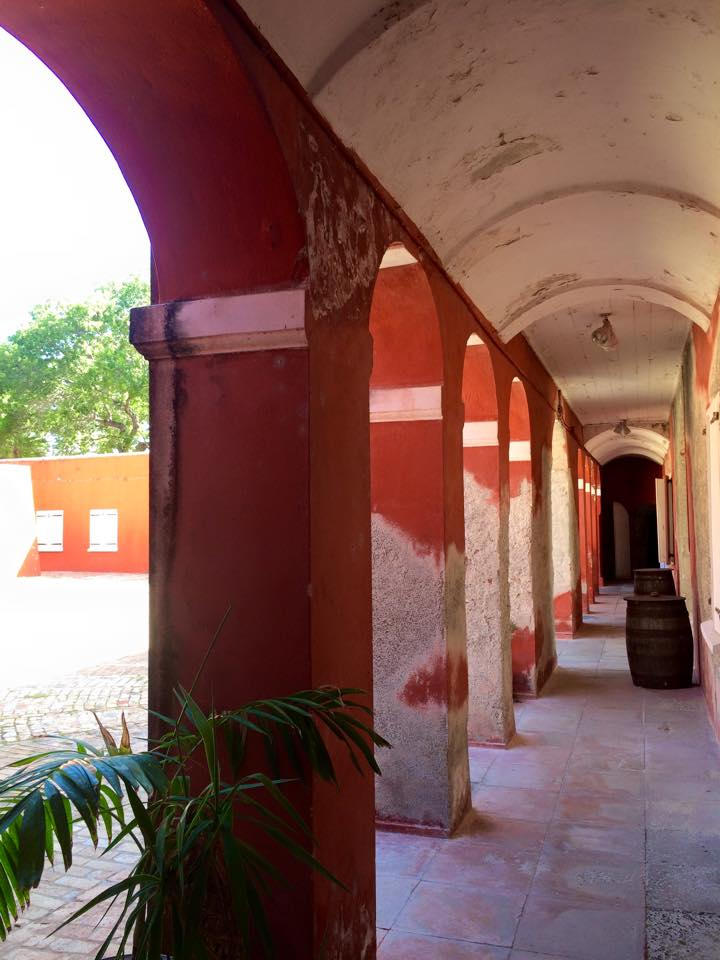
Internal Courtyard Facing South

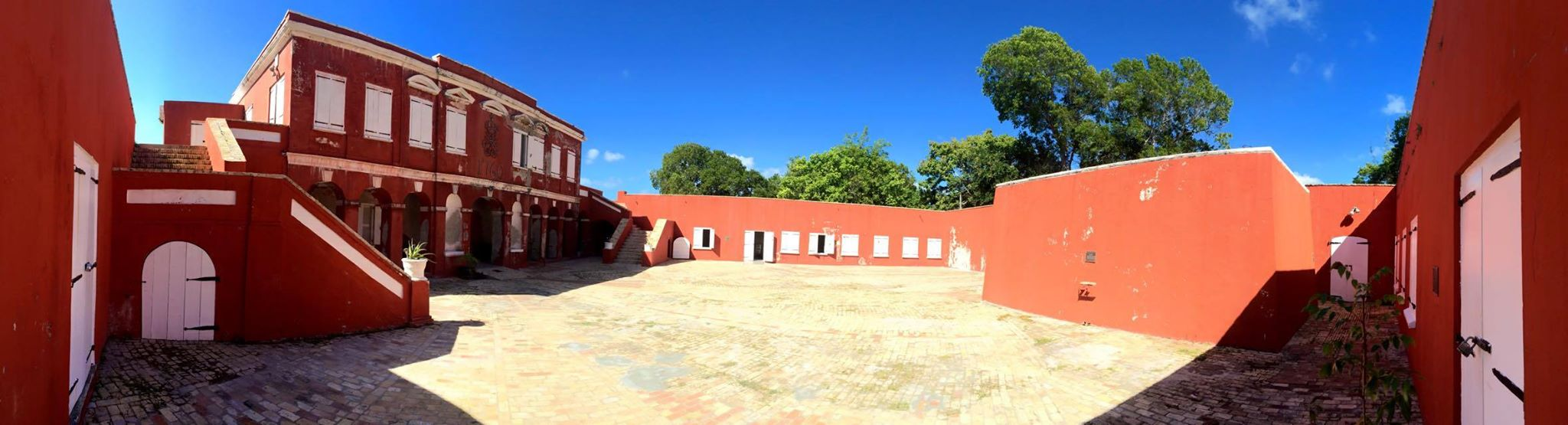
Internal Courtyard Facing West to North to East

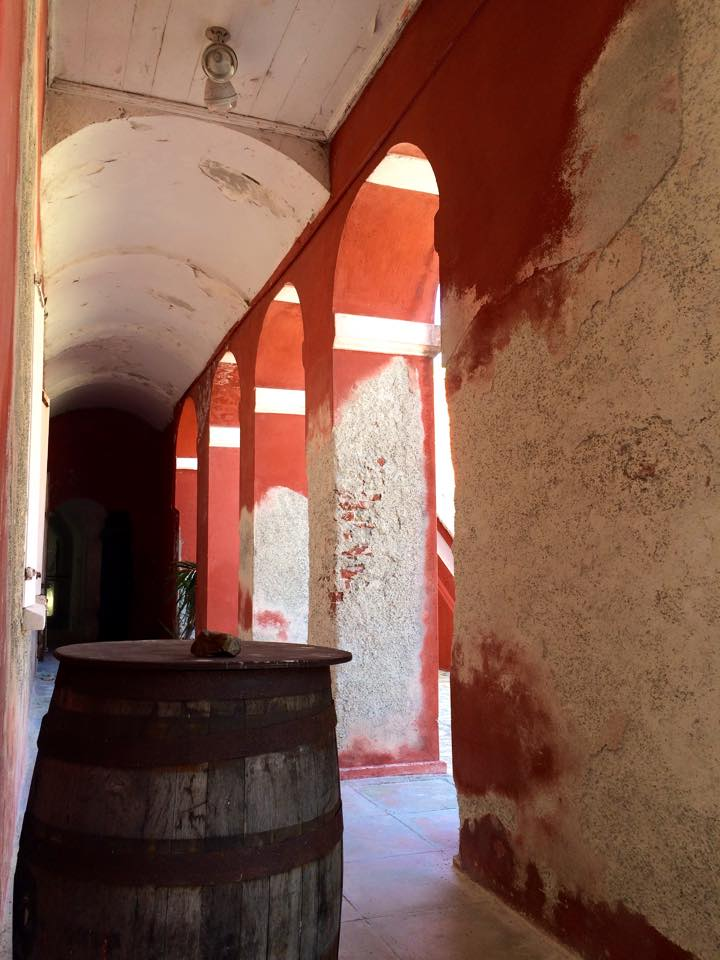
Internal Courtyard Portofino Facing North

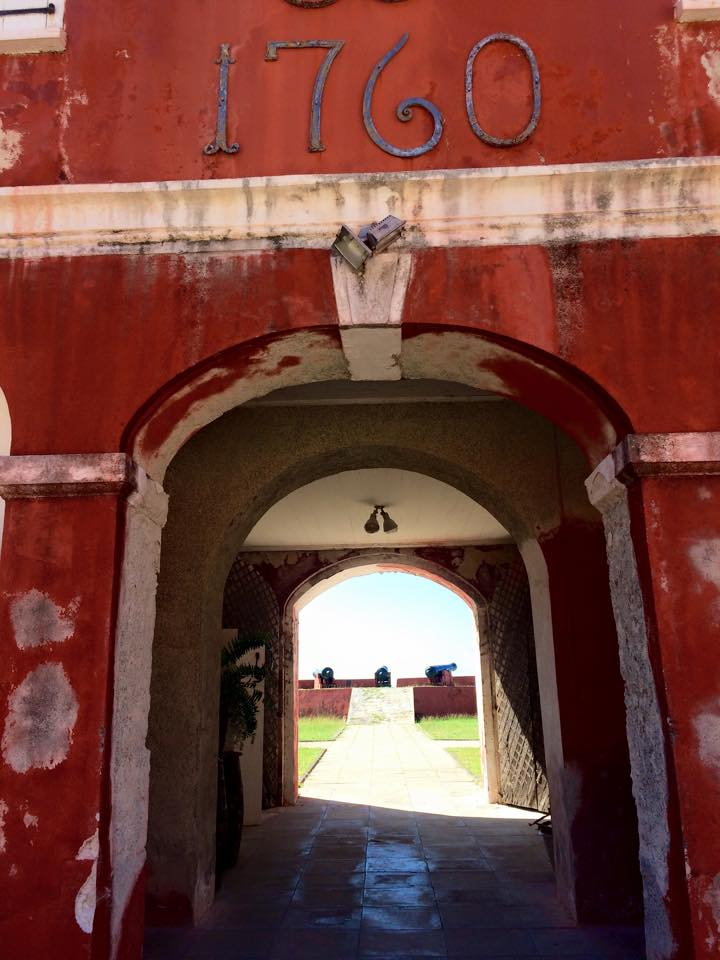
Internal Courtyard Portofino West

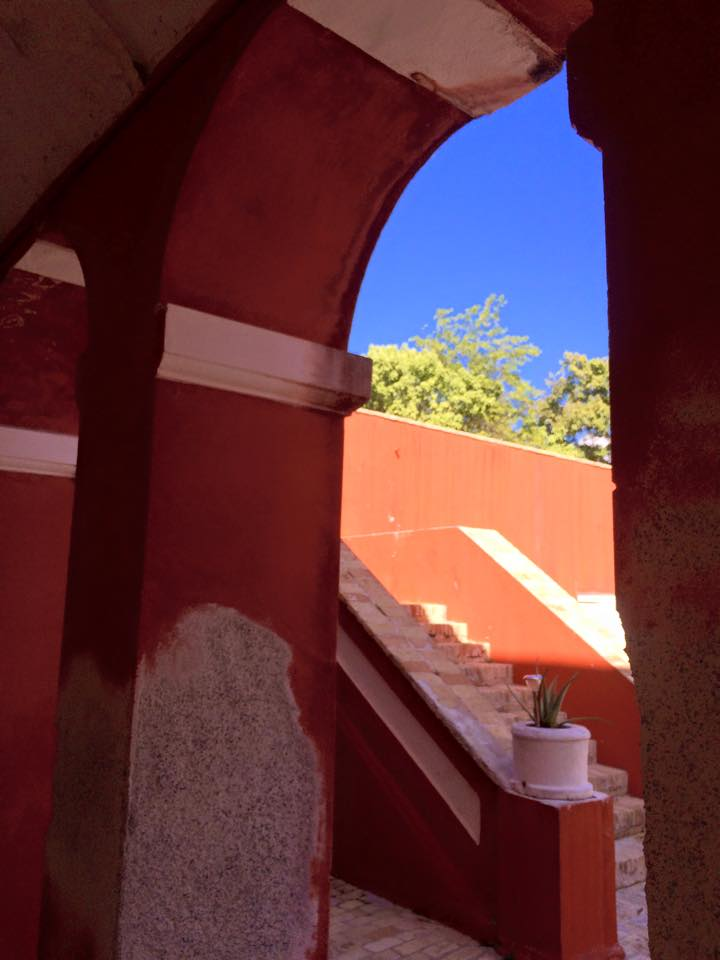
Internal Courtyard Facing NE

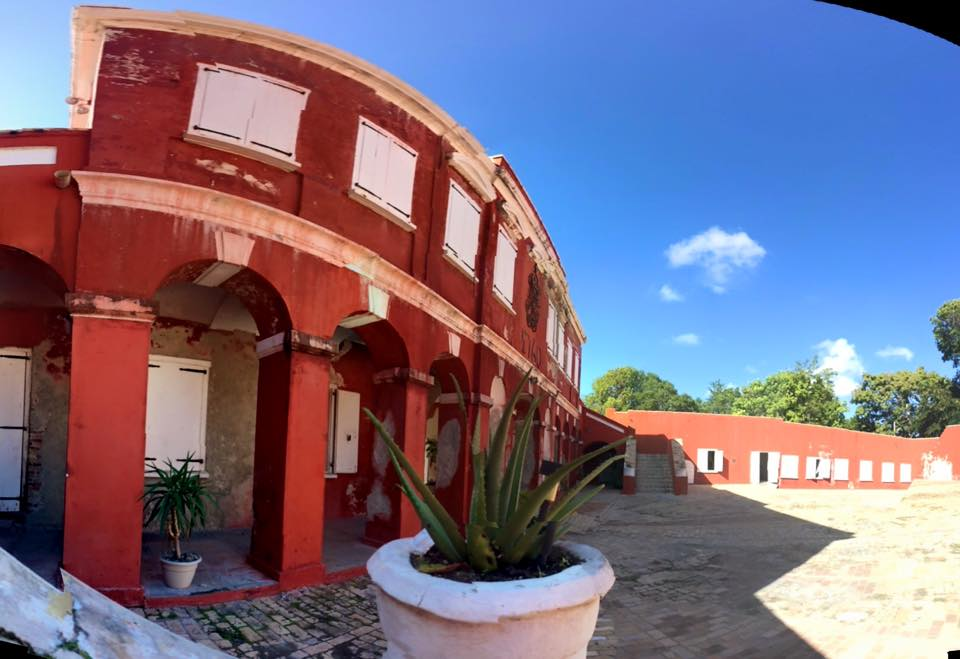
Internal Courtyard Facing North

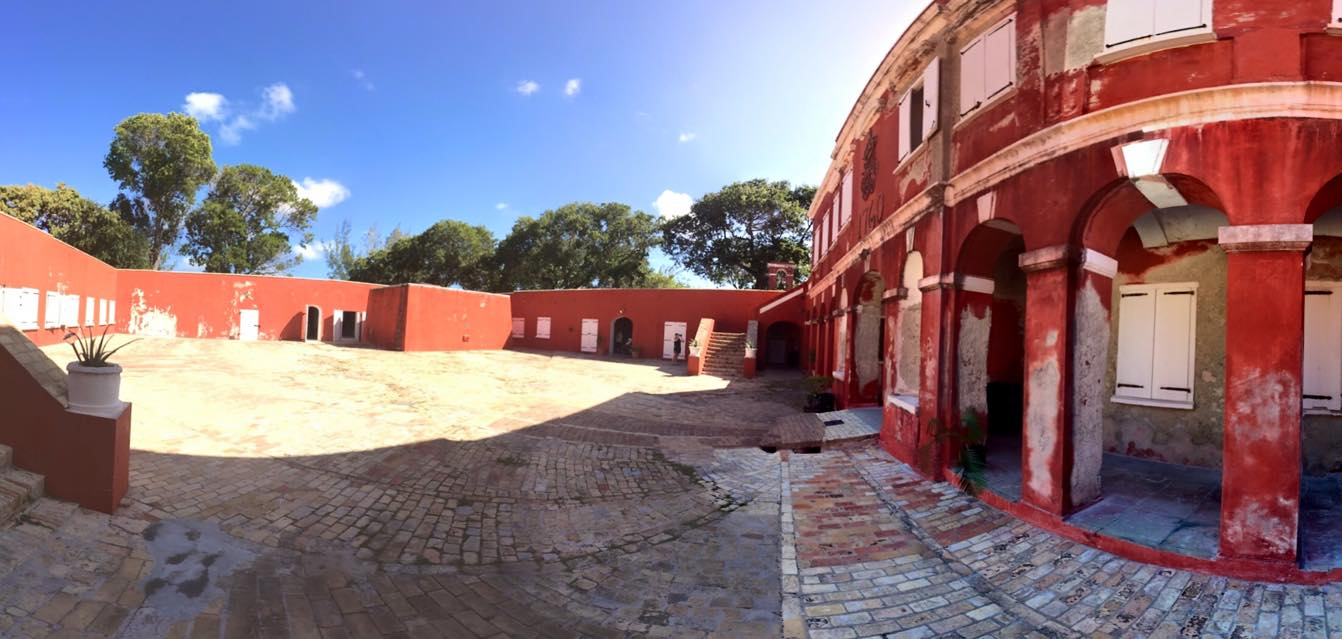
Internal Courtyard Facing South

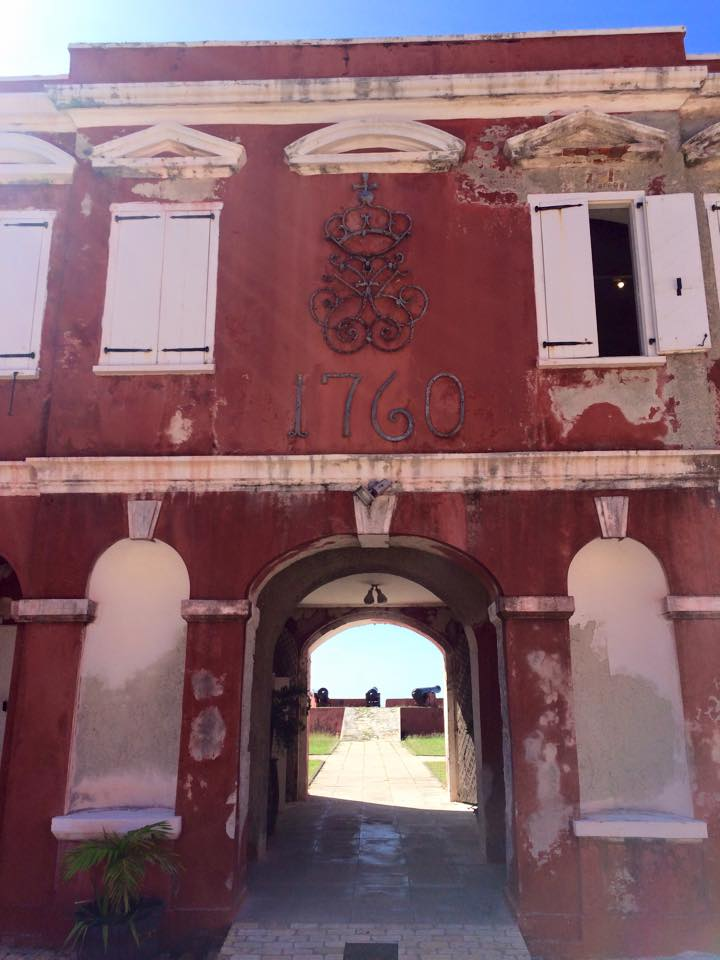
Internal Courtyard Facing West through the Portofino

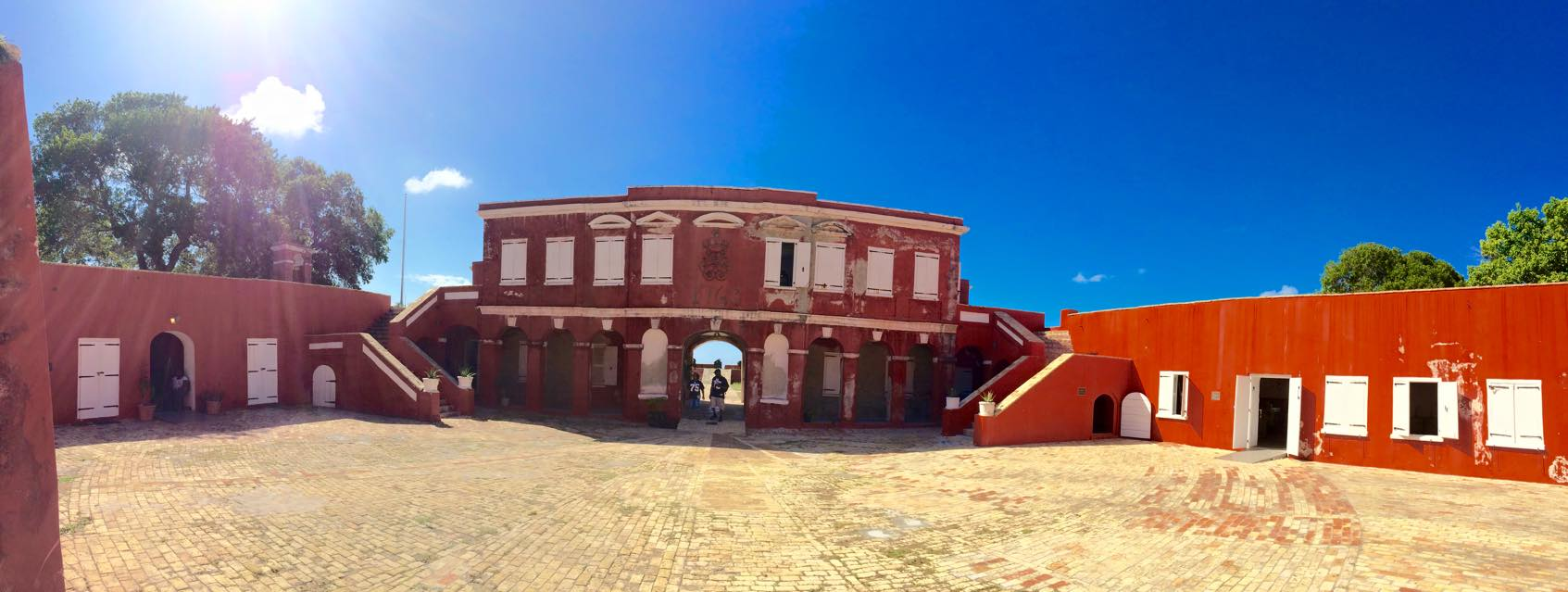
Internal Courtyard Facing West

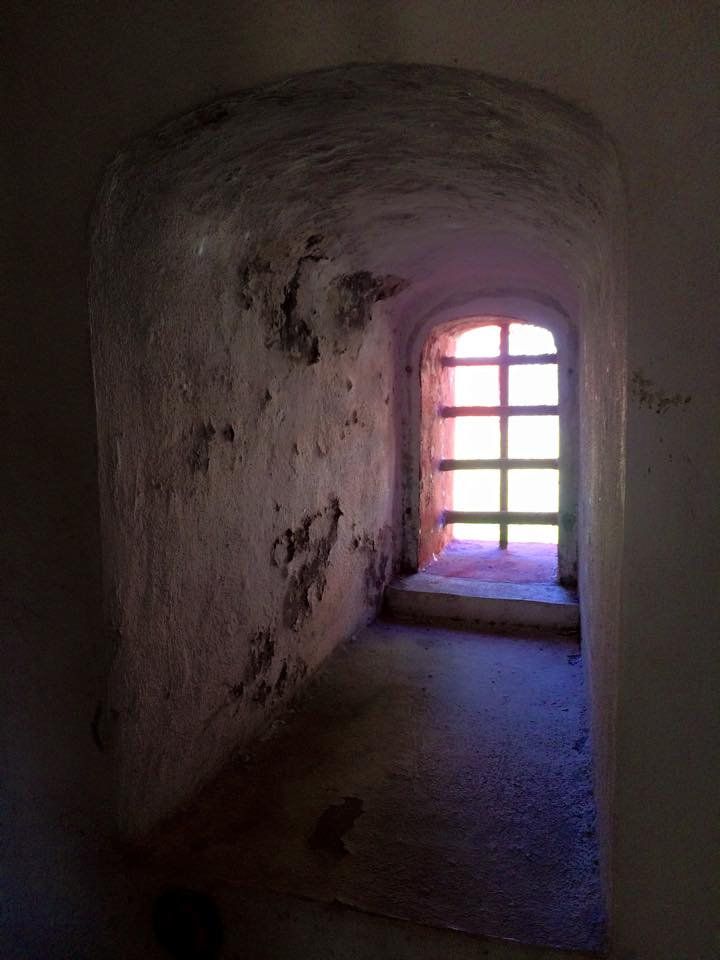
Musket Window

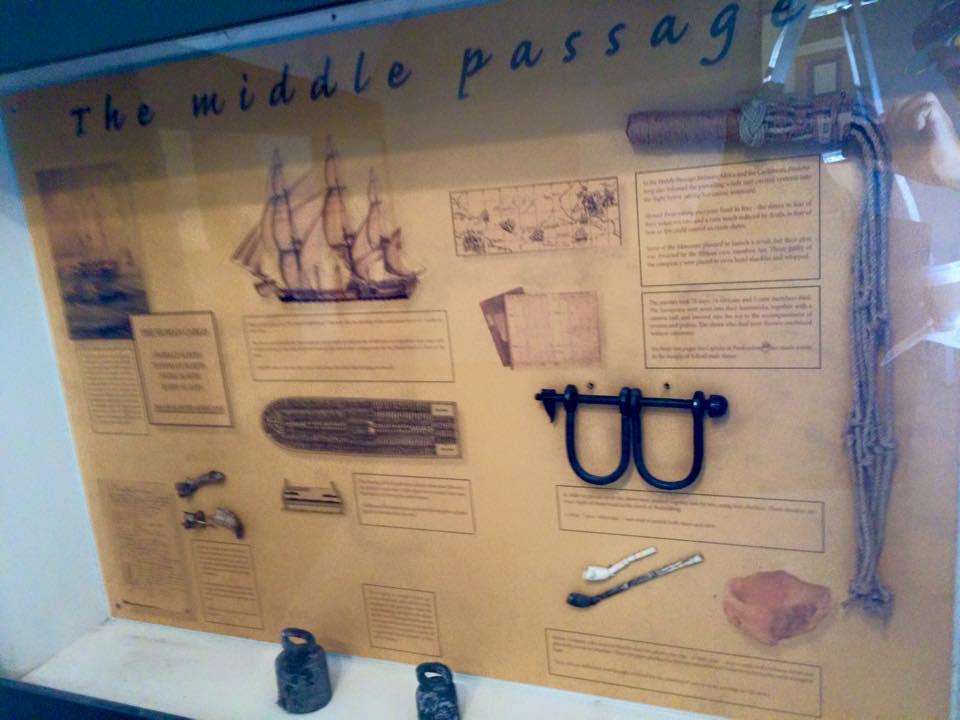
Onsite Museum

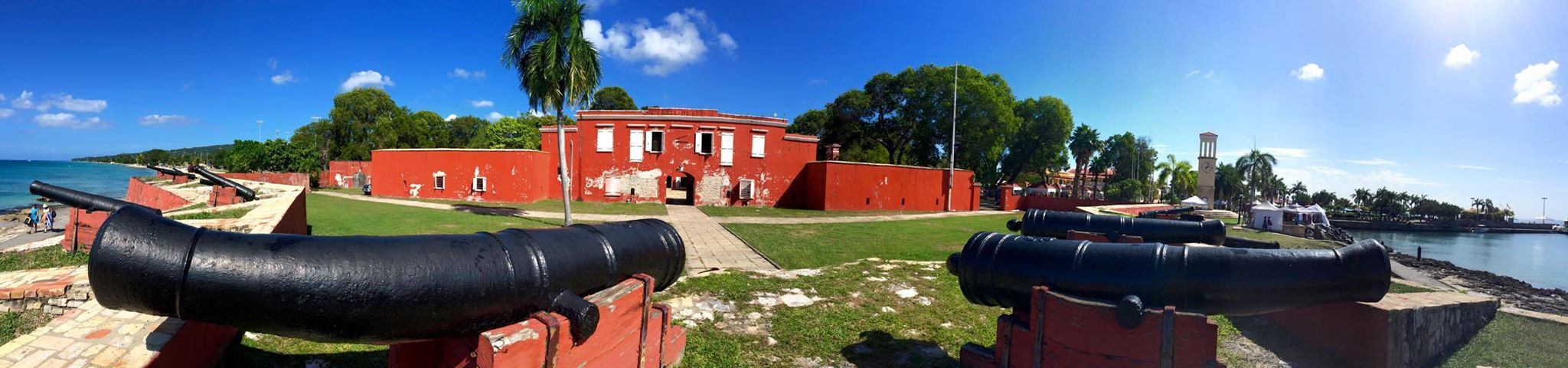
Seawall Facing East with Cannons, Panoramic

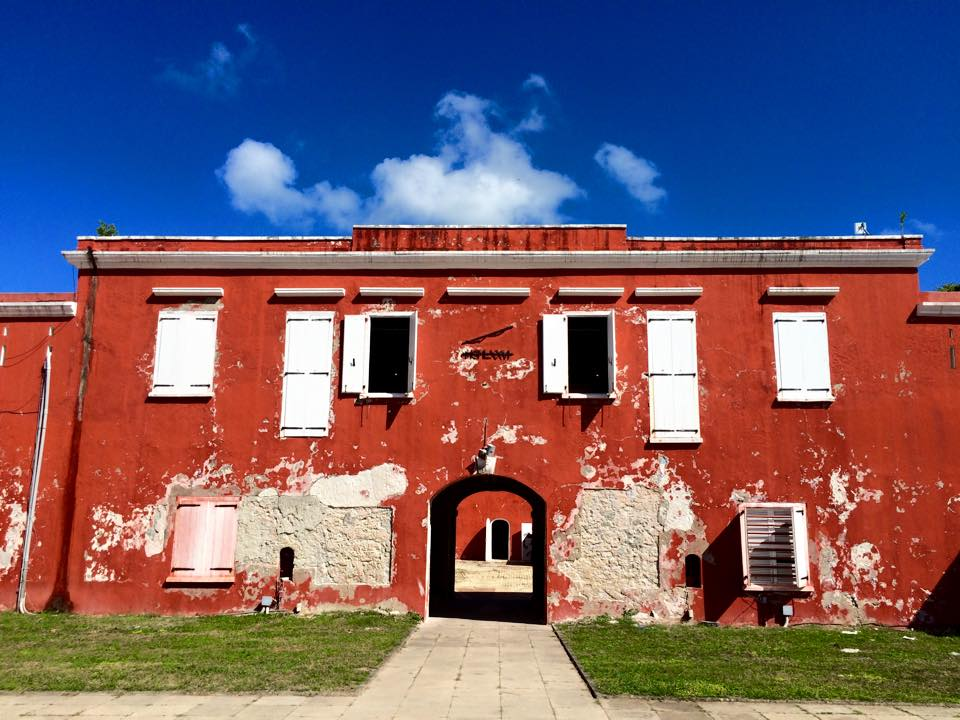
Seawall Facing East

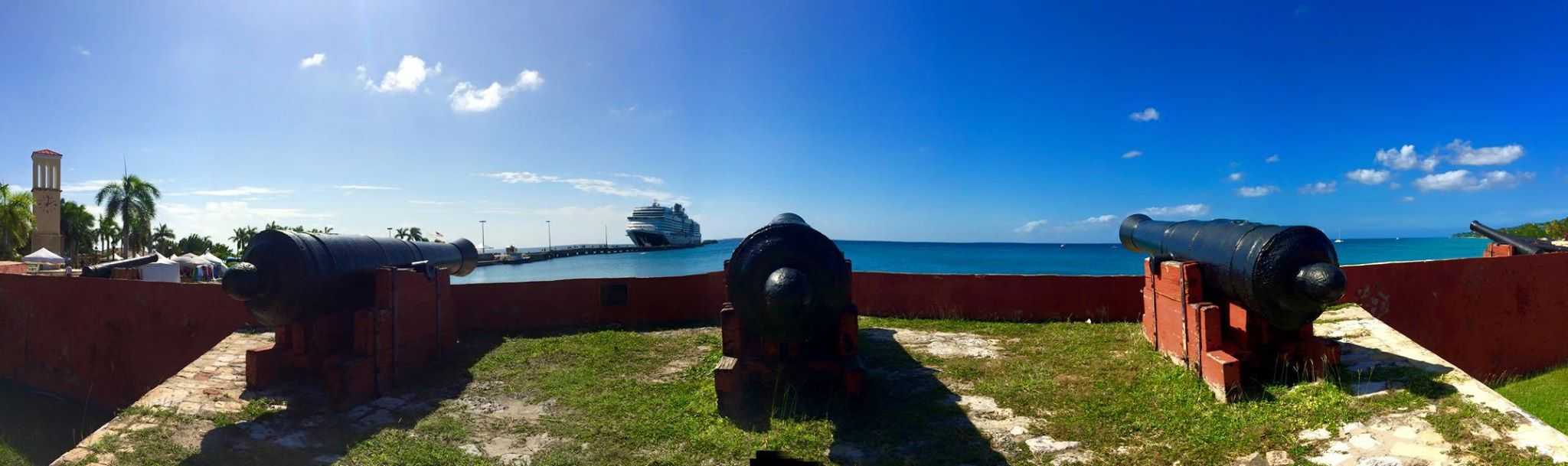
Seawall Facing West with Cannons

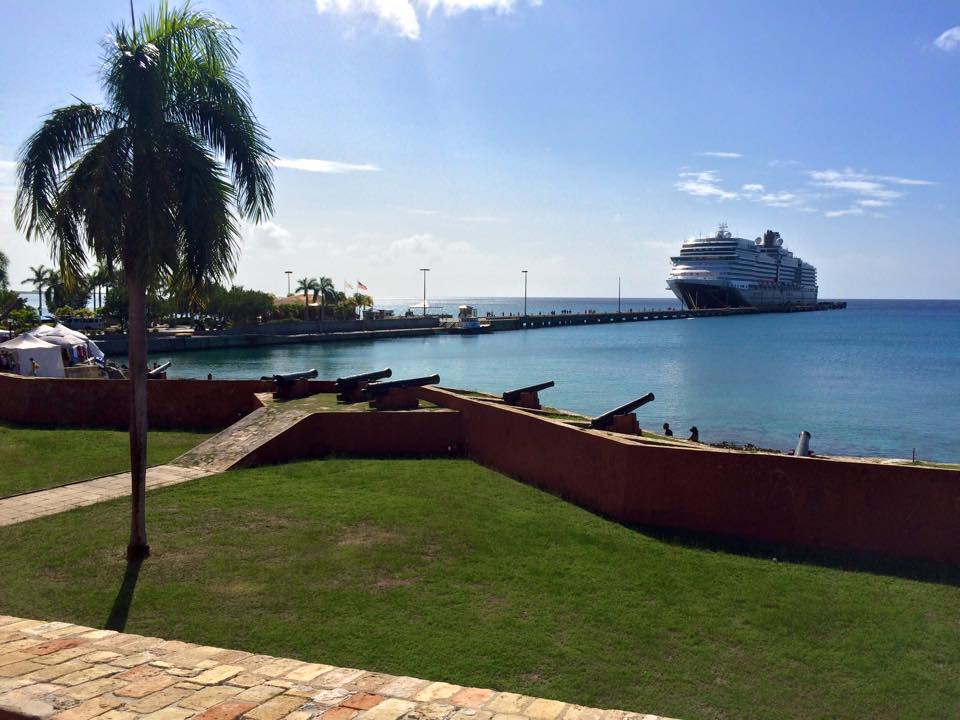
SW View from Seawall with Cannons

== See also ==
- List of United States National Historic Landmarks in United States commonwealths and territories, associated states, and foreign states
- National Register of Historic Places listings in the United States Virgin Islands
