= St. George Village Botanical Garden =

Botanical garden with arboretum in Saint Croix, U.S. Virgin Islands

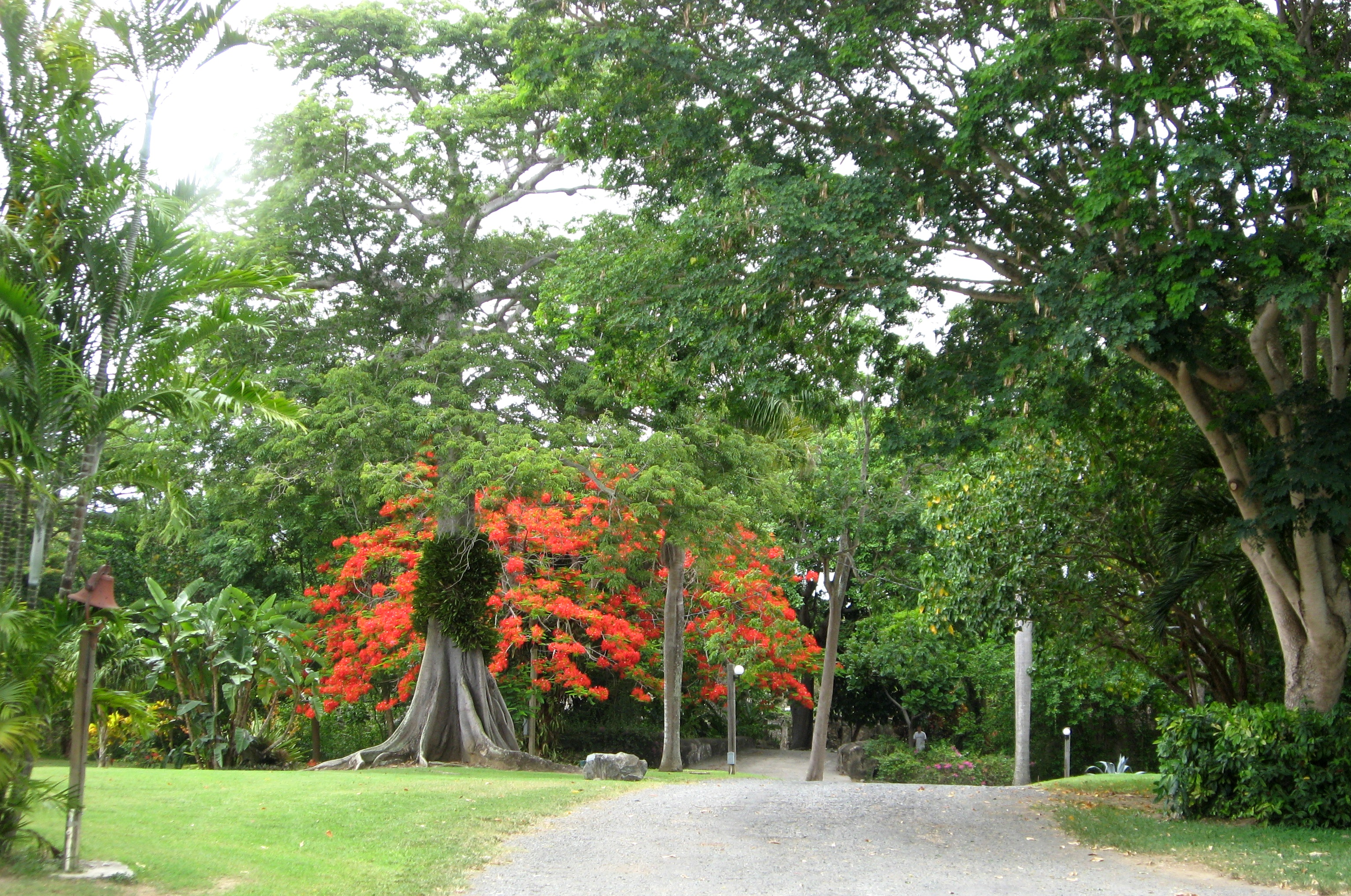
- St. George Village Botanical Garden

- Location within Saint Croix, U.S. Virgin Islands Location within the U.S. Virgin Islands
- Type: Botanical Garden
- Location: 127 Estate St. George, Frederiksted, Saint Croix, U.S. Virgin Islands
- Coordinates: 17.7152°N 64.8307°W
- Area: 16 acres (6.5 ha)
- Website: www.thegardenstcroix.org

The St. George Village Botanical Garden (16 acres) is a botanical garden with arboretum located at 127 Estate St. George, Frederiksted, Saint Croix, U.S. Virgin Islands.

== History ==
The garden is set in and around the restored buildings and ruins of a 19th-century Danish sugarcane plantation. It contains over 1500 native and exotic species and varieties, including bromeliads, cactus and succulents, a conservation garden, a dry palmetum, heritage gardens, orchids, ornamental ferns, native arboretum (about 50 species), naturalized forest, rainforest (irrigated), and sansevieria collection.

It also contains a herbarium (5000 specimens) and a library of 500 volumes, housed in a post-emancipation workers' cottage restored in the early 1980s.

== Collections ==
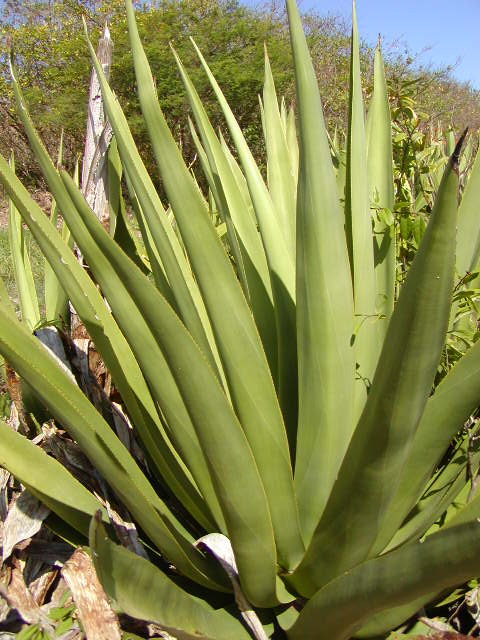
Agave eggersiana endemic and endangered species of St. Croix.

The 16 acres gardens house the most complete collection of plants in the Virgin Islands. The garden mission is to conserve the native plant species of St. Croix, as well as threatened species from other Caribbean islands that adapt to local environmental conditions. In addition, the garden preserves the ethno-botanical history of St. Croix, through living exhibits, graphics, and structural displays. Through its gardens and collections, it is an educational center for a better understanding, not only of the island botanical heritage, but also of the potential horticultural for contemporary gardening in the Virgin Islands.

There are more than 1,500 variety is of plants in the garden, which are grouped in different collections:

- Bromeliads, contains both the epiphytes and the terrestrial species, and is found within the stabilized ruins of the plantation's sugar factory. The collection shows the diversity of this group of plants, from the rosette shapes that trap water and nutrients in their central "cups" or the tillandsias with their elongated leaves containing small hairs, which trap and absorb water of moisture in the air.
- Cactus and Succulents, growing within the ruins of a 19th century sugar factory, contain both native and exotic species, as well as some rare endangered species. It focuses on the species of Cuba and Trinidad and Tobago, with an emphasis on Central America and the Greater Antilles.
- Conservation Garden, is one of the most recent collections of the botanical garden and contains rare and endangered species from the Virgin Islands and Puerto Rico.

The signage and labeling throughout the area represents the need for conservation of these species, as well as the reasons for their possible extinction. "St. George Village" is an affiliate member of the Center for Plant Conservation, the only national organization dedicated exclusively to preventing the extinction of threatened flora in America. The garden reflects this concern in its mission statement, exposing plants to visitors and monitoring their cultivation. Among these species is the Agave eggersiana species endemic from the island of St. Croix.

- Palmetum of dry climates species, because St. Croix is a tropical island in a dry place, the Botanical Garden Palmetum, with more than 65 species, specializes in the cultivation of palms that grow dry in the Caribbean and adjacent regions of Central and South America.
- Jungle Exotic, because St. Croix is a tropical island in a dry place, this area contains plants that are not seen locally in natural associations. The jungle is the only area of the garden that is watered daily. Here we find anthurium, heliconias, bromeliads, gingers, orchids, Araceae, and Hedychium coronarium.
- Heritage Gardens, these natural heritage gardens are collections of plants that have been used historically in the Caribbean to meet basic human needs. Here there are several sections such as; The garden of medicinal herbs; The garden of the dyes; The Garden of the Antilles; Traditional fruit trees in orchards in the West Indies; The garden of spices; Trees of historical importance; The garden of the straw and the weaving; A typical Antillean garden of mixed flowers; The sugar cane garden.
- Native Arboretum, although much of St. Croix is now covered in trees that were introduced and have become naturalized, this area of the garden, containing approximately 50 species, is dedicated to trees that are considered "native" according to the oldest botanical records. Thus Ceiba pentandra, Tecoma stans, Hura crepitans. It contains many examples of trees that have had commercial or economic value and have been harvested to near extinction on the island. The ultimate goal of the Arboretum is to provide propagation material for the reintroduction of these native species into the wild.
- Orchids, the St. George orchid collection includes 60 species and hundreds of orchids hybrids. Visitors can enjoy a year-round display of flowering specimens at the "Marmaduke Orchid House". Also many of them can be found thriving on trees through gardens, including examples of native species.

== See also ==
- List of botanical gardens and arboretums in U.S. Virgin Islands
