= Frederiksted Pier =

Cruise ship pier in Saint Croix, U.S. Virgin Islands

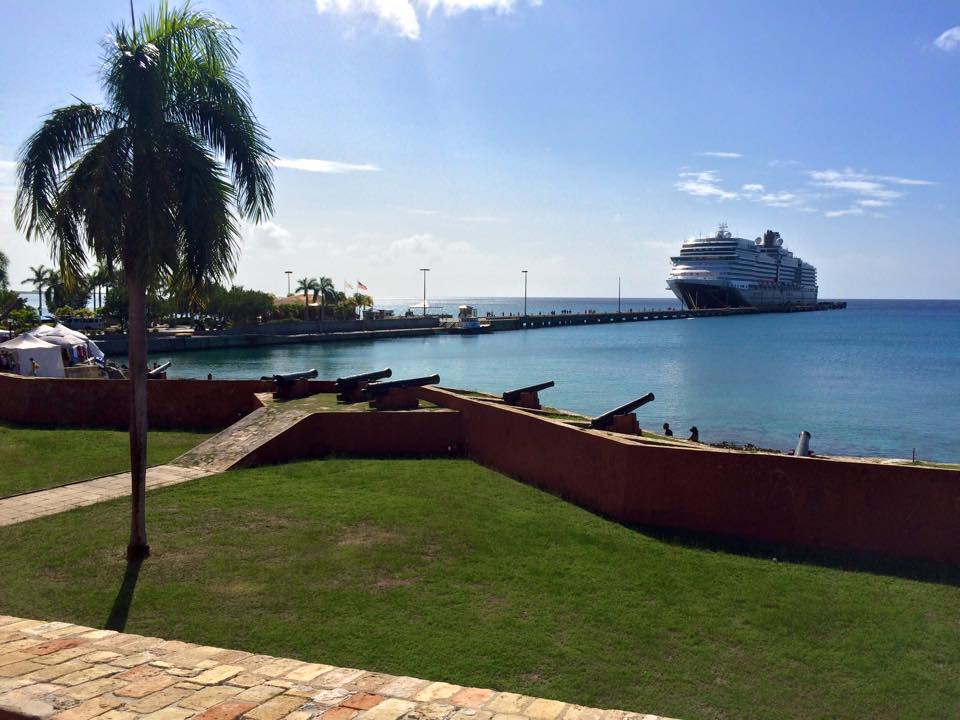
- SW view from Fort Frederiksted's cannons
- Type: Working pier, deep water, cruise ship
- Location: Custom House Street; Frederiksted, U.S. Virgin Islands
- Coordinates: 17.713944°N 64.888349°W
- Official name: Ann E. Abramson Marine Facility

History
- Opening date: July 15, 1994

The Frederiksted Pier (officially named: Ann E. Abramson Marine Facility) is the 1,526-foot (0.465 km or 0.29 mile), deep water, cruise ship pier located in Frederiksted, U.S. Virgin Islands. It is located at the west end of Saint Croix, U.S. Virgin Islands and accommodate two Eagle-class vessels, of a maximum of 142,000 gross tons each with drafts up to 29 feet and two mini-cruise vessels with drafts of 18 feet. Anchorage is also available in the outer harbor for larger ships. The platform of the pier is equipped with a fendering system that is designed for submarines.

A shopping area is located within walking distance to the pier. Additionally, ground transportation, public restrooms and other services are available. While the pier is the gateway to shopping in Frederiksted, taxis and tour buses take visitors to Christiansted for shopping, sightseeing, and on round-the-island tours.

Elevation is 10 feet (3 meters) above sea level at the outermost point, with 3 foot (1 meter) high access platforms for entry onto scuba diving boats and sailing charters.

The original pier was destroyed in 1989 by Hurricane Hugo and again ravaged in 1995 by Hurricane Marilyn. Remains of the old pier are still there with decades of coral growth and sponges. Some of the old pier was used as landfill for the current pier platform, while the vast majority was removed and sunk two miles north in 110 foot deep water at a dive site known as Armageddon.

== Uses, features, special events ==
The pier is a popular destination for scuba diving enthusiasts, snorkeling, sport fishermen, swimming competitions, and internationally recognized stand-up paddleboarding competition the Coconut Cup. There is a large public beach directly off the pier, used by locals and tourists for strolls and scenic views, as well as many restaurants and bars. Scuba on the Frederiksted Pier is a shallow dive, ideal for trying scuba the first time course resort diving, for extended shore diving, night diving, and especially for underwater photography—offering views of creatures such as seahorses, batfish and frogfish at depths of 7 metres. Dive shops in Frederiksted include Ne2une Scuba, St. Croix Ultimate Bluewater Adventures (SCUBA) and Adventures in Diving STX.
