= Henrik Franz Alexander von Eggers =

Danish soldier and botanist

Henrik [Heinrich] Franz Alexander Baron von Eggers (4 December 1844 – 1903), was a Danish professional soldier and botanist.

== Life ==
Eggers was born on 4 December 1844 in Schleswig, the son of chief of police Baron Oluf Friedrich von Eggers, baron (1800 - 1856) and Anna Magdalena Evers (1815-1887). His sister Antoinette Christine Vilhelmine Rosa Louise von Eggers (1837-1906) was married to Anders Sandøe Ørsted (1826-1905), mayor of Vejle and son of the famous physicist Hans Christian Ørsted. After studies at the gymnasium in Odense, Eggers entered the Danish army as subaltern in 1864 and fought in the Danish-German war.

At the end of 1864 he joined the Imperial Mexican Volunteer Corps Österreichisches Freiwilligenkorps in Mexiko and fell into captivity of the Mexican Republicans at the end of the month-long siege of Oaxaca. He was freed in 1867, rejoined the Danish army as lieutenant and had himself posted in the Danish Antilles, where he served until his retirement, as captain, in 1885. In 1873 he married Mathilde Camilla Stakemann. Between 1880 and 1886 Adolph Toepffer edited his plant collections as exsiccata and distributed them under the title Eggers, Flora exsiccata Indiae occidentalis. Edidit: Adolph Toepffer. 1880 et seq.

His retirement from the army marked the beginning of his career as botanist. He studied and published the flora of St. Croix, St. John, St. Thomas, Water Island and Vieques. He made numerous trips and collected extensively on virtually all the islands of the Greater and Lesser Antilles: Dominica in 1880, Puerto Rico in 1881 and 1883, Tortola, St. Kitts, the Dominican Republic and Turks in 1887, Haiti, Jamaica and the Bahamas in 1888–89 and Tobago, Trinidad, Grenada, St. Vincent and Barbados in 1889–90. He moved to Ecuador in 1891 where he stayed until 1897 making numerous collections. He had a hacienda at El Recreo, in the vicinity of San Vicente in Manabí province.

The plant genus Eggersia was named for him by Joseph Dalton Hooker. The species Eggersia buxifolia (Hook.f.) is synonymous with Neea buxifolia (Hook.f.) Heimerl.

== Species named for Eggers ==
- Strumigenys eggersi – Eggers' dacetine ant
- Agave eggersiana – St. Croix century plant
- Erythrina eggersii

== Notes ==
- Baron is a title, not a first or middle name.

== Bibliography ==
- Publications by Baron Eggers on WorldCat
