= Delta Dorsch =

- Born: Delta M. Jackson; March 26, 1915; Frederiksted, St. Croix, Danish West Indies
- Died: January 28, 2011 (aged 95); Christiansted, U.S. Virgin Islands
- Other name: Delta Jackson Dorsch
- Occupations: educator, cultural preservationist
- Years active: 1950–88

Delta Dorsch (March 26, 1915 – January 28, 2011) was an educator, story-teller and preserver of the cultural history of the United States Virgin Islands. Teaching for 38 years, working with the Department of Education and the Commission on the Preservation of Virgin Islands Culture, Dorsch was a tireless advocate for conserving traditions of the Virgin Islands and teaching as a means of giving them life. She contributed two books on the history and traditions of the country and received many awards and honors in recognition of her work.

== Early life ==
Delta M. Jackson was born on March 26, 1915, in Frederiksted, on the island of St. Croix in the Danish West Indies, shortly before the territory became the U.S. Virgin Islands. After earning her high school degree, one of the first generation of women from St. Croix to do so, she obtained a degree in education from Central Michigan University. Continuing with her education, Jackson earned a master's degree from New York University (NYU) in 1951 and immediately enrolled to complete her doctorate at Columbia University in school administration. After finishing her PhD, Jackson furthered her education in Europe, studying education at the University of London and the University of Heidelberg, as part of the NYU Graduate Program.

== Career ==
Returning to the Virgin Islands, Jackson began working as an elementary school teacher in the early 1950s. In 1955, she married Frederick Delos Dorsch, who served as the Superintendent of Schools in the Virgin Islands prior to his death in 1960. Continuing to teach in the Virgin Island school system for thirty-eight years, Dorsch also taught both undergraduate and graduate courses at the University of the Virgin Islands (UVI) at the campus on St. Croix. Between 1977 and 1982, she served the Virgin Islands Department of Education, as deputy commissioner of curriculum and worked as chairman of the board at St. Dunstan's Episcopal School.

Dorsch was dedicated to the preservation of cultural heritage, serving on the Commission on the Preservation of Virgin Islands Culture. She used storytelling to generate a platform for cultural conservation and collected folk tales to keep them alive. In 1983, when the St. Croix Heritage Dancers Organization inaugurated their annual ball, which recognizes two citizens for their contributions to cultural heritage, Dorsch and Vincent Harris were the chosen first honorees. After her retirement in 1988, Dorsch participated in many storytelling events, such as the Senegal Folklife Festival held at the Smithsonian in Washington, D.C., in 1990. She had particular interest in saving stories of Bru Nansi and Jumbie, which are particular to the Virgin Islands and its African past. She wrote a book entitled The Role of the Storyteller in the Preservation of Virgin Islands Culture (1999) and contributed to The Glory Days of Frederiksted (2004).

In 2010, UVI named the campus residence halls in her honor and Frederiksted's Dorsch Beach also bears her name. Dorsch is the eponym of The Elena Christian School's National Honor Society program.

== Death and legacy ==
Dorsch died at the Governor Juan F. Luis Hospital & Medical Center, in Christiansted, United States Virgin Islands, on January 28, 2011. Posthumously, she was honored by a celebration of her 100th birthday in 2015 to recognize the importance of storytellers in preserving the cultural history of the Virgin Islands.
