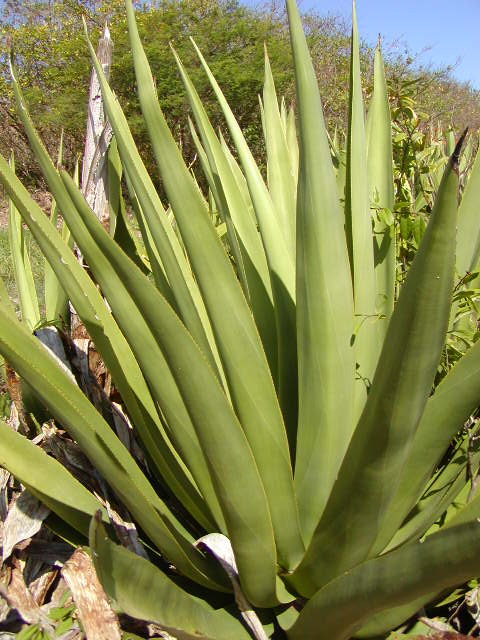

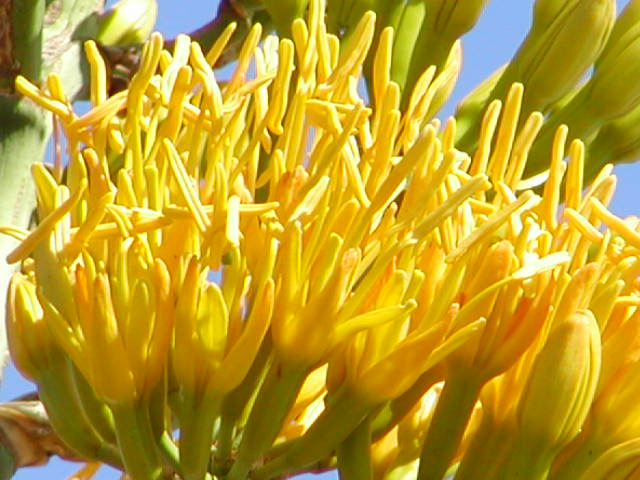

Conservation status
- Endangered (ESA)

- Critically Imperiled (NatureServe)

Scientific classification
- Kingdom: Plantae
- Clade: Tracheophytes
- Clade: Angiosperms
- Clade: Monocots
- Order: Asparagales
- Family: Asparagaceae
- Subfamily: Agavoideae
- Genus: Agave
- Species: A. eggersiana

Binomial name
- Agave eggersiana Trel.

= Agave eggersiana =

Species of flowering plant

Agave eggersiana, or Eggers' century plant, is an endangered species of spiky plant which grows in the Virgin Islands, in dry, exposed areas. Agave eggersiana is a perennial herb known in the wild only from the island of St. Croix of the U.S. Virgin Islands (USFWS 1998a). A small number of plants remain on private land and are threatened by tourist development (USFWS 1998b). Other threats include feral pigs and goats on National Park Service land (USFWS 1998b). Research needs include distribution and abundance, general biology and ecology (USFWS 1998a). The U.S. Fish and Wildlife Service requests that any interested parties (concerned government agencies, the scientific community and/or industry) submit data or suggestions concerning this species (USFWS 1998b). The plant is being cultivated at the St. George Village Botanical Garden in St. Croix U.S.V.I.(USFWS 1998a) and at Fairchild Botanical Gardens in south Florida.

Agave eggersiana has flowering stalks up to 7 m (23 feet) in height and has large, yellow tubular flowers that produce flattened black seeds (USFWS 1998a).
