= Frederiksted, U.S. Virgin Islands =

Place in United States Virgin Islands

Frederiksted
- Town of Frederiksted; By Frederiksted (Danish)
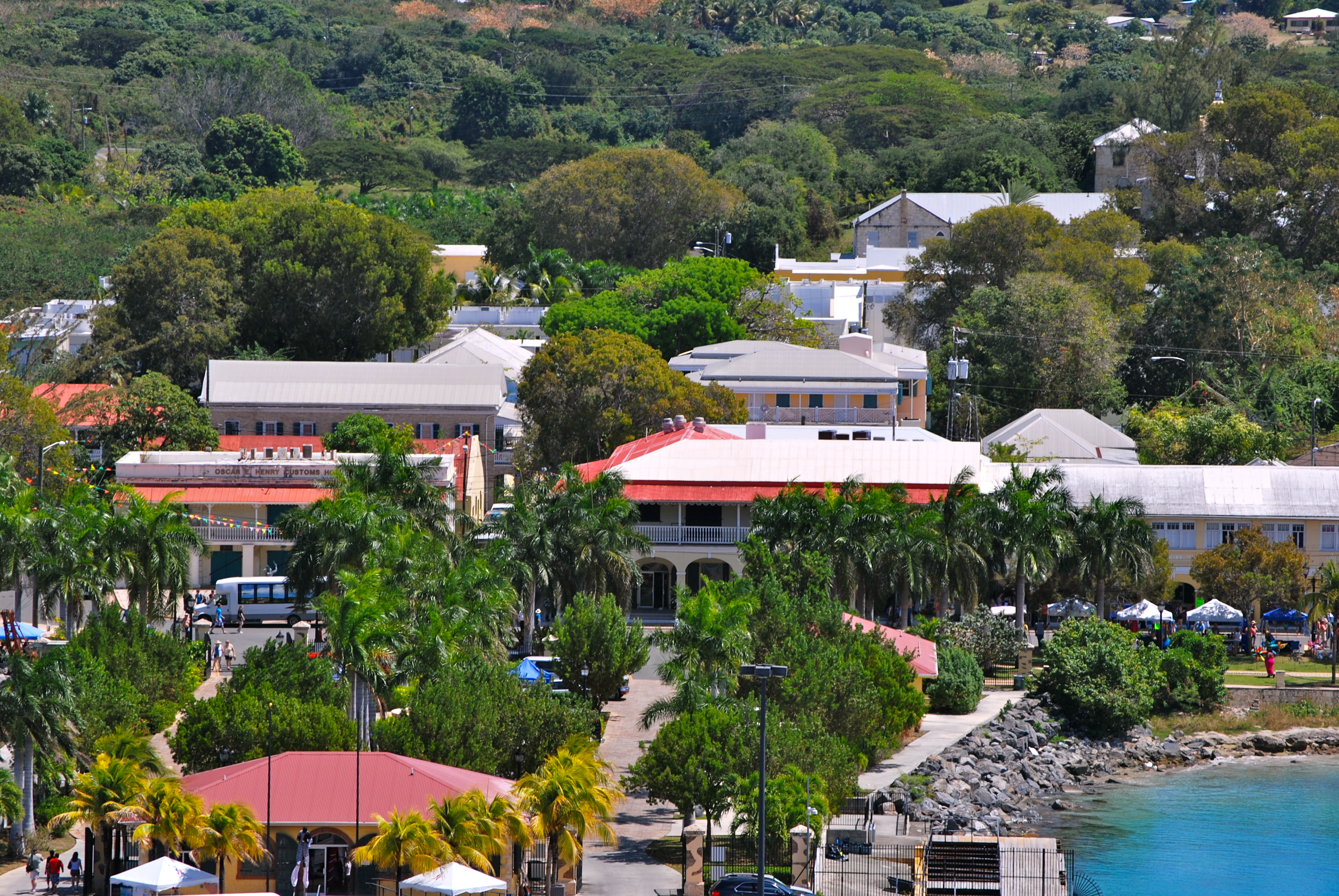
- View from the cruiseship pier into the town
- Nickname: Freedom City
- Location within Saint Croix, U.S. Virgin Islands
- Coordinates: 17°42′42″N 64°52′55″W
- Country: United States
- Territory: U.S. Virgin Islands
- District: Saint Croix
- Named for: Frederik V of Denmark
- ZIP code: 00840, 00841
- Area code: 340

Frederiksted (Danish for "Frederik's Place") is both a town and one of the two administrative districts of St. Croix, U.S. Virgin Islands. It is a grid-planned city, designed by surveyor Jens Beckfor, originally to 14×14 blocks but built 7×7 to enhance the island commerce in the 1700s. Fewer than 1,000 people live in Frederiksted proper, but nearly 10,000 live on the greater western side of the island. Christiansted (mid-island on the north) is about 30 years older, but commerce was limited by its natural, shallow protective reef. Frederiksted was built in the leeward side of the island (shadow of the wind) for calm seas and a naturally deep port. It is home to Fort Frederik, constructed to protect the town from pirate raids and attacks from rival imperialist nations and named after Frederick V of Denmark, who purchased the Danish West Indies in 1754.

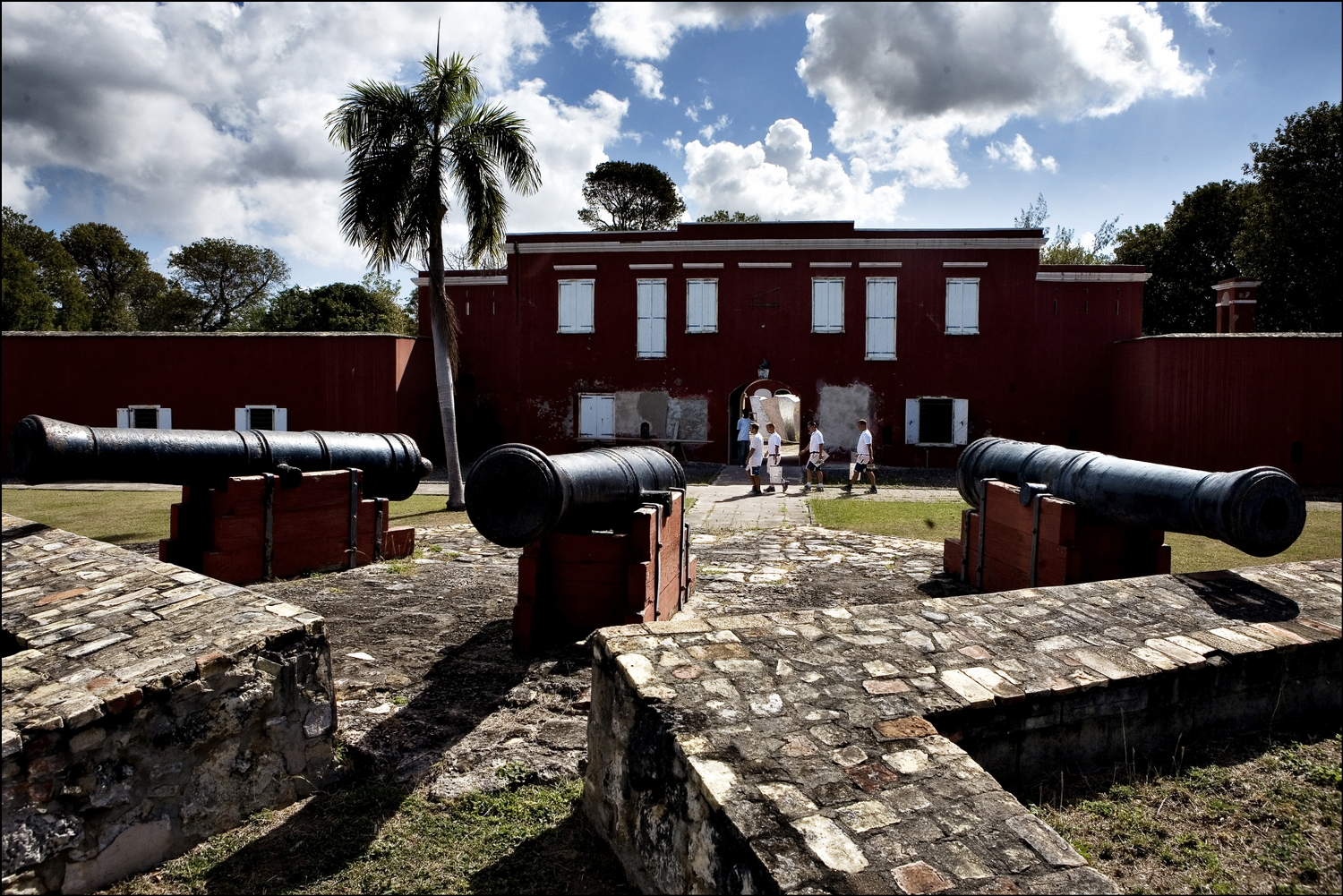
Along Company Street In Downtown Frederiksted

Locals often call Frederiksted "Freedom City". This nickname has to do with the fact that the town was the site of the emancipation of slaves in the then-Danish West Indies. On July 3, 1848, freed slave and skilled craftsman Moses Gottlieb, also known as "General Buddhoe", led the uprising, organized slaves on St. Croix's West End plantations, and marched on Frederiksted. The emancipation of slaves was proclaimed on July 3, 1848, at Fort Frederik on the waterfront at the northern edge of Frederiksted by Governor-General Peter von Scholten.

Frederiksted is home to one of two deep water ports on St. Croix and is the sole port for cruise ships visiting the island. Passengers disembark at the Frederiksted Pier, where they may explore the town, enjoy the beaches, rent a car, or catch a taxi that to other points of interest on St. Croix. The other deep water port is at the South Port and includes the tank farm of the former Hovensa oil refinery and Renaissance Industrial Park. Several government offices occupy historic buildings in the town.

In the early 2000s, Frederiksted was briefly a port for Seaborne Airlines seaplanes, which are based in Christiansted. Seaplane service ended after less than a year when a tropical storm damaged the port facility.

== History ==
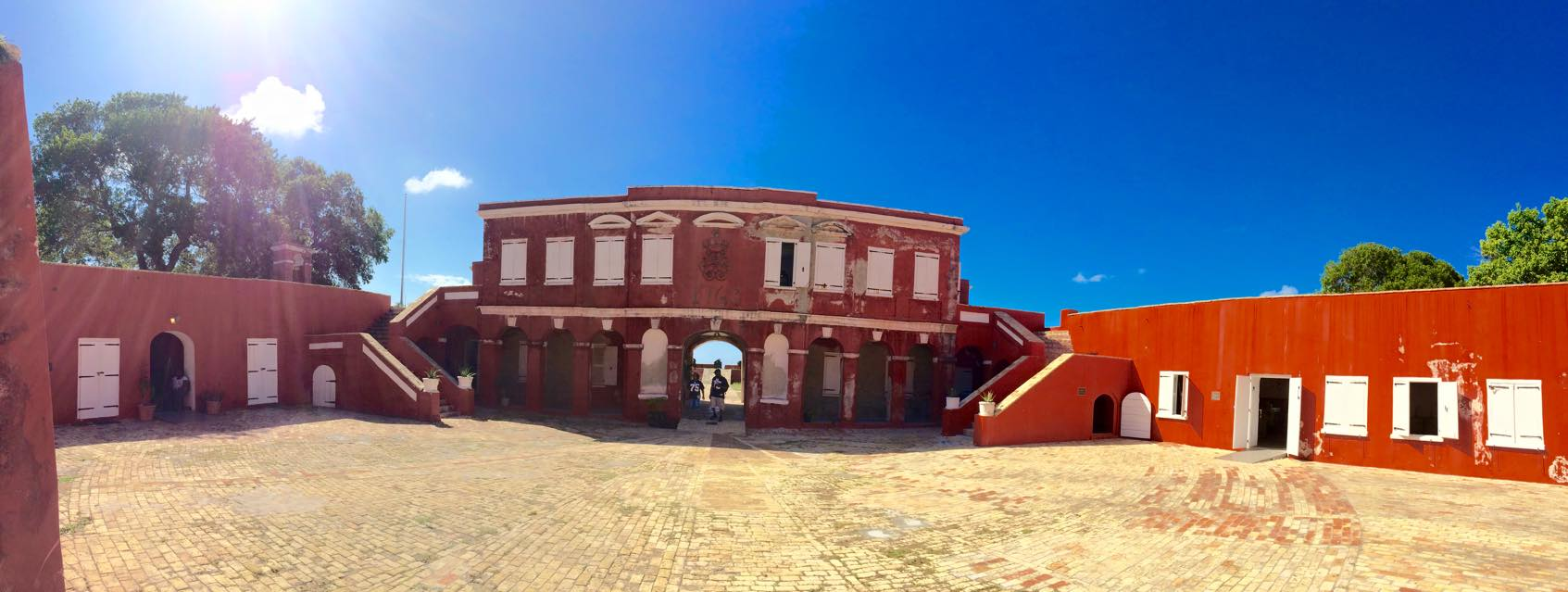
Fort Frederik

The 1867 Virgin Islands earthquake and tsunami heavily damaged the town. The tsunami with an estimated height of 7.6 meters beached the USS Monongahela onshore. At least five people were killed.

The town was destroyed by a labor revolt (known as "The Fireburn" because arson was utilized as a means of revolt) in October 1878, which was led by four Crucian female laborers. Frederiksted was restored during the Victorian era, as reflected in its architecture.

Modern Frederiksted operates at a slower pace than Christiansted, except for carnival in January and whenever cruise ships dock in its deepwater port. In recent years successful redevelopment efforts have begun to restore and revitalize this National Historic Site. The 2000 census population of the town was 732, and that of the larger sub-district was 3,767.

A costumed carnival dancer.

Parade of costumed carnival dancers.

A costumed carnival dancer.

A costumed carnival dancer.

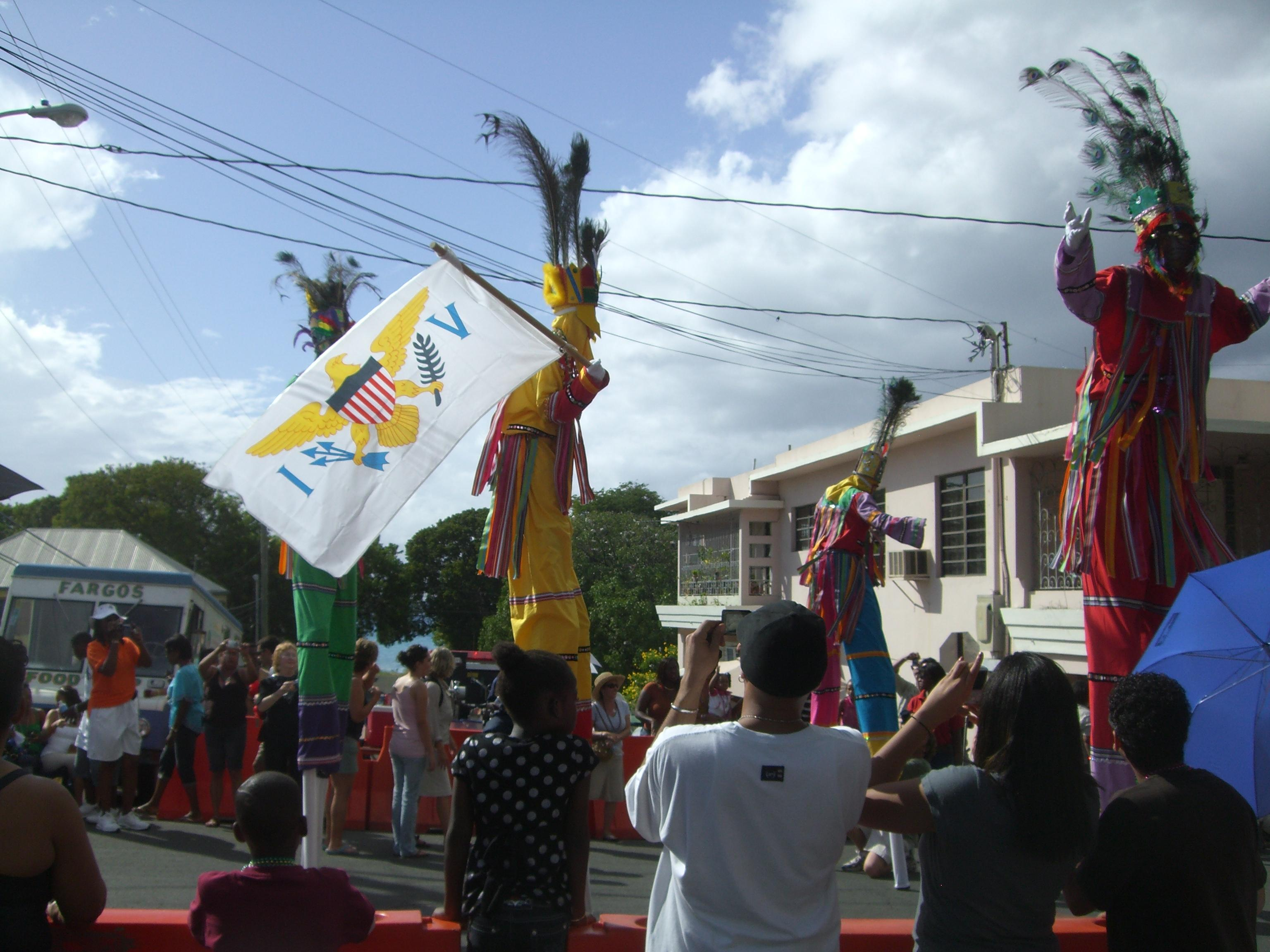
A Moko jumbie.

== Demographics ==
=== 2020 Census ===
Frederiksted town, U.S. Virgin Islands – Racial and ethnic composition Note: the US Census treats Hispanic/Latino as an ethnic category. This table excludes Latinos from the racial categories and assigns them to a separate category. Hispanics/Latinos may be of any race.
Race / Ethnicity (NH = Non-Hispanic)	Pop 2020	% 2020
White alone (NH)	30	5.68%
Black or African American alone (NH)	320	60.61%
Native American or Alaska Native alone (NH)	2	0.38%
Asian alone (NH)	0	0.00%
Native Hawaiian or Pacific Islander alone (NH)	0	0.00%
Other race alone (NH)	3	0.57%
Mixed race or Multiracial (NH)	9	1.70%
Hispanic or Latino (any race)	164	31.06%
Total	528	100.00%

== In media ==
=== Movies ===
- 1994 The Shawshank Redemption
- 1986 Dreams of Gold: The Mel Fisher Story
- 1983 Trading Places
- 1977 The Island of Dr. Moreau (1977 film)

=== Music ===
- 2014 Pressure (reggae musician) music video shot in Frederiksted

== Renovation and revitalization ==
Several companies have drafted plans to refurbish and enhance the greater Frederiksted area. The Public Finance Authority retained Coastal Systems to develop concepts for a waterfront park, beach, cruise pier, and other site improvements. Teams of land planners, engineers, and landscape architects met with local interest groups to develop plans for redevelopment of the area. Environmental regulatory surveys and permits were managed by the Coastal Zone Management (CZM) Agency of the USVI. Phase I of the project was completed, which consisted of the reconstruction of the waterfront park while maintaining the historical facade representative of St. Croix's heritage. Natural stonework was used throughout the project site in accordance with the local architectural style.

Phase II of the project will involve reconstruction of the community waterfront north of the fort and re-creation of breakwaters, reconstruction of Paul E. Joseph Stadium, and restoration of the beach, restroom facilities, retaining pond, utilities, parking areas, and soccer fields.

== Volunteers, community, and art ==
Volunteerism is a big part of Frederiksted. Clean Sweep Frederiksted engages volunteers in community cleanups, mural and garden projects, and other opportunities. It also worked with the Artists Guild of St. Croix to install dozens of painted rum barrels as community trash bins. The Artists Guild of St. Croix has installed several murals and paintings, and sponsors scholarships. Delta Dorsch, who was born in Frederiksted, wrote The Role of the Storyteller in the Preservation of Virgin Islands Culture (1999) and contributed to The Glory Days of Frederiksted (2004) about Frederiksted's culture.

== Climate ==
Frederiksted has a tropical savanna climate (Köppen Aw) featuring very warm to hot weather year-round.

Water temperatures are usually around 78 to 79 °F (25.6 to 26.1 °C) in winter and 85 °F (29.4 °C) in September. The waters are typically very calm, as Frederiksted is in the leeward side (shadow of the island's wind) with about a 12 inches or 0.30 metres tide.

The sunrise varies from 5:30 a.m. in summer to 7:00 a.m. in winter. Sunset varies between 5:40 p.m. in winter to 7:10 p.m. in summer. St. Croix does not use Daylight Saving Time. The ultraviolet index varies from 10+ in the summer and a maximum of 7 in winter.

Persistent 19-knot (35 km/h; 22 mph) easterly trade winds, moving from east to west across the island year round create a cool breeze.

Rainforests occur on the western side of St. Croix due to the topography featuring 1,400 foot or 400 metres peaks, which gather moisture from the trade winds. This rainforest climate is unique to the Frederiksted side of St. Croix.

Climate data for Frederiksted, United States Virgin Islands
Month	Jan	Feb	Mar	Apr	May	Jun	Jul	Aug	Sep	Oct	Nov	Dec	Year
Mean daily maximum °F (°C)	82 (28)	82 (28)	84 (29)	84 (29)	86 (30)	87 (31)	87 (31)	87 (31)	87 (31)	87 (31)	86 (30)	84 (29)	85 (30)
Mean daily minimum °F (°C)	69 (21)	69 (21)	69 (21)	71 (22)	73 (23)	75 (24)	75 (24)	75 (24)	75 (24)	73 (23)	71 (22)	71 (22)	72 (23)
Average rainfall inches (mm)	2.2 (56)	1.9 (48)	1.6 (41)	2.6 (66)	4.0 (100)	2.7 (69)	3.3 (84)	4.3 (110)	5.6 (140)	5.4 (140)	4.5 (110)	3.6 (91)	41.7 (1,060)
Source: Weatherbase

Hurricanes:

- 1984 Nov. Category 1 Hurricane Klaus (1984) caused severe flooding
- 1989, Sept. Category 4 Hugo devastated ~85% of St. Croix, destroying the Old Frederiksted Pier
- 1995, Sept. Category 2 Marilyn caused severe damage to St. Croix, in particular to the Frederiksted side of the island and even more damage to St. Thomas.
- 1998, Sept. Category 4 Hurricane Georges affected 15% of the island's power grid, wind and wave damage.
- 1999, Oct. Category 2 Hurricane Jose (1999) minimal damage
- 1999, Nov. Category 4 Hurricane Lenny passes 21 miles south of St. Croix, 15-20' waves destroyed many beaches dumping 6.5 ft (2 m) of sand onto coastal roads about 100 ft (30 m) inland, wind damage, and flooding/erosion.
- 2004, Sept. Category 3 Hurricane Jeanne
- 2008, Oct. Category 1 Hurricane Omar (2008) Nearly the entire island lost power, scores of boats were damaged or destroyed, and an oil spill.
- 2010, Aug/Sept. Category 4 Hurricane Earl (2010) minimal damage, power outages
- 2011, Aug. Tropical Storm Hurricane Irene hit St. Croix, damaging beaches
- 2014, Aug. Category 1 Hurricane Bertha (2014) hit St. Croix as a tropical storm, damaging beaches
- 2017, Sept. Category 5 Hurricane Irma passed ~100 miles north of St. Croix with local winds near 100 mph removing small branches and leaves.
- 2017, Sept. Category 5 Hurricane Maria passed ~10 miles south of St. Croix.

== Notable people ==
- Joe Christopher, former Major League Baseball player for the Pittsburgh Pirates and New York Mets
- Victor Cornelins, Danish school teacher, musician, and public speaker.

== See also ==
- Christiansted
- Saint Croix
- List of settlements in the United States Virgin Islands
- Cruzan Rum
- Danish West Indies
- Fireburn
- St. George Village Botanical Garden
- Frederiksted Historic District
