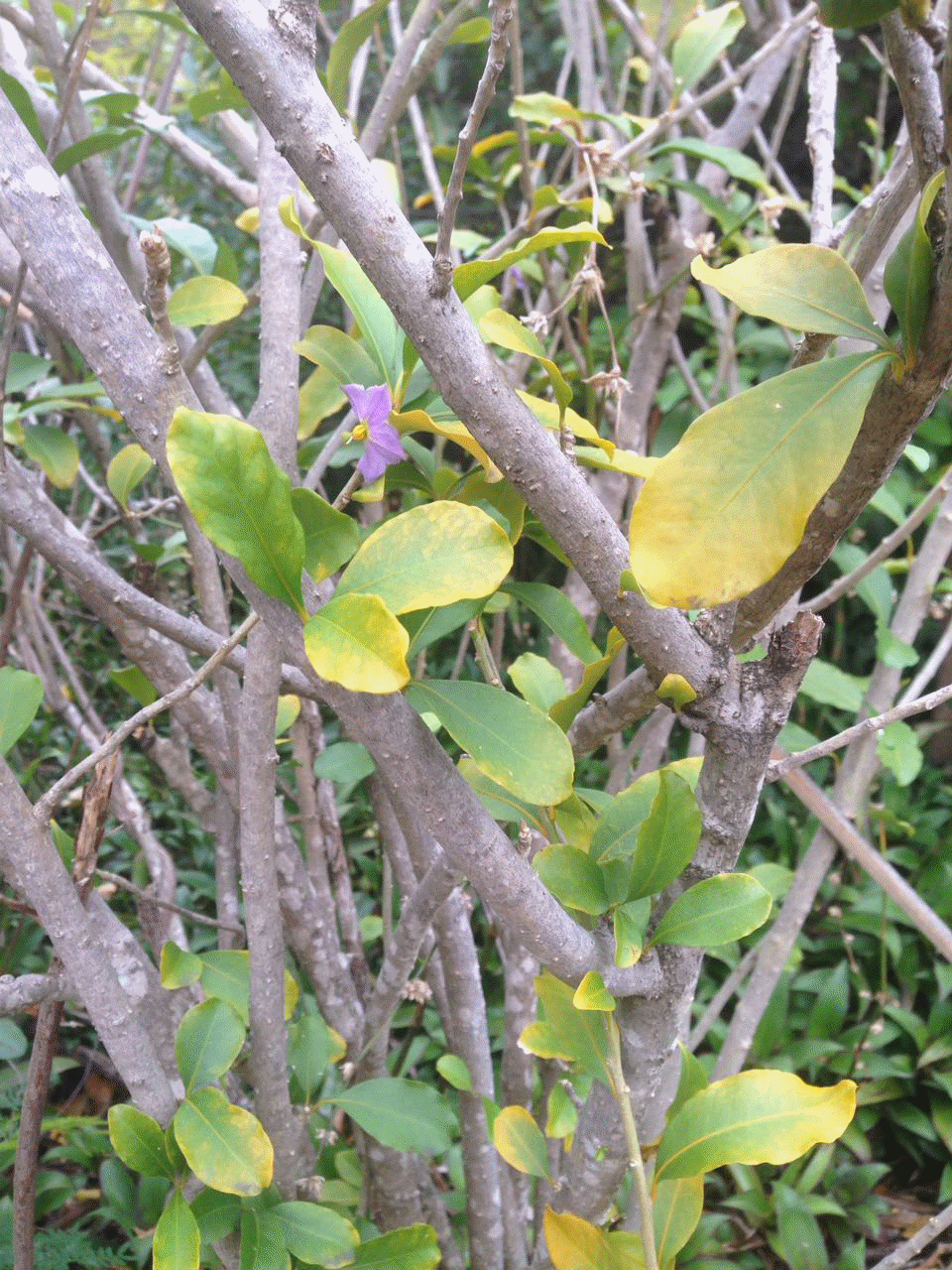

Scientific classification
- Kingdom: Plantae
- Clade: Tracheophytes
- Clade: Angiosperms
- Clade: Eudicots
- Clade: Asterids
- Order: Solanales
- Family: Solanaceae
- Genus: Solanum
- Species: S. conocarpum

Binomial name
- Solanum conocarpum Dunal

= Solanum conocarpum =

Species of vascular plant

Solanum conocarpum, commonly known as marron bacoba, is a vascular plant species in the family Solanaceae found in the US Virgin Islands and British Virgin Islands.

== Description ==
Solanum conocarpum is a thornless and flowering plant. It is a perennial shrub that is endemic to the Virgin Islands. For some time, the species was considered endemic to U.S. Virgin Islands Dry Forest on the island of St. John. However, recent work in 2018 discovered a small population on neighboring Tortola, in the British Virgin Islands. Despite this range extension, the species has a low number of reproductive adults and low recruitment: it remains listed as Endangered by the IUCN Red List.

Solanum conocarpum can reach up to nine feet high and is found in dry, deciduous forests. This shrub grows up to about 3 meters with a grey-colored bark, elliptical shaped leaves about 2 cm long and with an orange midrib, and lavender-colored flowers. Individuals are dioecious, each only having flowers of one sex. Flowering is typically induced by rain events.
